= List of modern words formed from Greek polis =

This List of modern words formed from Greek polis recounts the use of the ancient Greek word polis to form modern names. The greatest modern use is in place names.

== Derived common nouns ==
Derivatives of polis are common in many modern European languages. This is indicative of the influence of the polis-centred Hellenic world view. Derivative words in English include policy, polity, police, and politics. In Greek, words deriving from polis include politēs and politismos, whose exact equivalents in Latin, Romance, and other European languages, respectively civis ("citizen"), civilisatio ("civilisation"), etc., are similarly derived.

A number of other common nouns end in -polis. Most refer to a special kind of city or state. Examples include:

- Acropolis ("high city"), Athens, Greece – although not a city-polis by itself, but a fortified citadel that consisted of functional buildings and the Temple in honor of the city-sponsoring god or goddess. The Athenian acropolis was the most famous of all acropolises in the ancient Greek World and its main temple was the Parthenon, in honor of Athena Parthenos (Athena the Virgin). More generally, Acropolis has been used to describe the upper part of a polis, often a citadel or the site of major temples.
- Astropolis – a star-scaled city/industry area; a complex space station; a European star-related festival
- Cosmopolis – a large urban centre with a population of many different cultural backgrounds; a novel written by Don DeLillo
- Ecumenopolis – a city that covers an entire planet, usually seen in science fiction
- Megalopolis – created by the merging of several cities and their suburbs
- Metropolis – the mother city of a colony; the see of a metropolitan archbishop; a metropolitan area (major urban population centre)
- Necropolis ("city of the dead") – a graveyard
- Technopolis – a city with high-tech industry; a room of computers; the Internet

== City names ==
=== City names with numbers ===
Others refer to part of a city or a group of cities, such as:

1. Polis, or Polis Chrysochous (Greek: Πόλις Χρυσοχούς), located on the northwest coast of Cyprus within the Paphos District and on the edge of the Akamas peninsula. During the Cypro-Classical period, Polis became one of the most important ancient Cypriot city-kingdoms on the island, with important commercial relations with the eastern Aegean Islands, Attica, and Corinth. The town is also well known due to its mythological history, including the site of the Baths of Aphrodite.

3. Tripolis – a group of three cities, retained in the names of Tripoli, Libya; Tripoli, Greece; and Tripoli, Lebanon

4. Tetrapolis – a group of four cities

5. Pentapolis – a group of five cities

6. Hexapolis – a group of six cities

7. Heptapolis, Middle Egypt – a group of seven cities

8. Octapolis, in ancient Caria or Lycia – a group of eight cities

10. Decapolis, a group of ten cities in the Levant

12. Dodecapolis – a group of twelve cities

=== Descriptive city names ===
The names of several other towns and cities in Europe and the Middle East have contained the suffix -polis since antiquity or currently feature modernized spellings, such as -pol. Notable examples include:

- Adrianopolis or Adrianople ("Hadrian's city"), present-day Edirne, Turkey
- Alexandropol ("Alexandra's city"), currently Gyumri, Armenia
- Alexandroupolis ("Alexander's city"), Greece
- Antipolis ("the city across"), the former name for Antibes, France
- Constantinopolis or Constantinople ("Constantine's city"), capital of Byzantine Empire.
- Gallipoli ('beautiful city')
- Heliopolis ('Sun city') in ancient and modern Egypt, Lebanon, and Greece
- Heracleopolis ("Hercules' city"), Egypt
- Hermopolis ("Hermes' city"), several cities in Egypt and on Siros Island
- Hierakonpolis ("Hawk city"), Egypt
- Hieropolis ("Sacred city"), several cities in the Hellenistic world, in particular Hierapolis in southwestern Turkey
- Istanbul (derived from the Greek phrase "εἰς τὴν Πόλιν" meaning "to the city"), Turkey.
- Istropolis, currently Bratislava, Slovakia.
- Lithopolis ("Stone city"), Latin name for Kamnik, Slovenia
- Mariupol ("Marios' City"), Ukraine (Greek: Μαριούπολης, Marioupolis)
- Megalopolis ("Great city"), Greece
- Neapolis ("New city"), several, including the modern cities of Nablus and Naples (Italian: Napoli), and the adjective Neapolitan
- Nicopolis ("Victory city"), Emmaus in Israel
- Persepolis ("city of the Persians"), Iran
- Philippopolis ("Philip's city"), the former name for Plovdiv, Bulgaria.
- Seuthopolis ("Seuthes' city"), Bulgaria
- Sevastopol ("Venerable city"), Crimea, Ukraine
- Simferopol ("city of common good"), Crimea, Ukraine
- Sozopol ("Salvaged city"), Bulgaria
- Stavropol ("city of the cross"), Russia
- Tiraspol ("Tiras' city"), Moldova

=== Cities with the -polis suffix ===
The names of other cities were also given the suffix -polis after antiquity, either referring to ancient names or unrelated:

- Anápolis, Goiás, Brazil
- Annapolis, Maryland, United States
- Augustinópolis, Tocantins, Brazil
- Biopolis, Singapore
- Borrazópolis, Paraná, Brazil
- Cambysopolis, Turkey
- Cassopolis, Michigan, United States
- Christianopel, Sweden
- Copperopolis, California, United States
- Coraopolis, Pennsylvania, United States
- Demopolis, Alabama, United States
- Dianópolis, Tocantins, Brazil
- Divinópolis, Minas Gerais, Brazil
- Eunápolis, Bahia, Brazil
- Florianópolis ("Floriano's city"), Santa Catarina, Brazil
- Gallipolis, Ohio, United States
- Indianapolis, Indiana, United States
- Kannapolis, North Carolina, United States
- Lithopolis, Ohio, United States
- Marijampolė, Lithuania
- Metropolis, Illinois, United States
- Minneapolis, Minnesota, United States
- Opolis, Kansas, United States
- Penápolis, São Paulo, Brazil
- Petrópolis ("Pedro's city"), Rio de Janeiro, Brazil
- Piopolis, Quebec, Canada
- Pirenópolis, Goiás, Brazil
- Prudentópolis, Paraná, Brazil
- Quirinópolis, Goiás, Brazil
- Rondonópolis, Mato Grosso, Brazil
- Rorainópolis, Roraima, Brazil
- Salinópolis, Pará, Brazil
- Sebastopol, California, United States
- Sophia-Antipolis, France
- Teresópolis ("Teresa's city"), Rio de Janeiro, Brazil
- Teutopolis, Illinois, United States
- Thermopolis, Wyoming, United States
- Uniopolis, Ohio, United States

== Other uses ==
- Mu Sagittarii Aa, a blue supergiant star in the constellation of Sagittarius. It is formally named Polis.
