= Superman Day =

Annual event in America

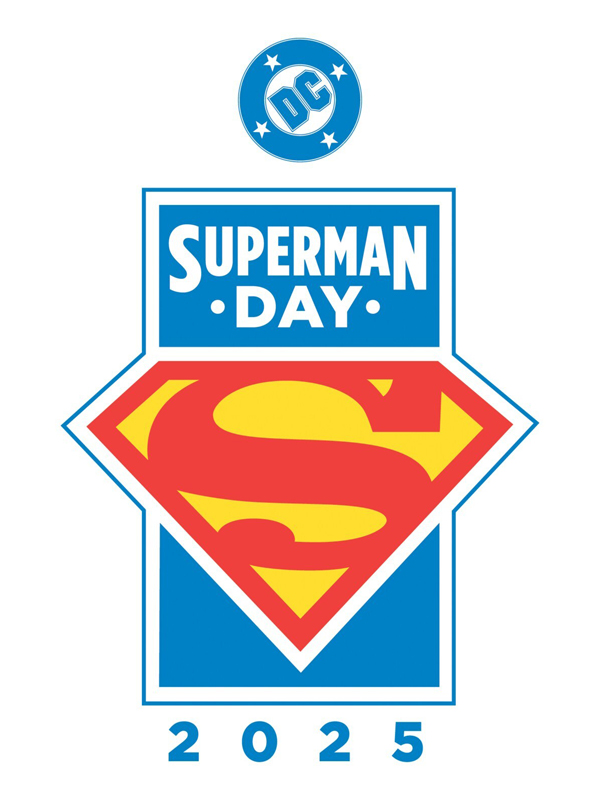
- Observed by: Superman fans
- Type: Secular
- Significance: Celebrating Superman
- Frequency: Annual
- First time: 2013

Superman Day is an annual event organized by DC Entertainment to celebrate and promote Superman.

The first Superman Day was June 12, 2013. It was a date selected by DC Comics and Warner Brothers to celebrate Superman's 75th Anniversary. The day was chosen to coincide with the release date of Man of Steel. Subsequent Superman Days continued to be celebrated on the same day until 2025, when it was celebrated on the actual Superman anniversary, April 18, the day when the first issue of Action Comics, by Jerry Siegel and Joe Shuster was released in 1938. Warner Bros. celebrated the date by releasing several new comics and hosting a special screening of Richard Donner's Superman: The Movie in the Warner Bros. Studio Lot.

Because of the celebration of Superman Day in 2013, in the next year DC and Warner began to celebrate Batman Day in September.

== Annual events ==
List of Superman Days
Year	Date	Special Event
2013	June 12	Man of Steel film release
2014	June 12	Superman Day tradition continued in 2014 and beyond.
2015	June 12	Superman Day 2015 celebrated by comics fandom.
2016	June 12	
2017	June 12	Superman Celebration, in Metropolis, Illinois, coincides with Official Superman Day
2018	June 12	
2019	June 12	
2020	June 12	Superman Day 2020 was celebrated around world with events and promotions by WB and DC.
2021	June 12	
2022	June 12	Superman Homepage celebrates Superman day 2022.
2023	June 12	
2024	June 12	James Gunn celebrates Superman Day.
2025	April 18	Superman Day 2025 at WB Studios
2026	April 18	
