= Metropolis Bridge =

Bridge in Illinois and Kentucky

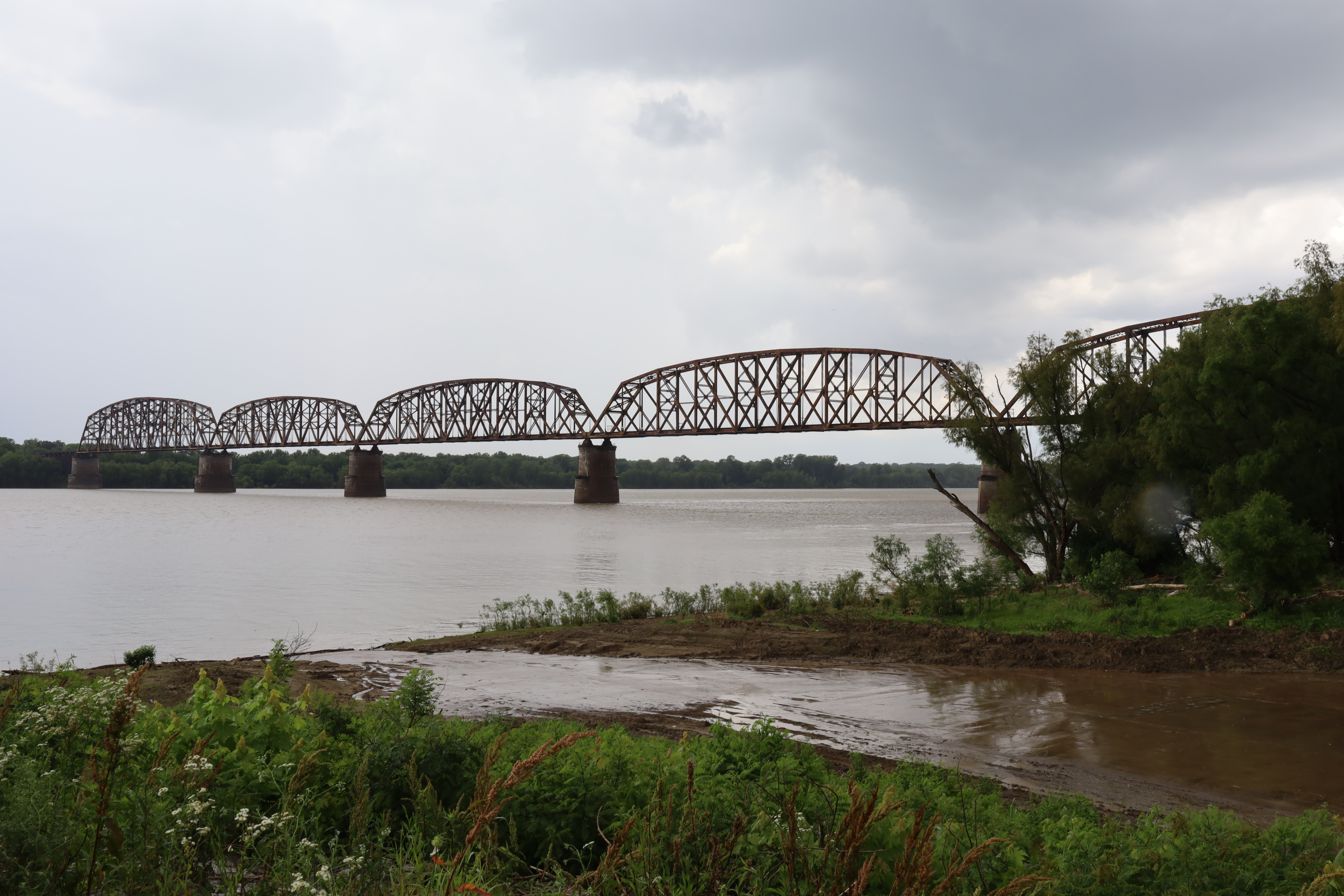
- The bridge in 2022
- Coordinates: 37.14461°N 88.74204°W
- Carries: Single track of Paducah & Illinois Railroad (jointly owned by Canadian National Railway, BNSF Railway and Paducah & Louisville Railway)
- Crosses: Ohio River
- Locale: Metropolis, Illinois and McCracken County, Kentucky
- Maintained by: Canadian National Railway (Operations) BNSF Railway (Maintenance)

Characteristics
- Design: Simple truss bridge, with plate-girder approaches
- Total length: 6,424 ft (1,958 m) (including approaches)
- Longest span: 708 ft (216 m)

History
- Opened: 1917

Statistics
- Daily traffic: Approximately 15 freight trains per day

The Metropolis Bridge is a railroad bridge which spans the Ohio River at Metropolis, Illinois. Originally built for the Chicago, Burlington and Quincy Railroad, construction began in 1914 under the direction of engineer Ralph Modjeski.

The bridge consists of the following: (from north to south)

- Deck plate-girder approach spans
- One riveted, 9-panel Parker through truss
- Five pin-connected, Pennsylvania through trusses
- One pin-connected, 8-panel Pratt deck truss
- Deck plate-girder approach spans

Total length of the bridge is 6,424 feet (1,958 m). The largest span stretches 708 feet (216 m), and remains the longest pin-connected simple through truss span in the world. Cost of the bridge when built was $4,000,000.

Not long after completion in 1917, ownership of the bridge was passed on to the Paducah and Illinois Railroad, a newly formed railroad jointly owned by the Chicago, Burlington and Quincy Railroad and Nashville, Chattanooga and St. Louis Railway. In 1925, the Illinois Central Railroad purchased a 1/3 share of the Paducah and Illinois Railroad, and assumed operations and maintenance, as the bridge served as an important link in their newly completed Edgewood-Fulton Cutoff route.

As of 2013, the bridge is still owned by the Paducah and Illinois Railroad, with operations managed by Illinois Central Railroad successor Canadian National Railway and bridge maintenance/inspection managed by the BNSF Railway, where it continues to see heavy use.
