= Elijah P. Curtis House =

Historic house in Illinois, United States

- U.S. National Register of Historic Places
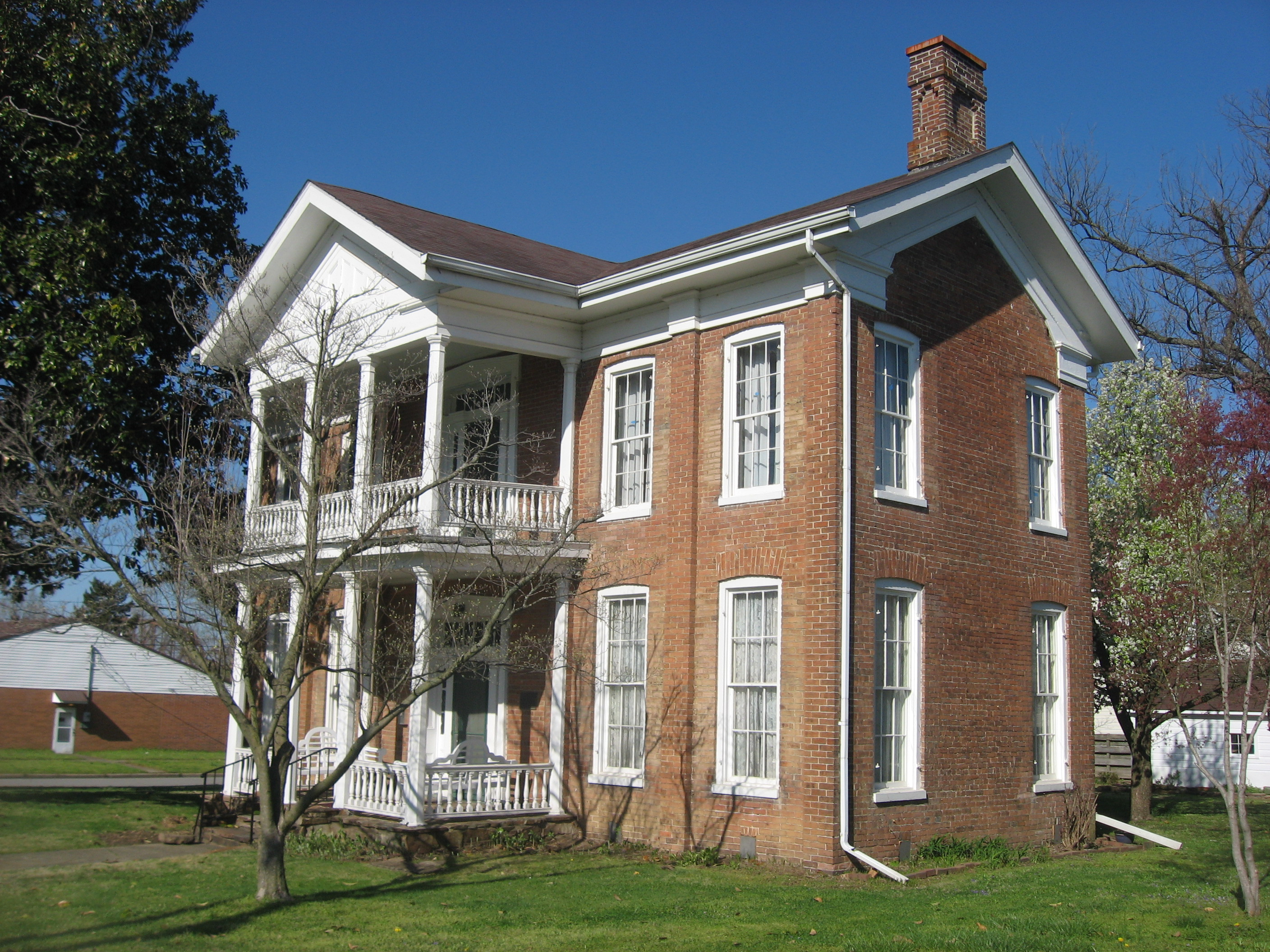

- Location within Illinois Location within the United States
- Interactive map showing the location of Elijah P. Curtis House
- Location: 405 Market St., Metropolis, Illinois
- Coordinates: 37°9′4″N 88°44′2″W
- Area: less than one acre
- Built: 1870
- Built by: Fardell, Joseph Alexander
- Architectural style: Classical Revival
- NRHP reference No.: 78001172
- Added to NRHP: June 9, 1978

The Elijah P. Curtis House is a historic house located at 405 Market Street in Metropolis, Illinois. The Classical Revival house was built in 1870 for Elijah P. Curtis. The house was added to the National Register of Historic Places in 1978 and now houses the Massac County Historical Museum.

== History ==
Born in 1834, Elijah P. Curtis settled in Massac County at a young age. Curtis earned his law degree in 1860 and practiced law prior to the outset of the Civil War. After the war began, Curtis and two other men organized the first volunteer Union regiment from Massac County. In 1863, Curtis was promoted to the rank of major. Curtis continued his work as a lawyer after the war.

Curtis commissioned his historic house in 1870. The house's builder, Joseph P. Farrell, was a local artisan renowned for the quality of his work. The house remains well-preserved and was added to the National Register of Historic Places on June 9, 1978. The Massac County Historical Society currently owns the home, which it uses as the Massac County Historical Museum.

== Architecture ==
The Curtis House is a two-story brick building designed in the Classical Revival style. A two-story entrance portico dominates the front facade of the home. The portico is supported by octagonal columns, features a porch with a balustrade on both stories and is topped by a triangular pediment. The first and second story entrance feature identical doorways with transoms, sidelights, and flanking pilasters. Two double-hung six-over-six windows are located on both stories on each side of the portico; the windows are separated by brick pilasters. The house's interior has a symmetrical plan with two main rooms on each floor and a central foyer and staircase.
