= Decapolis (disambiguation) =

Decapolis was a group of ten cities on the eastern frontier of the Roman Empire in Syria and Judea.

Decapolis or Dekapolis (Greek: Δεκάπολις) refers to a group or confederation of ten cities. It may also refer to:

== History ==
- Isaurian Decapolis in Cilicia
- Decapolis of Katakekaumene, in Lydia
- Décapole, alliance of ten towns of the Holy Roman Empire in Alsace, 1354-1679

== See also ==
- Dodecapolis (disambiguation)
