= Massac Memorial Hospital =

Geography
- Location: 28 Chick St., Metropolis, Illinois, United States
- Coordinates: 37.1662°N 88.7396°W

Organization
- Funding: Non-profit hospital
- Type: Community

Services
- Emergency department: Yes
- Beds: 25

History
- Opened: April 14, 1956

Links
- Website: Massac Memorial Hospital
- Lists: Hospitals in Illinois

Massac Memorial Hospital is a 25-bed general medical and surgical hospital located in Metropolis, Illinois, United States. In 2011, the hospital had 1,002 admissions, 10,031 emergency department visits, and 25,365 outpatient visits.

== Services ==
The hospital has cardiopulmonary, cardiac rehabilitation, laboratory, physical therapy, speech therapy, occupational therapy, radiology, surgery, sleep medicine, and transitional care departments. Inpatient services offered include hospitalists and an infection isolation room. Diagnostic and therapeutic imaging services include a CT scanner, a diagnostic radioisotope facility, magnetic resonance imaging (MRI), multislice spiral CT, and ultrasound. The hospital offers access to specialists in cardiology, family practice, geriatrics, internal medicine, pathology, radiology, gastroenterology, ophthalmology, ENT, and audiology. A dialysis center opened in 2009.

== Administration ==
Rick Goins is chief executive officer. Randall Rushing is chief financial officer. Kathy May is chief nurse officer.

== History ==
The hospital accepted its first patient on April 14, 1956. Since then, the hospital has undergone several renovations and expansions. In 1964, it was expanded to include 13 additional patient rooms, a second x-ray room, a new recovery room, a second nurse's station and communication system, an enlarged medical records room and a cafeteria bar in the dining room, solarium, examination room, doctor's library, lounge/conference room, new pantry, enlarged business office, relocated chapel, new pediatrics ward, expanded basement, improved laundry and maintenance facilities, autopsy and morgue room and an additional elevator.

In 1973, a medical annex was constructed in the south side of the facility with space for six doctor's offices.

In 1982, the original south patient wing was demolished to allow for construction of a six-bed intensive-cardiac care unit. Also added in 1982 were a relocated and enlarged emergency department, an updated x-ray department with two rooms, improved medical records facilities, a larger laboratory and a relocated and improved respiratory therapy department.

A 1994 addition included state-of-the-art surgical rooms, a recovery room and an outpatient procedure room. A new patient registration area was built along with renovation and expansion of the emergency department to 7 beds.

The federal Balanced Budget Act of 1997 created the Critical Access Hospital Program as a safety net to assure Medicare beneficiaries access to health services in rural area. Following this, Massac Memorial was designated as a Critical Access Hospital.

The most recent renovation and construction project included three separate building additions, which included 12 new private patient rooms, a special care unit, emergency department, Imaging department, outpatient registration, outpatient lobby, gift shop, laboratory, recovery room, and business office.

== Staff ==
As of 2011, Massac Memorial Hospital employees 22 full-time registered nurses, 12 full-time licenses practical nurses, 1 part-time physician, 25 part-time registered nurses, and 4 part-time licensed practical nurses.
