= Batman Day =

Annual event

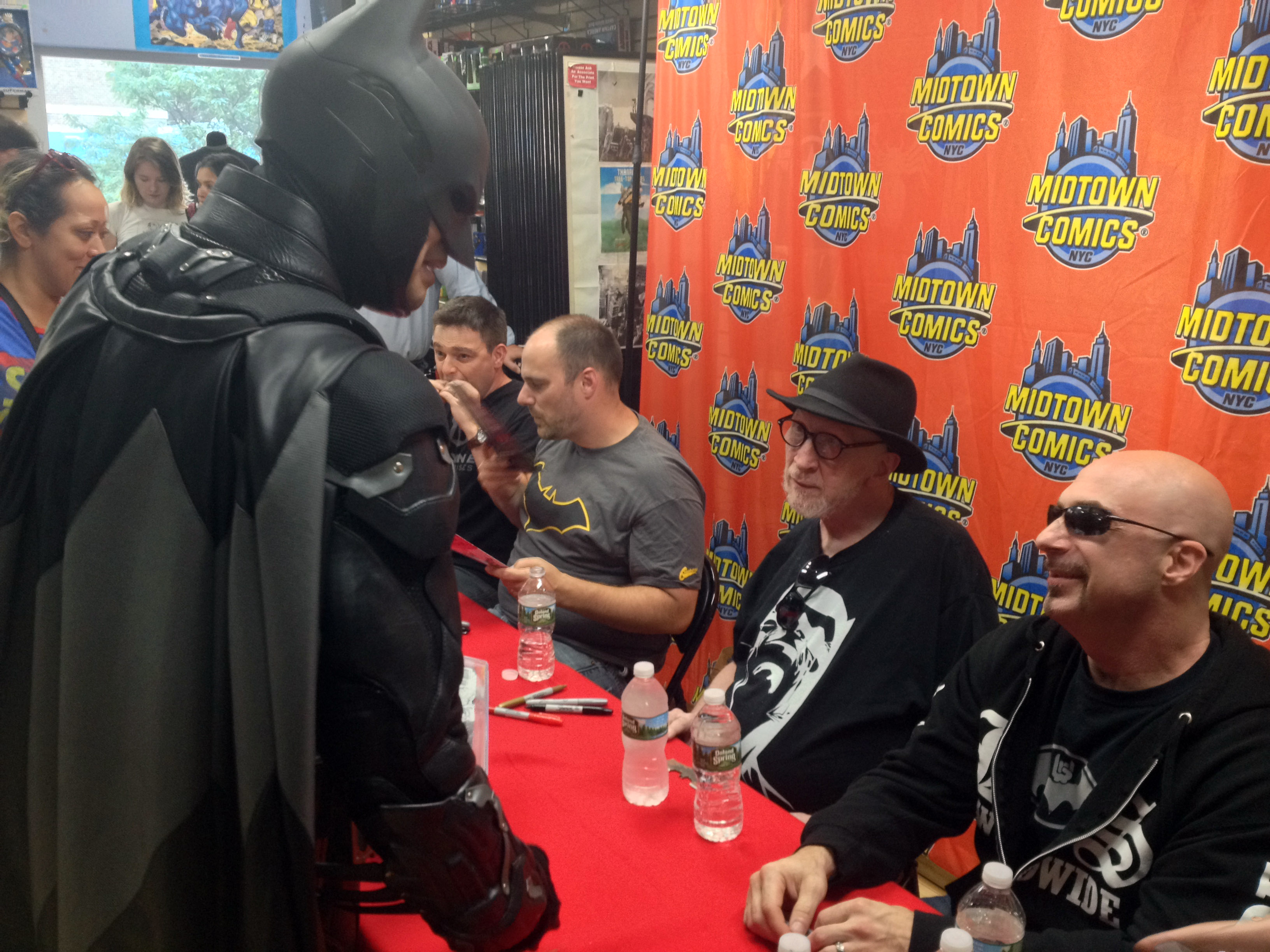
- The third Batman Day at Midtown Comics, where a person dressed as Batman meets writers and artists including Frank Miller and Greg Capullo.
- Observed by: Batman fans
- Type: Secular
- Significance: Celebrating Batman
- Date: third Saturday in September
- First time: 2014

Batman/Batgirl Day is an annual event organized by DC Entertainment to celebrate and promote Batman.

The first Batman Day was July 23, 2014. It was a date selected by DC Comics and Warner Bros. to celebrate Batman's 75th anniversary and coincide with San Diego Comic-Con 2014. Subsequent Batman Days have been on either the third or fourth Saturday in September.

The actual anniversary date of the first appearance of Batman in Detective Comics #27 is March 30, 1939.

Batman Day was established by DC Comics, Warner Bros. and DC Entertainment after the first Superman Day was celebrated on June 12, 2013.

== Events ==
List of Batman Days
| Year | Date | Refs |
|---|---|---|
| 2014 | July 23 | |
| 2015 | September 26 | |
| 2016 | September 17 | |
| 2017 | September 23 | |
| 2018 | September 15 | |
| 2019 | September 21 | |
| 2020 | September 19 | |
| 2021 | September 18 | |
| 2022 | September 17 | |
| 2023 | September 16 | |
| 2024 | September 21 | |
| 2025 | September 20 | |
| 2026 | September 19 | |
