= Hawk Taylor =

American baseball player (1939–2012)

- Catcher / Outfielder
- Born: April 3, 1939; Metropolis, Illinois, U.S.
- Died: June 9, 2012 (aged 73); Paducah, Kentucky, U.S.
- Batted: Right Threw: Right

MLB debut
- June 9, 1957, for the Milwaukee Braves

Last MLB appearance
- September 22, 1970, for the Kansas City Royals

MLB statistics
- Batting average: .218
- Home runs: 16
- Runs batted in: 82
- Stats at Baseball Reference

Teams
- Milwaukee Braves (1957–1958, 1961–1963); New York Mets (1964–1967); California Angels (1967); Kansas City Royals (1969–1970)

Robert Dale "Hawk" Taylor (April 3, 1939 – June 9, 2012) was an American professional baseball player who appeared in 394 games over all or part of 11 Major League Baseball (MLB) seasons as a catcher and outfielder for the Milwaukee Braves (1957–58 and 1961–63), New York Mets (1964–67), California Angels (1967) and Kansas City Royals (1969–70). Born in Metropolis, Illinois, he threw and batted right-handed, and was listed as 6 feet 1 inch (1.85 m) tall and 187 pounds (85 kg).

== Early career ==
A nephew of former major league first baseman Ben Taylor, Hawk Taylor was a schoolboy sensation at Metropolis Community High School, where he batted .650 in 1957, his senior season. The Braves signed him to a $119,000 bonus contract, the highest in MLB history at the time.

The bonus rules then in force in baseball mandated that Taylor spend his first two pro seasons on the Braves' big-league roster, and he made his major league debut in June 1957 at the age of 18, appearing in seven games—almost exclusively as a pinch runner: he was given only one at bat by the future pennant- and World Series-winning Braves, and caught only one inning on defense. By his second season, 1958, the bonus rule had been amended and the Braves were permitted to option Taylor to the Class B Three-I League to gain valuable playing time. Recalled by Milwaukee after September 1 when rosters expanded, he appeared in four games, starting two as a left fielder, and notched his first MLB hit.

He then spent all of 1959 and 1960 sharpening his skills in the upper levels of the Braves' farm system, and was selected to the 1960 All-Star team as a catcher by the Triple-A American Association.

== Service with four MLB clubs ==
Taylor then was a member of the Braves' official major league roster for the full seasons of 1961–63. However, because of injury and service in the United States Army, he appeared in only 56 total games over those three campaigns. Eclipsed by hard-hitting Joe Torre as the Braves' catcher of the future, Taylor moved to the outfield, where he started 22 games and played all three outfield positions. He hit his first MLB home run on the final day of the 1961 season, a ninth-inning, pinch-hit blow off Mike McCormick that enabled Milwaukee to even the score at 2–2 against the San Francisco Giants at County Stadium, and paved the way to an eventual 3–2 Brave triumph in extra innings. Hampered by a broken collarbone in 1963, Taylor managed only two hits in 29 at bats all season, and on December 2 his contract was sold to the National League's tail-ending team, the New York Mets.

The Mets proceeded to give Taylor his most extended MLB opportunity. In 1964, he got into 92 games, including 45 as a catcher and 16 in the outfield, and set personal bests in hits (54) and runs batted in (23). His offense declined in both 1965 and 1966, although on August 17 of the latter season, he hit the first pinch-hit grand slam home run in Mets' history. After getting into only 13 games for the 1967 Mets and spending part of that year in the minor leagues, Taylor was acquired by the California Angels in July; the Angels' general manager, Fred Haney, had been Taylor's first-ever big-league manager. He batted .308 in limited duty (23 games and 52 at bats) for the Angels, spent 1968 in the minor leagues, and then was selected in the December 1968 Rule 5 draft by a brand-new expansion team, the Kansas City Royals. He was a member of the inaugural Royals' team in 1969 and performed creditably as a utilityman, with 24 hits and three home runs in 64 games, then added one more MLB season to his belt in a similar role for the 1970 Royals. Prior to the 1971 season, he was traded to the Boston Red Sox organization, and was playing with their Louisville Colonels affiliate when a back injury ended his career at the age of 32.

Over his 11 major league seasons, Taylor played in 394 games and had 724 at bats, 56 runs scored, 158 hits, 25 doubles, 16 home runs, 82 RBI and 36 walks, as well as a .218 batting average, .258 on-base percentage, .319 slugging percentage, 231 total bases, two sacrifice flies and four intentional walks. In the field, he appeared as a catcher in 131 games, as an outfielder in 63, and a first baseman in 15.

After his playing days ended, Taylor enjoyed coaching stints at Murray State University, Lambuth University and Paducah Community College. He was married to Marie Holifield Taylor for 49 years. The couple had two sons and two grandsons.

Hawk Taylor died at Western Baptist Hospital in Paducah, Kentucky, at 2:44 pm on June 9, 2012, at the age of 73.

== Sources ==
- Career statistics from Baseball Reference · Baseball Reference (Minors) · Retrosheet · Baseball Almanac
