= Cosmopolis =

Cosmopolis may refer to:

== Arts ==
=== Film ===
- Cosmopolis (film), a 2012 film by David Cronenberg based on the DeLillo novel
- Cosmopolis, a fictional city in the Speed Racer film adaptation

=== Literature ===
- Cosmopolis (novel), a 2003 novel by Don DeLillo
- Cosmopolis, an 1892 novel by Paul Bourget
- Cosmopolis: The Hidden Agenda of Modernity, a book by Stephen Toulmin
- Cosmopolis, the journal of the Jack Vance Integral Edition project.

=== Music ===
- Cosmopolis, a musical work by Elias Breeskin
- Cosmopolis, an album by Polish music band Brygada Kryzys

=== Television ===
- Cosmopolis, the fictional city in which the TV series Mission Hill is set

=== Other ===
- Cosmopolis, a fictional universe-wide magazine employed by novelist Jack Vance
- Cosmopolis lamps are a range of High-intensity discharge lamps produced by Signify N.V. (formerly, Philips Lighting).

== Places ==
- Cosmopolis, Washington, a city in the United States
- Cosmópolis, a municipality in the state of São Paulo in Brazil

== Publications ==
- Cosmopolis: An International Monthly Review, a defunct multilingual literary magazine published from 1896 to 1898

== Other ==
- Cosmopolis XXI, a planned Russian vehicle that is billed as a space tourism vehicle

== See also ==
- Ecumenopolis, a single continuous worldwide city
- Cosmopolitan (disambiguation)
