= Technopolis =

Technopolis, or variants may refer to:

== Places ==
Technopolis or Technology Park are synonyms for science park

- Technopolis (Belgium), science center and activity museum in Mechelen, Belgium
- Technopolis (Gazi), city of Athens enterprise to protect the Gazi Industrial Park in Greece
- Technopolis (Morocco), technology park in Rabat-Salé, Morocco
- Technopolis Innovation Park Delft, science park in Delft, the Netherlands
- Tecnópolis, science and technology park in Villa Martelli, Buenos Aires Province, Argentina

== Businesses ==
- Technopolis Oyj, corporation listed on the Helsinki Stock Exchange that operates science parks in several cities of Finland
- Technopolis Soft, re-branded as Game Technopolis, was the video game brand of Tokuma Shoten.
- Technopolis (Технополис), electronics retailer in Bulgaria

== Other ==
- "Technopolis", song by Yellow Magic Orchestra.
