= Dodecapolis =

Dodecapolis or Dodekapolis (Greek: Δωδεκάπολις) refers to a group or confederation of twelve cities. It may refer to:

- Ionian dodecapolis
- Aeolian dodecapolis
- Etruscan dodecapolis

== See also ==
- Decapolis (disambiguation)
- Pentapolis
