= Seuthes =

Seuthes may refer to:

- Seuthes I, king of the Odrysian Thracians from 424 BC until 410 BC.
- Seuthes II, king of the Odrysian kingdom of Thrace, from about 405 BC–391 BC.
- Seuthes III, king of the Odrysian kingdom of Thrace from ca. 330 BC to ca. 300 BC
- Seuthes, a general in the army of Dromichaetes.
- Seuthes, legendary father of Abaris the Hyperborean.
