= Astropolis =

Astropolis (from the Greek for city of stars) may refer to:

== In literature ==
- An idealised future civilisation, as in Eugene Jolas' Succession in Astropolis
- Astropolis, a science fiction cycle by Sean Williams

== Fictional structures ==
- Astropolis, a space station proposed by Krafft Arnold Ehricke
- "Astropolis: The First Space Resort", in Playboy magazine, November, 1968
- Asteromo, an orbiting arcology proposed by architect Paolo Soleri, sometimes called an Astropolis
