= Superman Celebration =

The Superman Celebration is an annual four-day festival held in Metropolis, Illinois, dedicated to honoring Superman and celebrating his legacy in popular culture. Since its inception in 1979, the event has drawn thousands of fans of all ages from around the world to the "Home of Superman". The festival includes events such as celebrity appearances, costume contests, art exhibits, and panel discussions, alongside a giant Superman statue.

The Superman Celebration is organized by a collaboration between the Metropolis Chamber of Commerce, the City of Metropolis, and the Greater Metropolis Convention & Visitors Bureau.

== Dates, guests and events ==
#	Year	Date	Main event	Celebrity guests	Special guests	Comic artists and writers	Official Superman	Special event
1	1979	June 1979	1st Superman Celebration					
2	1980	June 1980	2nd Superman Celebration					
3	1981	June 1981	3rd Superman Celebration					
4	1982	June 1982	4th Superman Celebration					
5	1983	June 1983	5th Superman Celebration					
6	1984	June 7–10, 1984	6th Superman Celebration	Margot Kidder				
7	1985	June 6–9, 1985	7th Superman Celebration					
8	1986	June 5–8, 1986	8th Superman Celebration	Kirk Alyn				First Superman statue, 7-foot fiberglass statue
9	1987	June 4–7, 1987	9th Superman Celebration					
10	1988	June 2–5, 1988	10th Superman Celebration					
11	1989	June 1–4, 1989	11th Superman Celebration	Noel Neill				
12	1990	June 7–10, 1990	12th Superman Celebration					
13	1991	June 6–9, 1991	13th Superman Celebration	Jack Larson				Jim Hambrick moves to Metropolis, IL
14	1992	June 4–7, 1992	14th Superman Celebration					Hambrick opens the Superman Museum
15	1993	Jun 3-6, 1993	15th Superman Celebration					New Superman Statue inauguration, 15-foot bronze statue
16	1994	June 2–5, 1994	16th Superman Celebration	John Haymes Newton; Kirk Alyn; Phyllis Coates	Tommy Bond			
17	1995	June 8–11, 1995	17th Superman Celebration	Gerard Christopher	Travis Ford			
18	1996	June 6–9, 1995	18th Superman Celebration	Jack Larson				
19	1997	June 12–15, 1997	19th Superman Celebration	Noel Neill	George "Goober" Lindsey		Tom Nagy	
20	1998	June 11–14, 1998	20th Superman Celebration	Lane Smith		Jon Bogdanove; Rick Stasi		
21	1999	June 10–13, 1999	21st Superman Celebration	Alex Ross		Kerry Gammill; Rick Stasi		
22	2000	June 8–11, 2000	22nd Superman Celebration	Margot Kidder; Marc McClure	Mike Carlin; Noel Neill	Jeph Loeb; Ed McGuinness; Doug Hazelwood	Scott Cranford	
23	2001	June 7–10, 2001	23rd Superman Celebration	Jeff East; Valerie Perrine; Sarah Douglas; Jack O'Halloran	Noel Neill	Alex Ross; Kerry Gammill; John Thompson	Scott Cranford	
24	2002	June 6–9, 2002	24th Superman Celebration	Adam West; Julie Newmar; Noel Neill			Scott Cranford	
25	2003	June 12–15, 2003	25th Superman Celebration	Bob Holiday; Yvonne Craig	Larry Thomas Ward; Noel Neill	Steve Rude	Scott Cranford	Noel Neill became "The First Lady of Metropolis"
26	2004	June 10–13, 2004	26th Superman Celebration	Jackson Bostwick; Lou Ferrigno	Noel Neill		Scott Cranford	
27	2005	June 9–12, 2005	27th Superman Celebration	John Schneider; Margot Kidder; Noel Neill		Mark Waid; Steve Stanley; Lin Workman	Scott Cranford	
28	2006	June 7–10, 2006	28th Superman Celebration	Michael Rosenbaum	Noel Neill; Stephan Bender	Michael Dougherty; Steve Rude; Marv Wolfman	Scott Cranford	
29	2007	June 7–10, 2007	29th Superman Celebration	Helen Slater	Noel Neill; Jerry Maren	Jon Bogdanove; Len Wein; Jake Black; Lin Workman; Kevin Williams; Steve Stanley; Jake Black; Andrew Chandler; Jay Chuppe; Anton Wade; Janet Wade	Scott Cranford	
30	2008	June 12–15, 2008	30th Superman Celebration	Allison Mack; Ned Beatty; Noel Neill	Michael Eury; Josh Elder; Marc Tyler Nobleman	Murphy Anderson; Lin Workman; Dave Beaty; Antone Wade; Micah Stewart; Jason Rawley; Eddy Zeno; Lonnie Cruse; Bruce Scivally	Josh Boltinghouse	
31	2009	June 11–14, 2009	31st Superman Celebration	Justin Hartley; Phil Morris	Noel Neill; Beverly Washburn	Mike Norton; Gail Simone; John Ostrander; Daniel Peretti; Larry Ward	Josh Boltinghouse	
32	2010	June 10–13, 2010	32nd Superman Celebration	Laura Vandervoort; Sam Witwer	Noel Neill; Ilya Salkind; Carmine Infantino	Dave Beaty; Josh Elder; Trevor Hawkins	Josh Boltinghouse	Noel Neill's Lois Lane Bronze Statue inauguration
33	2011	June 9–12, 2011	33rd Superman Celebration	Mark Pillow; Tracey Lewis; Brandon Routh	Alaina Huffman; Sam Huntington	Dave Beaty; Josh Elder; Jamal Igle; Freddie Williams II; Trevor Hawkins	Josh Boltinghouse	
34	2012	June 7–10, 2012	34th Superman Celebration	John Glover; Cassidy Freeman	Gerard Christopher; John Rockwell; Sandra Taylor; Noel Neill	George Pérez; Terry Beatty; Larry Tye; Larry Ward; Dean Zachary; Jim Hall	Josh Boltinghouse	
35	2013	June 7–10, 2013	35th Superman Celebration	Michael Rosenbaum; Alessandro Juliani	Margot Kidder; Tracy Scoggins; Laurie Mitchell Roberts; Gregory Moffett	Art Baltazar; Brett Breeding; Ron Frenz; Chris Sprouse	Josh Boltinghouse	
36	2014	June 12–15, 2014	36th Superman Celebration	Dean Cain; Billy Dee Williams	Valerie Perrine; Aaron Smolinski	Elliott S! Maggin; Ken Bailey; Sean Dulaney; Lonnie Easterling; Charles Ettinger; Jim Hall; Mitch Foust; Jason Rawley; Tyrone Reed; Dean Zachary	Josh Boltinghouse	
37	2015	June 11–15, 2015	37th Superman Celebration	Candice Patton; Caity Lotz; John Shea; Stacy Haiduk; Diane Sherry Case		Kurt Busiek; Alex Saviuk; Mike Norton; John Jackson Miller; Randyl Bishop; Ken Bailey; Sean Dulaney; Lonnie Easterling; Mitch Foust; Benjamin Glendenning; Jim Hall	Josh Boltinghouse	
38	2016	June 9–12, 2016	38th Superman Celebration	Mehcad Brooks; Peter Facinelli; Marc McClure; Michael Landes	Jon Schnepp; Holly Payne; Jerry "The King" Lawler	Jon Bogdanove; Rick Burchett; Brian K. Morris	Josh Boltinghouse	
39	2017	June 1–4, 2017	39th Superman Celebration	Dean Cain; James Marsters; Margot Kidder; Sarah Douglas		Amanda Conner; Jimmy Palmiotti; John Ostrander; Gwenda Bond; Todd Aaron Smith	Josh Boltinghouse	
40	2018	June 7–10, 2018	40th Superman Celebration	Brandon Routh; Shaun Sipos; Blake Ritson	Jack O'Halloran; Jeff East; Aaron Smolinsky; Ilya Salkind; John Newton	Alex Saviuk; Art Baltazar; Michael Eury; Peter Poplaski; Philo Barkhart	Josh Boltinghouse	
41	2019	June 6–9, 2019	41st Superman Celebration	Helen Slater; Erica Durance; Katrina Law		Marv Wolfman	Josh Boltinghouse	
Cancelled	2020		Cancelled	Cancelled	Cancelled	Cancelled	Cancelled	Cancelled
42	2021	July 30-August 1, 2021	42nd Superman Celebration	Stacy Haiduk; K Callan; Ian Mitchell Smith; Nicholle Tom		Chad Hardin; Blake Armstrong; Ale’ Garza; Steven Walden; Mostafa Moussa; Jim Hall	Josh Boltinghouse	
43	2022	June 10–12, 2022	43rd Superman Celebration	George Newbern; Michael Rosenbaum; Tom Welling	Jeff East; Jack O'Halloran; Douglas B. Meyers; Michael Mammo	Rick Burchett; Trevor Hawkins	Josh Boltinghouse	
44	2023	June 9–11, 2023	44th Superman Celebration	Tyler Hoechlin; Nicole Maines; Jesse Rath	Sam J. Jones	Trina Robbins; Ed Gross	Josh Boltinghouse	
45	2024	June 7–9, 2024	45th Superman Celebration	Elizabeth Tulloch; Brandon Routh; Kristin Kreuk; Mark Pillow; Gil Adler	Gregory Moffett; Beverly Washburn; Raushan Hammond	Karl Kesel; Zach Howard; Mark Spears; Ed Gross; Todd Aaron Smith; Steve Walden	Josh Boltinghouse	Action Comics #1 Mural inauguration
46	2025	June 13–15, 2025	46th Superman Celebration	Dean Cain; Michael Ironside; Odette Annable; Anais Fairweather	Bob McLeod			
47	2026	June 12–14, 2026	47th Superman Celebration	Caity Lotz; Alex Garfin	Tim Daly; Neva Howell	Don Kramer; Scott Godlewski; Stuart Sayger	Josh Boltinghouse	
