= Hierapolis (disambiguation) =

Hierapolis or Hieropolis (Greek for sacred/Holy city) may refer to these Ancient cities in different Roman provinces of the Hellenistic world, and several former (now titular) (arch)bishoprics having see in such city :

in modern Turkey

- Hierapolis, in Phrygia Pacatiana Secunda, near modern Pamukkale, south-western Turkey.
  - Hierapolis in Phrygia remains a Latin Catholic Metropolitan titular archbishopric
- Hierapolis ad Pyramum or Castabala, in Cilicia Secunda, near modern Adana, south-east Turkey
  - a Latin Catholic titular bishopric, but under the name Castabala
- Hierapolis in Isauria,
  - a Latin Catholic Titular bishopric with see in the above city
- Hierapolis of the Phrygian Pentapolis, modern Koçhisar, Sandıklı, near Afyonkarahisar, central Turkey
- Hieropolis Comana, in Cappadocia (central Turkey)

in modern Syria

- Hierapolis Euphratensis or Hierapolis Bambyce, in Roman Syria Euphratensis Prima, modern Manbij, north-central Syria
- as Hierapolis in Syria, the above city is the nominal see of three Catholic successor titular sees :
  - the Latin Catholic Metropolitan titular archbishopric of Hierapolis of the Romans
  - the Melkite Catholic Titular Archbishopric of Hierapolis of the Melkites
  - the Syrian Titular Bishopric of Hierapolis of the Syrians

== See also ==
- Hierakonpolis, a Hellenistic city of Upper Egypt
