= Antipolis =

Antipolis, Greek for 'city opposite' (another), is the name or part of the name of:

- modern Antibes
- Sophia-Antipolis

It is also the name of a tanker ship owned by Andriaki Shipping.
