= Metropolis, Illinois =

- City
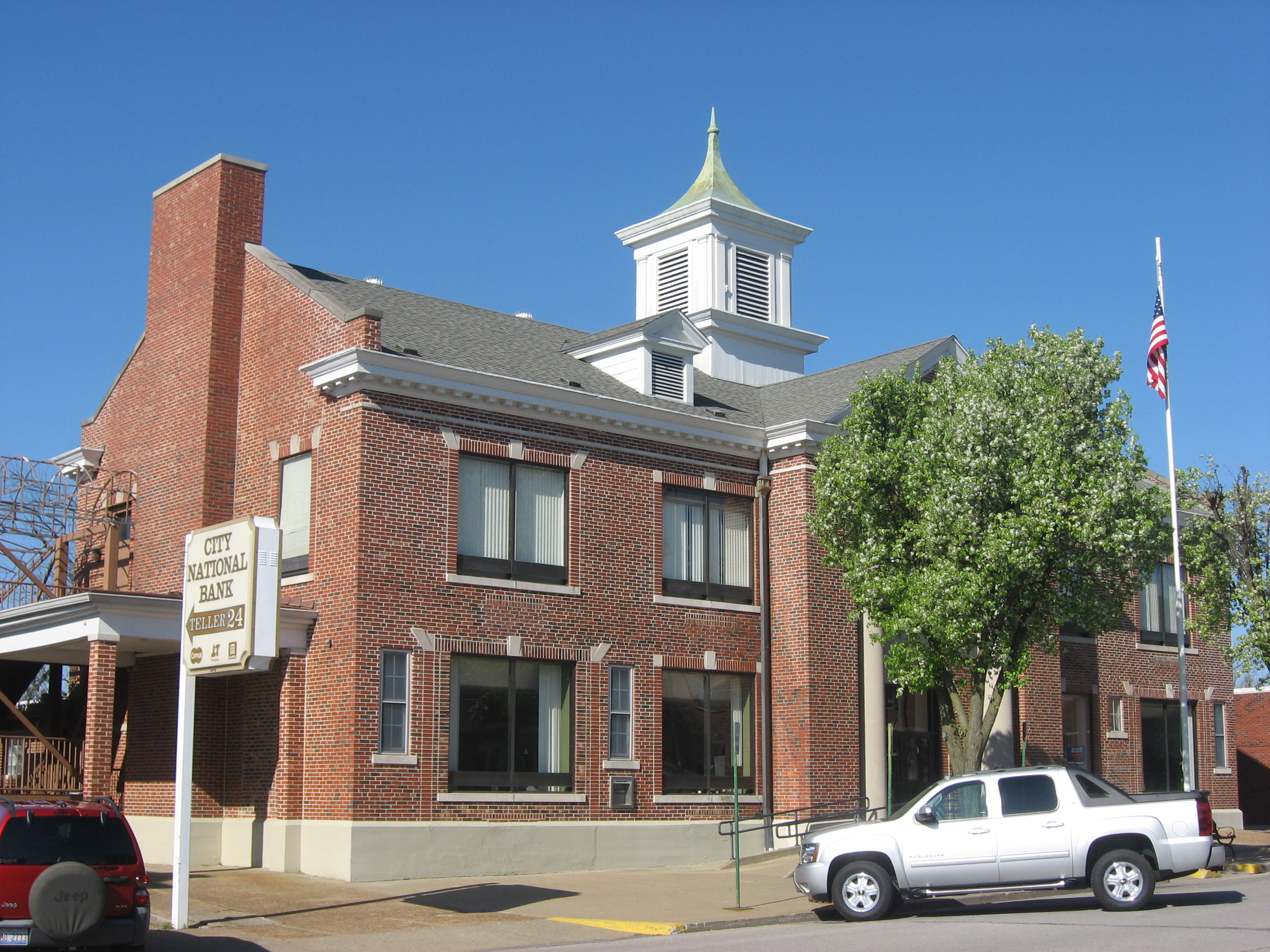
- City hall (2013)
- Interactive map of Metropolis, Illinois
- Location within Illinois Location within the United States
- Coordinates: 37°08′49″N 88°41′28″W
- Country: United States
- State: Illinois
- County: Massac

Area
  - Total: 6.16 sq mi (15.96 km^{2})
  - Land: 6.02 sq mi (15.59 km^{2})
  - Water: 0.14 sq mi (0.37 km^{2})
- Elevation: 328 ft (100 m)

Population (2020)
  - Total: 5,969
  - Density: 991.6/sq mi (382.84/km^{2})
- Time zone: UTC−6 (CST)
  - Summer (DST): UTC−5 (CDT)
- ZIP code: 62960
- Area code: 618
- FIPS code: 17-48645
- GNIS feature ID: 2395106
- Website: metropolisil.gov

Metropolis is a city and the county seat in Massac County, Illinois, United States. It is located by the Ohio River. As of the 2020 census, it had a population of 5,969, down from 6,537 in 2010. Metropolis is part of the Paducah metropolitan area in Southern Illinois.

== History ==
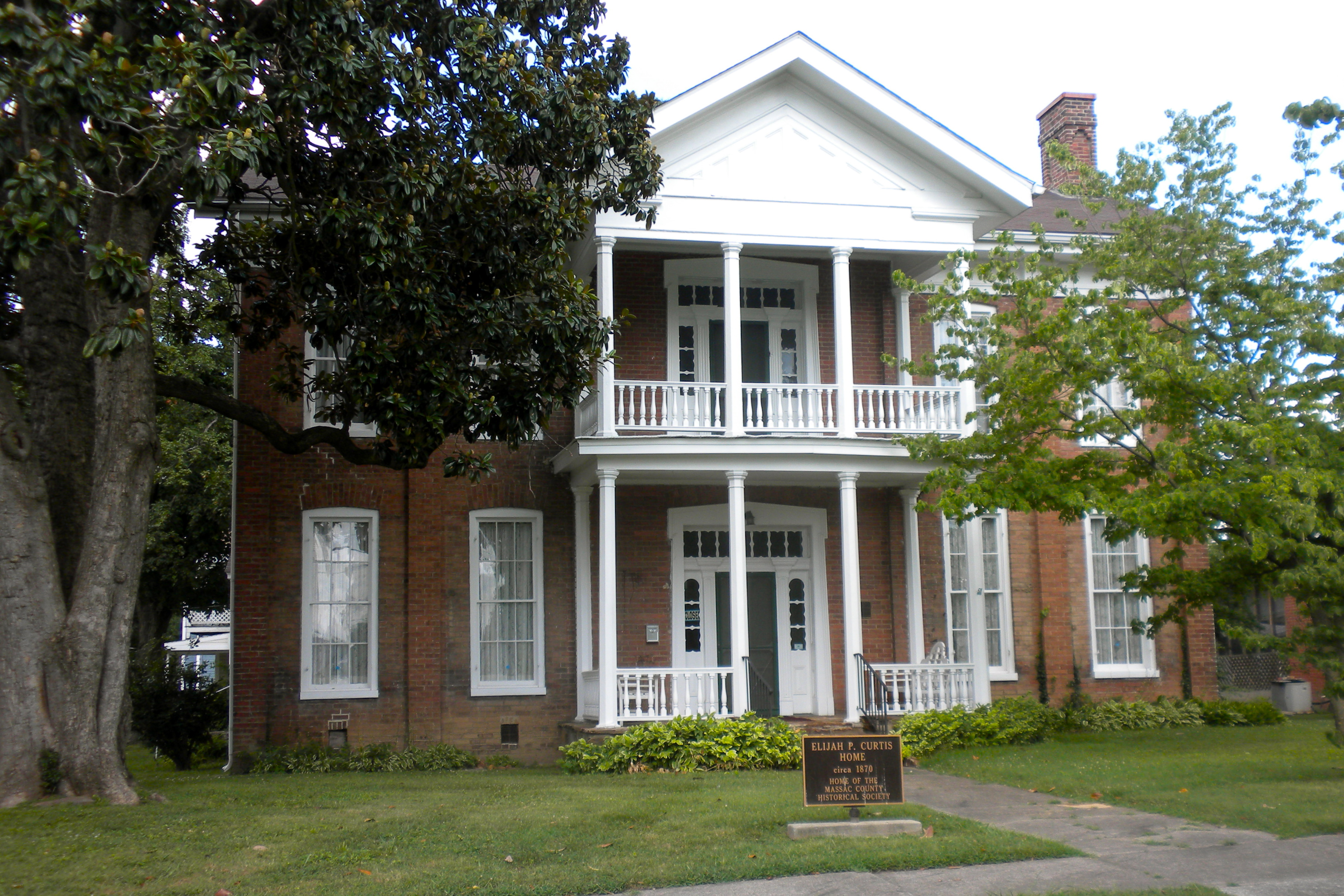
Elijah P. Curtis House (2010)

Located on the Ohio River, the Metropolis area has been settled by many different peoples throughout history. For thousands of years, varying cultures of Native Americans populated the area. The most complex society was the Mississippian culture, which reached its peak around AD 1100 and built a large city at Cahokia, near the Mississippi River and present-day Collinsville, Illinois, to the north opposite St. Louis, Missouri. Its people built large earthworks and related structures, many of which have been preserved and protected at the UNESCO World Heritage Site. Mississippian culture regional centers arose throughout the Ohio and lower Mississippian valleys, where the rivers were part of widespread trading routes used for exchange with other cultures.

In 1757, Massac County was settled by a French expedition, which built Fort de L'Ascension (later called Fort Massac) for use during the French and Indian War against the British (the war is also known as the Seven Years' War, which took place largely in Europe). The garrison at the fort was able to resist a Cherokee attack during the war. Afterward the defeated French abandoned the fort, and many moved west of the Mississippi River to escape British rule. When the victorious British colonists arrived to take control of territory ceded by the French, the Chickasaw had already destroyed the fort.

During the American Revolutionary War, the mostly ethnic French residents of the town were sympathetic to the rebels. George Rogers Clark led American troops into the Illinois country, landing near Metropolis. Afterward in 1794 during the Northwest Indian War, President George Washington ordered Fort Massac reconstructed at a strategic site high above the Ohio River. The fort was severely damaged by the 1811–12 New Madrid earthquakes. Rather than rebuild, the US military abandoned the facility in 1814, as its forces were needed further west. Local settlers scavenged the timbers and left little behind of the original construction materials.

This section of the state was largely settled by migrants from the Upper South, and many brought slaves with them. It was years after Illinois was admitted as a free state that all such slaves gained their freedom.

The city of Metropolis was founded in 1839 near the site of Fort Massac by a merchant from Pittsburgh and a local land owner; the two envisioned that the location on the Ohio River would become a transport hub and chose a befittingly grand name. In 1843, the Illinois Legislature formed Massac County. The McCartney family became leaders in building the town of Metropolis.

During the early years of the American Civil War, soldiers were encamped in the vicinity. Although Illinois was established as a free state, this section had many southern sympathizers. Despite this background, the state stayed with the Union during the war.

Prior to the American Civil War, some groups worked to establish a Western District of Columbia, to include present-day Metropolis and the nearby area of Kentucky. An 1850 map illustrates this proposal.

During the twentieth century, agriculture has continued to be the economic driver of the region. The state's authorization of riverboat gambling led to Metropolis's becoming the site of the Harrah's Metropolis casino/hotel, a riverboat casino frequented by visitors from around the region. Tourism is one of the city's largest industries.

Metropolis is also the site of the Honeywell Uranium Hexafluoride Processing Facility, which converts milled uranium into uranium hexafluoride for nuclear reactors.

== Geography ==
Metropolis is located in southern Massac County on the north shore of the Ohio River. It is bordered to the south, across the river, by McCracken County, Kentucky. Paducah, Kentucky, is 13 miles (21 km) to the southeast.

According to the U.S. Census Bureau, Metropolis has a total area of 6.16 square miles (15.95 km^{2}), of which 6.02 square miles (15.59 km^{2}) are land and 0.14 square miles (0.36 km^{2}), or 2.30%, are water.

== Demographics ==
Historical population
Census	Pop.	Note	%±
1860	1,098		—
1870	2,490		126.8%
1880	2,668		7.1%
1890	3,573		33.9%
1900	4,009		12.2%
1910	4,655		16.1%
1920	5,055		8.6%
1930	5,573		10.2%
1940	6,287		12.8%
1950	6,093		−3.1%
1960	7,339		20.4%
1970	6,940		−5.4%
1980	7,171		3.3%
1990	6,734		−6.1%
2000	6,482		−3.7%
2010	6,537		0.8%
2020	5,969		−8.7%
U.S. Decennial Census

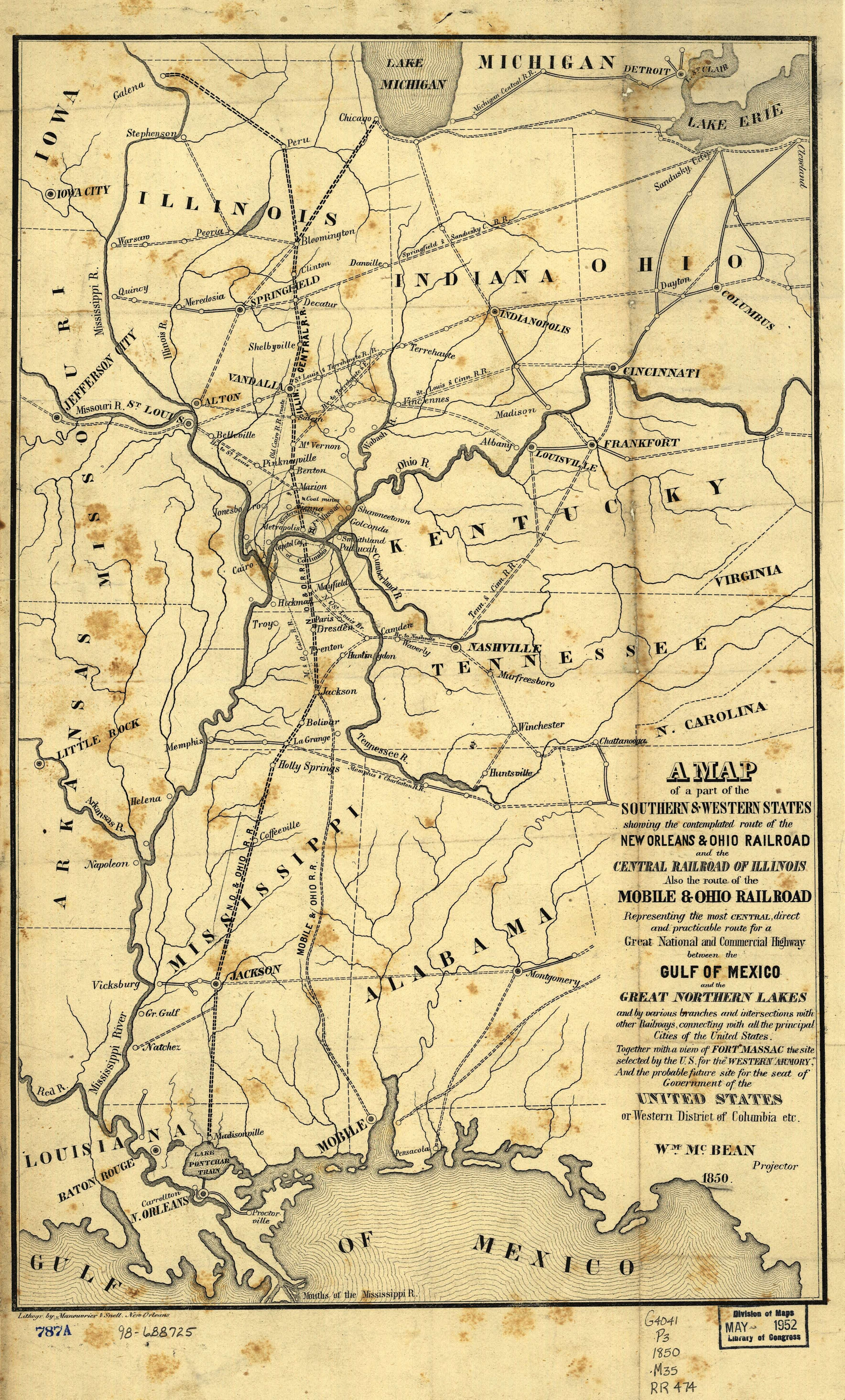
1850 map showing the proposed "Western District of Columbia" spanning the Ohio River at Metropolis. Modern maps do not show a "Capitol City" on the Kentucky side.

=== 2020 census ===
As of the 2020 census, Metropolis had a population of 5,969. The median age was 41.4 years. 23.3% of residents were under the age of 18 and 21.4% of residents were 65 years of age or older. For every 100 females there were 86.6 males, and for every 100 females age 18 and over there were 82.0 males age 18 and over.

96.7% of residents lived in urban areas, while 3.3% lived in rural areas.

There were 2,547 households in Metropolis, of which 29.1% had children under the age of 18 living in them. Of all households, 34.8% were married-couple households, 21.2% were households with a male householder and no spouse or partner present, and 36.9% were households with a female householder and no spouse or partner present. About 37.7% of all households were made up of individuals and 18.6% had someone living alone who was 65 years of age or older.

There were 3,004 housing units, of which 15.2% were vacant. The homeowner vacancy rate was 5.0% and the rental vacancy rate was 11.6%.

Racial composition as of the 2020 census
Race	Number	Percent
White	4,847	81.2%
Black or African American	571	9.6%
American Indian and Alaska Native	25	0.4%
Asian	30	0.5%
Native Hawaiian and Other Pacific Islander	4	0.1%
Some other race	103	1.7%
Two or more races	389	6.5%
Hispanic or Latino (of any race)	179	3.0%

=== 2000 census ===
As of the 2000 census, there were 6,482 people, 2,896 households, and 1,708 families residing in the city. The population density was 1,295.1 inhabitants per square mile (500.0/km^{2}). There were 3,265 housing units at an average density of 652.3 per square mile (251.9/km^{2}). The racial makeup of the city was 90.53% White, 7.61% African American, 0.20% Native American, 0.20% Asian, 0.45% from other races, and 1.02% from two or more races. Hispanic or Latino of any race were 0.74% of the population.

There were 2,896 households, out of which 24.4% had children under the age of 18 living with them, 43.6% were married couples living together, 11.9% had a female householder with no husband present, and 41.0% were non-families. 36.9% of all households were made up of individuals, and 20.0% had someone living alone who was 65 years of age or older. The average household size was 2.13 and the average family size was 2.77.

In the city the population was spread out, with 20.0% under 18, 7.8% from 18 to 24, 25.4% from 25 to 44, 21.9% from 45 to 64, and 24.8% ages 65 or older. The median age was 43 years. For every 100 females, there were 79.5 males. For every 100 females age 18 and over, there were 75.0 males.

The median income for a household in the city was $25,371, and the median income for a family was $33,979. Males had a median income of $27,630 versus $17,561 for females. The per capita income for the city was $15,967. About 12.5% of families and 17.2% of the population were below the poverty line, including 21.8% of those under age 18 and 16.7% of those age 65 or over.

== Transportation ==
Metropolis is served by Interstate 24, which runs from Chattanooga, Tennessee, northwest to Williamson County, Illinois, where it connects with Interstate 57. U.S. Route 45 passes through the center of Metropolis as East 5th Street, Ferry Street, and West 10th Street. US 45 runs geographically east–west through the area but runs north to Chicago and south to Paducah and is signed north–south.

Illinois Route 145 lies east of the city and serves remote areas of nearby Shawnee National Forest.

Metropolis is served by the Paducah & Illinois Railroad, jointly owned by Canadian National Railway, BNSF Railway, and the Paducah & Louisville Railway, crossing the Ohio River on the Metropolis Bridge.

== Healthcare ==
Metropolis is home to Massac Memorial Hospital, a 25-bed critical access hospital that opened in 1956. Originally shaped like a cross, the hospital is located on the northwest side of town. The hospital has undergone several renovations and additions to make updates to the original facility. Current services offered include ambulance, cardiac rehabilitation, cardiopulmonary, emergency department, imaging, laboratory, Massac Memorial Medical Clinic, rehabilitation services, sleep disorders center, specialty clinic, surgery, and transitional care. A Fresenius Medical Care dialysis center was constructed on the campus and opened in 2009.

== Superman's "hometown" ==
In his various portrayals, Superman resides in a fictional American city named Metropolis, and on April 25, 1972, the Illinois State Legislature passed Resolution 572, commending Metropolis for its "Project Superman" community program.

The city has a 15-foot-tall (4.6 m) painted bronze statue of Superman which sits in front of the county courthouse, and a statue of Noel Neill's Lois Lane from The Adventures of Superman stands just a few blocks away.

Each year on the second weekend of June, Superman fans from all over the world gather in Metropolis for their annual Superman Celebration, which features celebrity guests from movies, television, and the comic book industry.

Since June 1979, the Metropolis Chamber of Commerce had organized 44 editions of the Superman Celebration.

The four-day annual celebration also boasts vendors selling food, comics, homemade crafts, and other merchandise, as well as discussion panels, auctions, a costume contest, and a variety of other events throughout the weekend. The first such celebration was organized by local civic clubs and took place in June 1979.

The local newspaper is named The Metropolis Planet, inspired by The Daily Planet, the fictional paper in the Superman comics and other Superman media.

DC Comics would eventually cameo the real-life Metropolis in the 1994 story "Massacre in Metropolis!" (Superman Vol. 2 #92), as a town whose citizens idolize what is to them the real-life Man of Steel. A villain named Massacre arrives in the town, having gotten lost and thinking he was in the "other" Metropolis, the large city where Superman actually lives. He attacks a security guard and threatens many citizens in order to get proper directions to Superman's Metropolis.

== Notable people ==
- Dale Anderson, Maryland politician; born in Metropolis.
- Dustin Burnett (aka Zayde Wolf), musician, singer-songwriter
- Buddy Hall, member of pocket billiards Hall of Fame; born in Metropolis.
- Christopher Jackson, actor known for playing George Washington in the original Broadway cast of Hamilton
- Annie Turnbo Malone, businesswoman, founder of the black beauty culture and Poro College
- Moxie Manuel, pitcher for two MLB teams
- Oscar Micheaux, pioneering African-American filmmaker and author
- John Riegger, Champions Tour golfer
- Jack Smith, driver with NASCAR
- John Steele, WWII paratrooper, landed on the pinnacle of the church tower in Sainte-Mère-Église on June 6, 1944, during Operation Overlord.
- Robert Franklin Stroud, convicted murderer known as the Birdman of Alcatraz
- Ben Taylor, first baseman for two teams
- Hawk Taylor, catcher for various teams; born in Metropolis
- Betty, Jean and Joanne Weaver, sisters who played in the All-American Girls Professional Baseball League
- Patrick Windhorst, Illinois state representative and attorney

== Gallery ==
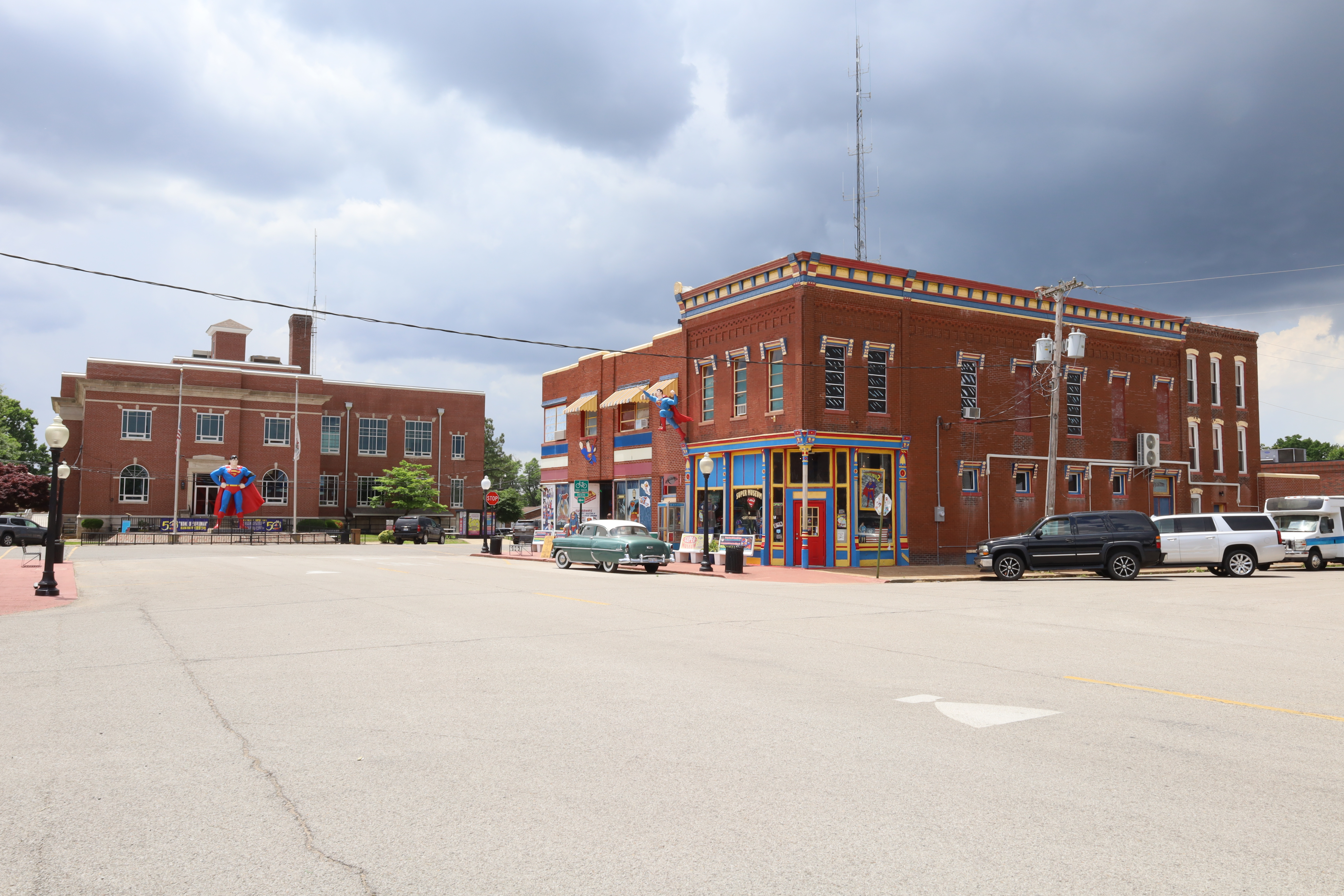
Massac County Courthouse with Superman statue (left) and Superman Museum (right)

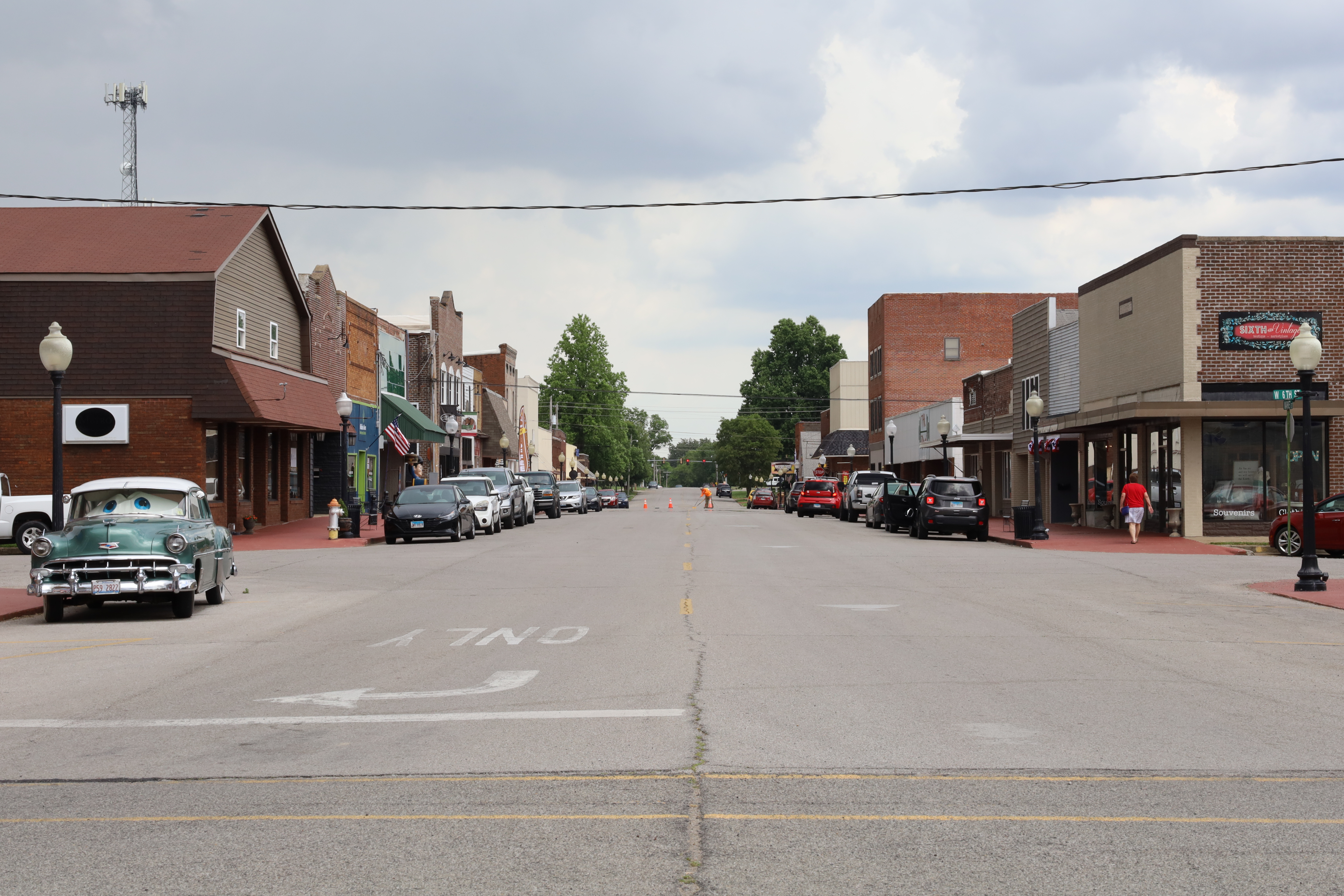
View up Market Street in 2022

Metropolis water tower with "Home of Superman" on the side

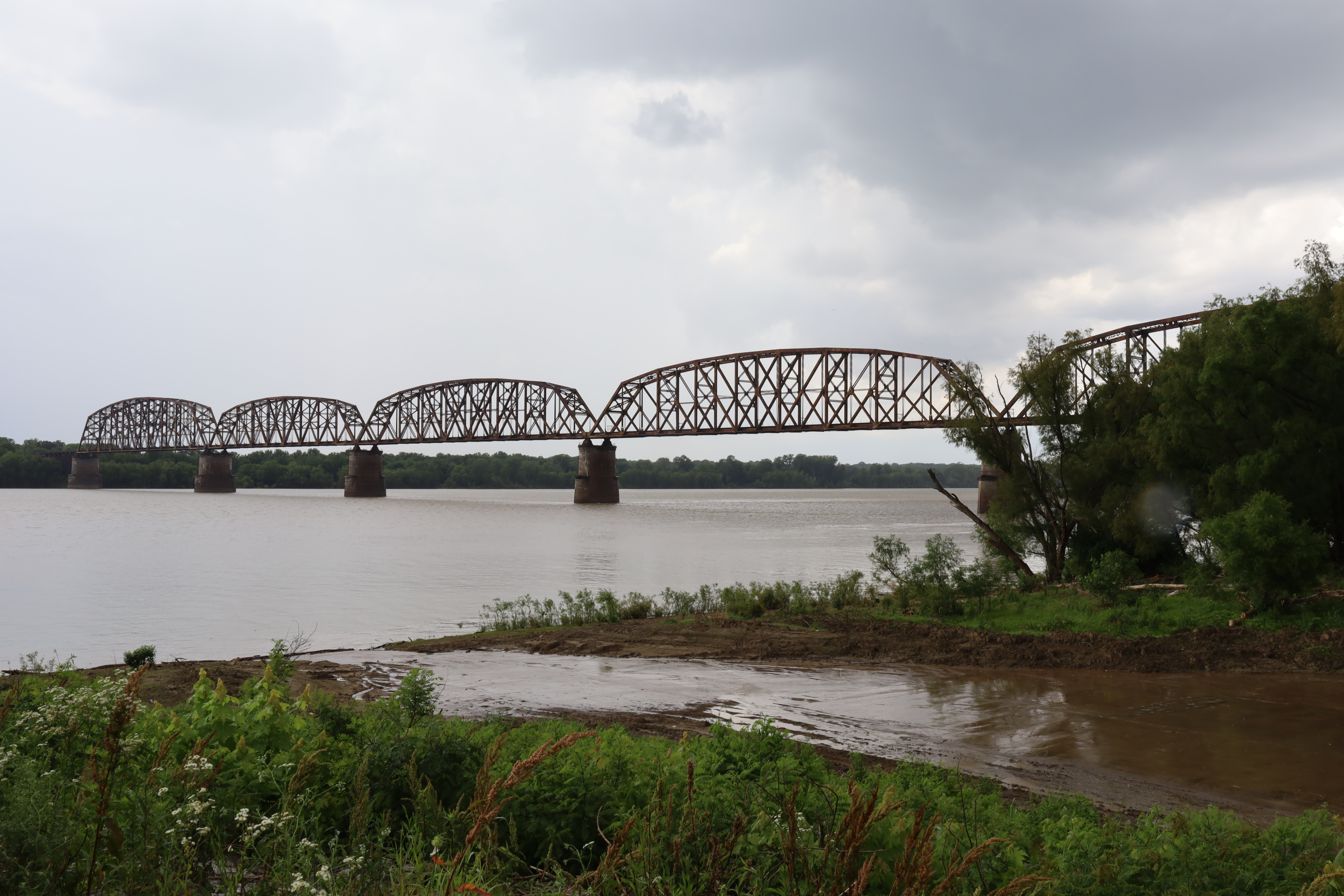
The Metropolis Bridge in 2022

== See also ==
- List of cities and towns along the Ohio River
