= Interstate 24 in Illinois =

Interstate Highway in Illinois, United States

Interstate 24
- I-24 highlighted in red

Route information
- Maintained by IDOT
- Length: 38.73 mi (62.33 km)
- Existed: August 18, 1964–present
- History: Completed January 24, 1976
- NHS: Entire route

Major junctions
- West end: I-57 in Pulleys Mill
- US 45 near Vienna; IL 146 near Vienna; US 45 in Metropolis
- East end: I-24 at the Kentucky state line in Metropolis

Location
- Country: United States
- State: Illinois
- Counties: Williamson, Johnson, Massac

Highway system
- Interstate Highway System; Main; Auxiliary; Suffixed; Business; Future; Illinois State Highway System; Interstate; US; State; Tollways; Scenic
← IL 23	→ US 24

Interstate 24 (I-24) is part of the Interstate Highway System that runs 316.36 miles (509.13 km) between Pulleys Mill, Illinois, and Chattanooga, Tennessee. In the U.S. state of Illinois, I-24 runs 38.73 miles (62.33 km) from its western terminus with I-57 to the Ohio River at the Kentucky state line near Metropolis. I-24 is located entirely in the southern portion of the state and is the most rural of Illinois' Interstate Highways. Despite this, the Interstate is part of a major corridor for traffic between the Southeastern United States and the St. Louis and Chicago urban areas.

When the Interstate system was first created in 1956, I-24 was to terminate in Nashville, Tennessee. An effort quickly arose to extend the Interstate to the northwest to improve connectivity between the Southeast and Midwestern United States. Several alignments for I-24 through Illinois were proposed over the next several years, including routes that would continue to St. Louis and others that would provide access to St. Louis via connections with other Interstate Highways. In 1963, an agreement was reached between the states of Illinois, Missouri, Kentucky, and Tennessee for I-24's extension, and this was approved by the Bureau of Public Roads (BPR), the predecessor to the Federal Highway Administration (FHWA), the following year. Construction on I-24 in Illinois began in 1968 with the Ohio River Bridge, and the Interstate was opened in three sections between 1974 and 1976.

== Route description ==
I-24 at the interchange with US 45 in Metropolis.

I-24 is maintained by the Illinois Department of Transportation (IDOT) along with all other non-tolled Interstate Highways, U.S., and state routes in Illinois. In 2025, annual average daily traffic counts ranged approximately from 18,500 vehicles south of Vienna to 28,600 vehicles at the Kentucky state line.

I-24 begins at exit 44 on I-57 in southern Williamson County, near the community of Pulleys Mill in Southern Illinois. Running in a northwest–southeast alignment through mostly farmland, the highway immediately heads through rural Johnson County, crossing a railroad and Illinois Route 37 (IL 37) without an interchange. The Interstate bypasses Goreville and Ferne Clyffe State Park to the east, before reaching an exit at Tunnel Hill Road, which serves Goreville and Tunnel Hill. The highway continues south through woodlands to its next exit at U.S. Route 45 (US 45) north of Vienna. It reaches its next exit at IL 146 in eastern Vienna a few miles later. I-24 heads southeast from Vienna into Massac County through additional farmland and woodlands. Its first exit in Massac County is at Big Bay Road next to Lake New Zeigler, which serves the communities of Big Bay and New Columbia. I-24 continues southward, crossing another railroad and bypassing the community of Round Knob before entering Metropolis. The highway meets US 45 again in Metropolis and passes west of Fort Massac State Park. It leaves Metropolis and crosses the I-24 Bridge over the Ohio River, a 5,623-foot-long (1,714 m) two-span tied-arch bridge, into Kentucky.

== History ==
=== Background and planning ===
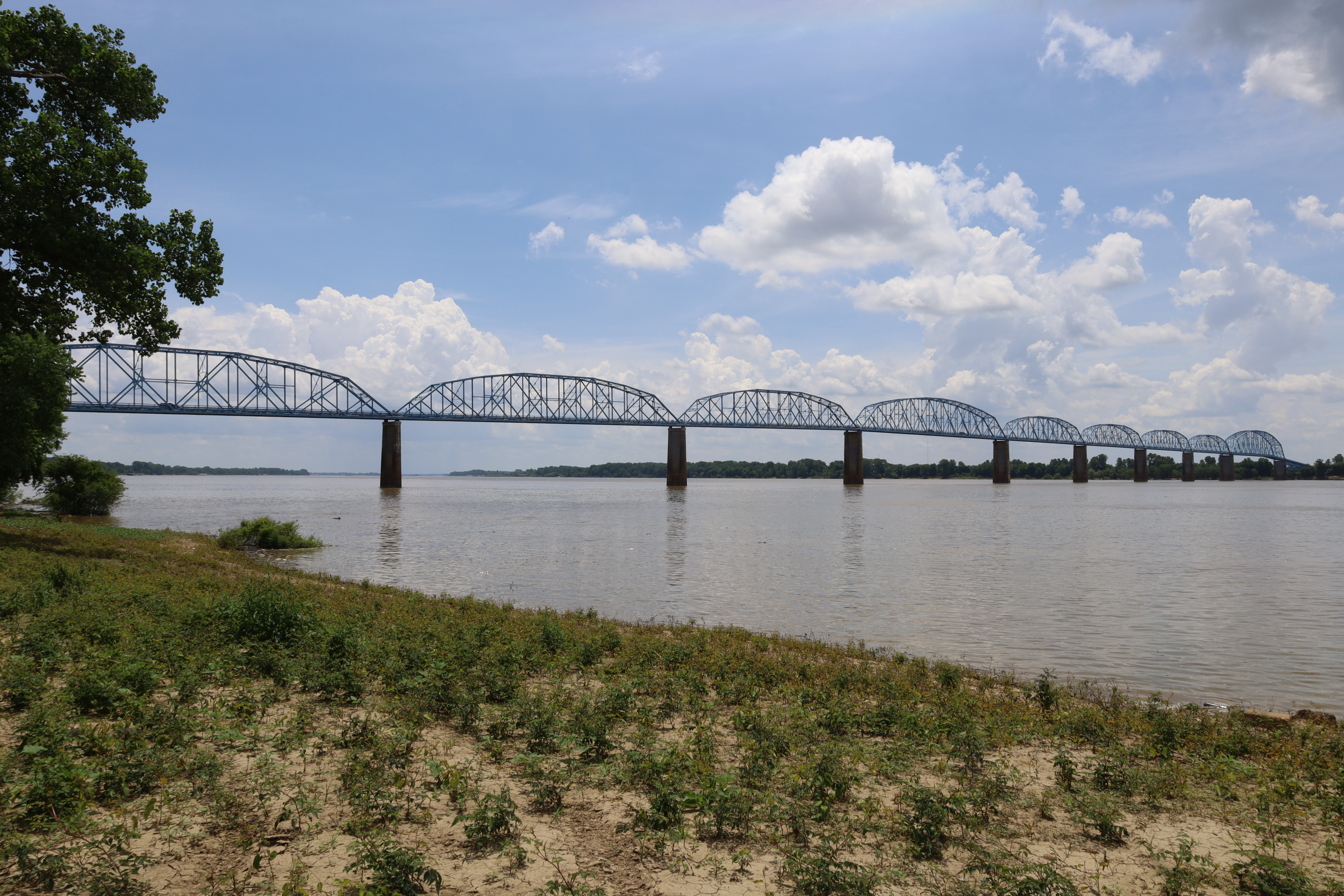
The Brookport Bridge opened in 1929 across the Ohio River between Illinois and Kentucky.

Before the advent of the automobile, several ferries operated crossings in Southern Illinois across the Ohio and Mississippi rivers. When the United States Numbered Highway System was established in 1926, several roads in Southern Illinois were given designations. One of these routes, US 45, would ultimately be supplanted by I-24. In 1929, the Brookport Bridge on this highway was completed across the Ohio River between Brookport, east of Metropolis, and Paducah.

When the Interstate Highway System was established in 1956, I-24 was to run between Nashville and Chattanooga, Tennessee. In 1957, Illinois joined Missouri, Kentucky, and Tennessee is an effort to improve connectivity between the St. Louis area and the Southeastern United States, which included extending I-24 northwest of Nashville. The first major proposal, which was included in a list of potential additions to the Interstate system on October 18, 1957, had I-24 cross the Ohio River from Kentucky and terminate with I-57 in Cairo. This was not designated at the time since the states has yet to reach an agreement on its exact location. Illinois highway officials first convened with Tennessee and Kentucky officials on three occasions in December 1957 to plan for the extension. The departments agreed on an alignment that terminated with I-57 near Pulleys Mill and crossed the river near Metropolis and Paducah, Kentucky. From the western terminus, traffic bound for St. Louis would take I-57 north to Mount Vernon, and then use I-64 westbound. They also studied a route through Evansville, Indiana, and another one that crossed the Ohio River near Golconda, but ruled these out. On December 20, 1957, the three agencies jointly submitted their recommendation in a letter to the Kentucky Division Engineer at the Bureau of Public Roads (BPR), the predecessor agency to the Federal Highway Administration. They next requested the BPR approve this alignment on January 15, 1958. The federal agency, which still favored a terminus near Cairo, did not act on this request.

In late 1958, a new alignment in Illinois was proposed to run through Herrin and Marion and cross the Ohio River between Golconda and Rosiclare. This was part of a longer "straight-line" route between St. Louis and Nashville that was proposed by a group composed of delegates from cities along the route who argued it was more cost effective. Due to the urging of BPR and Missouri officials, new conceptualizations arose by 1959 that had I-24 cross the Ohio River near Cairo and run in an east-west alignment, before crossing the Mississippi River into Missouri a short distance beyond. From here, the Interstate would continue to St. Louis or terminate with I-55 near Cape Girardeau or Charleston, Missouri. A crossing near Shawneetown was also proposed in 1959. Further complications arose as sentiments began to shift towards different alignments in Kentucky and Tennessee in 1960 and Tennessee withdrew from the 1957 agreement in February of that year. That year, an alignment that terminated with I-57 south of Marion and crossed the river near Metropolis was once again proposed.

In March 1961, officials in Metropolis protested a Cairo-to-St. Louis alignment at a meeting in Chicago after it was endorsed by Kentucky highway commissioner Henry Ward. Kentucky officials had included this alignment in their new conceptualization to comply with the BPR's request that the Ohio River crossing be near Cairo. Illinois officials requested Kentucky study the Pulleys Mill-to-Metropolis route, to which they agreed. In July 1961, another route to the east with a river crossing between Golconda and Rosiclare that terminated with I-57 in Marion near IL 13 was proposed by a group of Golconda businessmen. This quickly evolved into several different proposed alignments, including another crossing into Evansville, Indiana. On August 20, 1961, a five-person delegation composed of one from each of the four states and Indiana reached an agreement that I-24 should cross the Ohio River near Paducah, Kentucky. The routing of I-24 through Illinois still remained contentious, however.

=== Approval and construction ===
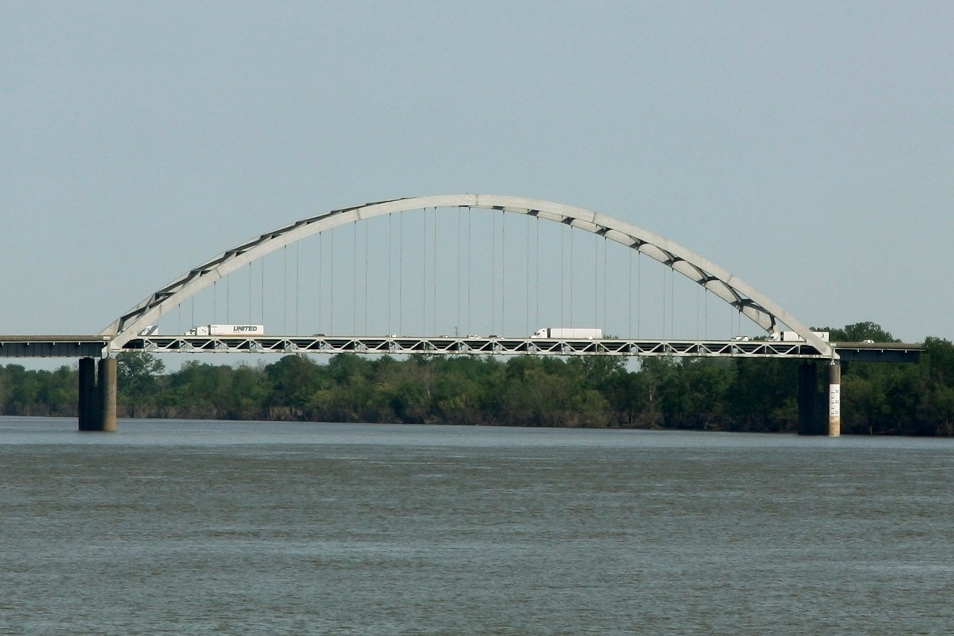
The Interstate 24 Ohio River Bridge which carries I-24 between Illinois and Kentucky.

By 1963, the Pulleys Mill-to-Metropolis route was still favored by officials in Illinois and Kentucky, although BPR, Cairo, and Missouri officials preferred the Cairo crossing. A consulting firm found the latter proposal to be more economically feasible in June of that year. The states also incorporated a new Interstate Highway, which was once proposed to be numbered I-24W, between I-55 in Hayti, Missouri, and I-40 in Jackson, Tennessee. This included a then-unbuilt bridge across the Mississippi River that had been proposed since the 1930s. On September 17, 1963, the governors of the four states, in a meeting with President John F. Kennedy, U.S. Secretary of Commerce Luther H. Hodges, and BPR Administrator Rex Marion Whitton, reached a compromise on the alignment for I-24's extension. This alignment included the route between Pulleys Mill and Metropolis. They also urged approval of the Hayti-to-Jackson Interstate, and Missouri Governor John M. Dalton said that his state would not accept the I-24 routing unless a bridge between Missouri and Tennessee was approved. However, Dalton agreed that the Cairo alignment, which would have crossed the Mississippi River approximately 20 miles (32 km) west of the Ohio River crossing, would have been too costly. On August 18, 1964, the BPR approved the new alignment for the western I-24 extension between Pulleys Mill and Nashville, as well as part of the Missouri-to-Tennessee Interstate, which they named I-155.

After it was approved, the section of I-24 in Illinois was authorized for engineering by 1966 and authorized for construction by 1968. In June 1968, construction began on the Ohio River bridge. Initially slated for completion in 1970, the project experienced many delays caused by poor weather and faulty welds that were repaired with bolts. The first section of I-24 in Illinois, located between US 45 in Vienna and US 45 in Metropolis, was dedicated and opened by Governor Dan Walker on January 15, 1974. On October 18, 1974, the stretch between US 45 in Metropolis and US 60 in Paducah, including the Ohio River bridge, opened to traffic. This was also the first stretch of I-24 to open in Kentucky. The final segment of I-24 in Illinois, located between I-57 and US 45 in Vienna, was dedicated and opened to traffic by Governor Walker on January 24, 1976. In its early years, the Ohio River Bridge was inspected more frequently due to design problems that arose during construction. On August 3, 1979, the bridge was closed to all traffic after structural problems were discovered during an inspection, including 119 cracks that resulted from defective welding in the tie girders. On October 16, 1980, the westbound span reopened with one lane in each direction and a prohibition of trucks and other heavy vehicles. Both spans fully reopened to all traffic with all four lanes on May 12, 1981.

== Exit list ==
County	Location	mi	km	Exit	Destinations	Notes
Williamson	Southern Precinct	0.00	0.00	44	I-57 – Chicago, Memphis	Western terminus; I-57 exit 44; signed as exits 44A (south) and 44B (north) using I-57 exit numbering
Johnson	Tunnel Hill	7.22	11.62	7	CR 12 (Tunnel Hill Road) – Tunnel Hill, Goreville	
Johnson	Bloomfield	13.64	21.95	14	US 45 – Vienna, Harrisburg	
Johnson	Vienna	16.00	25.75	16	IL 146 – Vienna, Golconda	
Massac	Georges Creek Precinct	26.55	42.73	27	CR 10 (Big Bay Road) – New Columbia, Big Bay	No services
Massac	Metropolis	37.16	59.80	37	US 45 – Metropolis, Brookport	Access to Fort Massac State Park; rest area
Ohio River		38.73	62.33	Interstate 24 Ohio River Bridge		
Ohio River		38.73	62.33		I-24 east – Nashville	Continuation into Kentucky
1.000 mi = 1.609 km; 1.000 km = 0.621 mi: Closed/former; Concurrency terminus; Incomplete access; Unopened

Interstate 24
Previous state: Terminus	Illinois	Next state: Kentucky
