= Illinois Route 148 =

State highway in southern Illinois, US

Illinois Route 148
- IL 148 highlighted in red

Route information
- Maintained by IDOT
- Length: 54.85 mi (88.27 km)
- Existed: 1926–present

Major junctions
- South end: IL 37 in Pulleys Mill
- I-57 in Pulleys Mill
- North end: IL 37 / IL 142 in Mt. Vernon

Location
- Country: United States
- State: Illinois
- Counties: Williamson, Franklin, Jefferson

Highway system
- Illinois State Highway System; Interstate; US; State; Tollways; Scenic
← IL 147	→ IL 149

Illinois Route 148 is a north–south state road in southern Illinois. It runs from Illinois Route 37 at Pulleys Mill (near the intersection of Interstate 24 and Interstate 57) north to the western terminus of Illinois Route 142 and Illinois 37 south of downtown Mount Vernon. This is a distance of 54.85 miles (88.27 km).

== Route description ==
Illinois 148 is a western parallel of Illinois 37 from Pulleys Mill to Mount Vernon. It passes through the city of Herrin, a medium-sized city in Williamson County. It is a two-laned surface road for its entire length.

== History ==
SBI Route 148 ran from Marion to Mount Vernon. In 1964 it was extended south to Pulleys Mill. There have been no changes to Illinois 148 since.

== Major Intersections ==
County	Location	mi	km	Destinations	Notes
Williamson		0.0	0.0	IL 37 – Goreville, Marion	
Williamson		0.6	0.97	I-57 to I-24 east – Mt. Vernon, Memphis, Nashville	I-57 exit 45
Williamson	Herrin	9.8	15.8	IL 13 – Carbondale, Marion	
Franklin	Zeigler	21.2	34.1	IL 149 (Main St) – Royalton, West Frankfort	
Franklin	Christopher	27.0	43.5	IL 14 (Egyptian Ave) – Du Quoin, Benton	
Franklin	Sesser	34.1	54.9	IL 154 west – Pinckneyville	South end of IL 154 concurrency
Franklin	Sesser	34.8	56.0	IL 154 east (Franklin Ave)	North end of IL 154 concurrency
Jefferson	Mt. Vernon	54.85	88.27	IL 37 (10th St) / IL 142 south (Veterans Memorial Dr) – Benton, McLeansboro	
1.000 mi = 1.609 km; 1.000 km = 0.621 mi: Concurrency terminus
