= Tunnel Hill =

Tunnel Hill may refer to:

- Tunnel Hill, Georgia, USA
- Tunnel Hill, Illinois, USA
- Tunnel Hill, Ohio, USA
- Tunnelhill, Pennsylvania, USA
- Tunnel Hill, Worcestershire, England

== See also ==
- Tunnel (disambiguation)
- Hill (disambiguation)
