= Illinois Route 169 =

State highway in southern Illinois, US

Illinois Route 169
- Karnak Road
- IL 169 highlighted in red

Route information
- Maintained by IDOT
- Length: 9.04 mi (14.55 km)
- Existed: 1949–present

Major junctions
- West end: IL 37 in Karnak
- East end: US 45 in New Columbia

Location
- Country: United States
- State: Illinois
- Counties: Pulaski, Massac

Highway system
- Illinois State Highway System; Interstate; US; State; Tollways; Scenic
← IL 167	→ IL 170

Illinois Route 169 is an east–west state road in far southern Illinois. It runs from Illinois Route 37 north of Grand Chain east to U.S. Route 45 east of Boaz. This is a distance of 9.04 miles (14.55 km).

== Route description ==
Illinois 169 is the southernmost main arterial route between Illinois 37 and U.S. 45. It is also the southernmost east–west state route in Illinois. Illinois 169 is a two-lane surface road for its entire length.

== History ==
SBI Route 169 originally ran from Shelbyville to Dalton City on what is now Illinois Route 128. It was moved to its current route in 1949.

== Major intersections ==
County	Location	mi	km	Destinations	Notes
Pulaski		0.00	0.00	IL 37	
Massac		9.04	14.55	US 45	
1.000 mi = 1.609 km; 1.000 km = 0.621 mi
