= Ferne Clyffe State Park =

State park in Illinois

- IUCN category III (natural monument or feature)
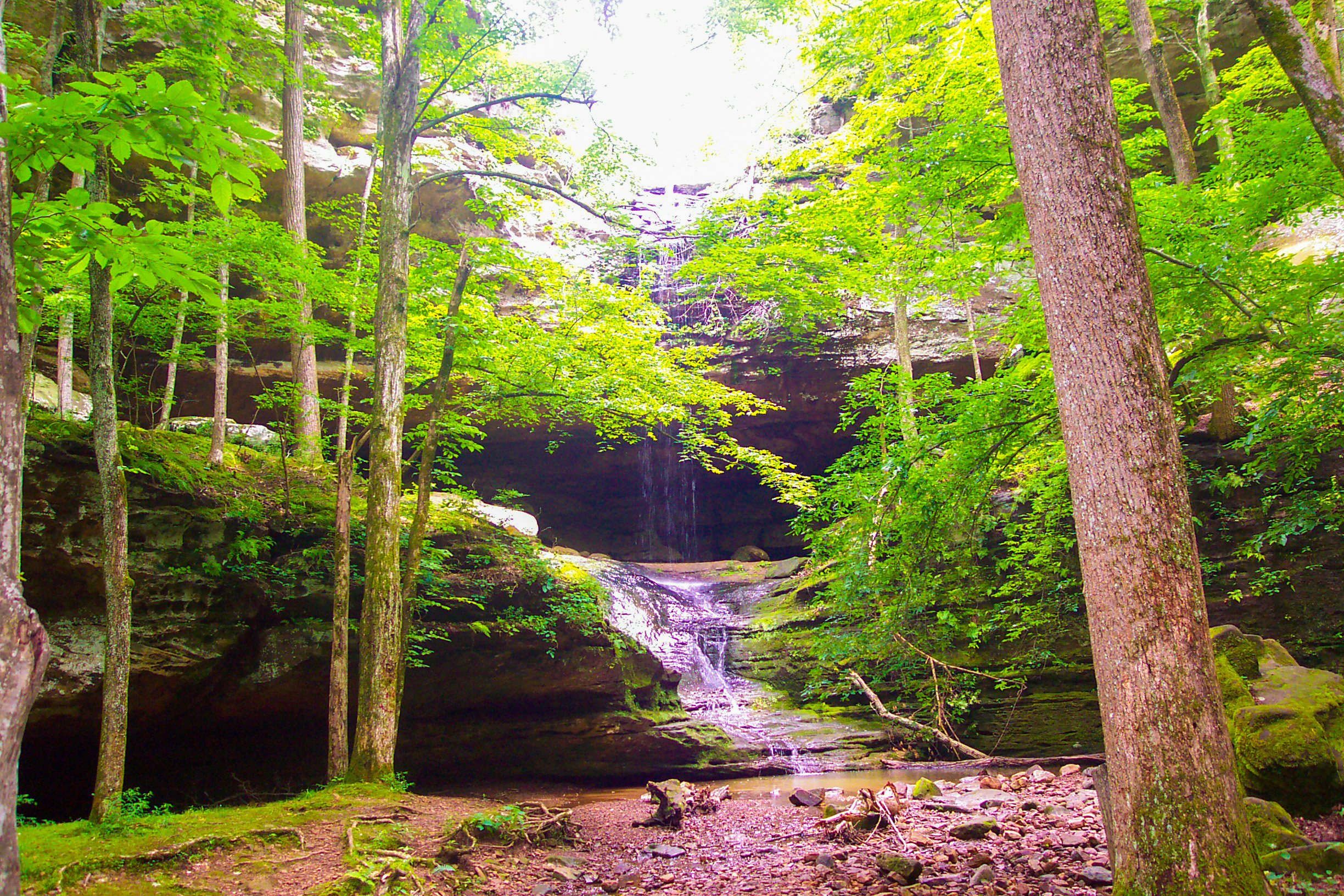
- Waterfall at Ferne Clyffe State Park, Big Rocky Hollow Trail, June 2009

- Location within Illinois Location within the United States
- Location: Johnson County, Illinois, USA
- Nearest city: Goreville, Illinois
- Coordinates: 37°31′46″N 88°58′58″W
- Area: 2,430 acres (983 ha)
- Established: 1949
- Governing body: Illinois Department of Natural Resources

Ferne Clyffe State Park is an Illinois state park on 2,430 acres (983 ha) in Johnson County, Illinois, United States. The nearest town is Goreville, Illinois, and the nearest connection to a limited-access highway is at Exit 7 on the Illinois portion of Interstate 24. The land for the park was purchased by the state in 1949 from Emma Rebman, and the park is currently operated by the Illinois Department of Natural Resources (IDNR). The original entrance to the park, located on the outskirts of Goreville, was found to be a potentially hazardous driving route, and was replaced by a new entrance located on Illinois Route 37 in the early 1980s. Although traffic upon it has been practically non-existent since 1982, Ferne Clyffe is also accessible to US Bicycle Route 76 by way of a spur trail along the east side of IL 37.

== Natural Features ==
Ferne Clyffe's acreage holds a number of notable geographic features, including limestone bluffs, naturally forested woodlands, cliff caves, and several small seasonal waterfalls fed by runoff from the upper bluffs in the area.

== Ferne Clyffe Lake ==
In the late 1950s, the IDNR constructed an earthen dam across Buck Branch Creek. An artificial lake, Ferne Clyffe Lake, had filled by 1960.
