= Illinois Route 37 =

State highway in southern Illinois, US

Illinois Route 37
- IL 37 highlighted in red

Route information
- Maintained by IDOT
- Length: 155.07 mi (249.56 km)
- Existed: November 5, 1918–present

Major junctions
- South end: US 51 / IL 3 in Cairo
- I-64 in Mt. Vernon; US 50 in Salem
- North end: US 45 in Watson

Location
- Country: United States
- State: Illinois
- Counties: Alexander, Pulaski, Johnson, Williamson, Franklin, Jefferson, Marion, Fayette, Clay, Effingham

Highway system
- Illinois State Highway System; Interstate; US; State; Tollways; Scenic
| ← US 36 | → IL 38 |

Illinois Route 37, Illinois 37 or IL 37, is a 155.07-mile-long (249.56 km) north–south state highway in southern Illinois. IL 37's southern terminus is at U.S. Route 51 (US 51) and IL 3 in Cairo and the northern terminus is at US 45 in Watson.

== Route description ==
Between Effingham and a point near Watson, a segment in which it shared a route with U.S. Route 45, Illinois 37 has been decommissioned in favor of US 45. Between Watson and just north of Salem, it angles westward and toward the south before meeting US 50 at Salem, Illinois 15 and Illinois 142 at Mount Vernon, Interstate 64 south of Mount Vernon, Illinois 14 and Illinois 34 at Benton, Illinois 149 at West Frankfort, Illinois 13 at Marion, and US 51 and Illinois 3 at its current southern terminus at Urbandale. Both of Illinois Route 148's termini branch from Route 37, the north terminus at Mount Vernon, and the southern terminus just north of Pulley's Mill. It has no direct connection to Interstate 24, which is far better approached from Interstate 57.

All of Illinois 37 is an undivided surface route.

== History ==
Originally connecting Effingham to Cairo, it was a heavily-traveled highway before Interstate 57 was opened. That Interstate, which lies very close to most of Illinois 37 (indeed the entire route north of Pulleys Mill), supplanted it as a through route. Illinois 37 was long a part of the most direct route between Chicago and Memphis. Illinois 37 has become a route of local significance instead of the busy, long-distance, inter-city highway that it was until the 1970s. As a town-to-town route, it especially serves communities which have no access to Interstate 57.

== Major intersections ==
| County | Location | mi | km | Destinations | Notes |
|---|---|---|---|---|---|
| Alexander | Cairo | 0.0 | 0.0 | US 51 / IL 3 north / Great River Road (National Route) – Cairo | |
| Pulaski | Olmstead | | | Mounds | former US 51 north |
| Pulaski | New Grand Chain | 21.4 | 34.4 | IL 169 east – Karnak | |
| Johnson | West Vienna | 32.0 | 51.5 | IL 146 – Anna, Vienna | |
| Williamson | Viena | 45.6 | 73.4 | IL 148 north to I-57 – Herrin | |
| Williamson | Marion | 55.1 | 88.7 | IL 13 (Deyoung Street) / Lincoln Heritage Trail (Southern Branch) to I-57 – Carbondale, Harrisburg | short 4 lane section at intersection with Illinois 37 in Marion |
| Williamson | Johnston City | | | To Broadway Boulevard / I-57 – Herrin, Business District | |
| Franklin | West Frankfort | 65.9 | 106.1 | IL 149 (Main Street) to I-57 – Zeigler, Thompsonville | 4 lanes for entire length through West Frankfort |
| Franklin | Benton | 73.0 | 117.5 | IL 14 west / IL 34 east (Main Street) to I-57 – Christopher, Harrisburg | South end of IL 14 overlap; traffic circle around Franklin County Courthouse |
| Franklin | Benton | 73.9 | 118.9 | IL 14 east (Bailey Lane) / Lincoln Heritage Trail (Southern Branch) – McLeansboro | North end of IL 14 overlap |
| Franklin | Whittington | 78.8 | 126.8 | IL 154 west to I-57 – Rend Lake | |
| Jefferson | Mt. Vernon | 92.4 | 148.7 | I-64 to I-57 – East St. Louis, Evansville | I-64 exit 80 |
| Jefferson | Mt. Vernon | 94.2 | 151.6 | IL 142 south / IL 148 south (Veterans Memorial Drive) / Lincoln Heritage Trail – Waltonville, McLeansboro | |
| Jefferson | Mt. Vernon | | | IL 15 east (Broadway Street) – Fairfield | |
| Jefferson | Mt. Vernon | | | IL 15 west (Main Street) to I-57 / I-64 – Ashley | |
| Jefferson | Dix | | | To Dix-Irving Road / I-57 | |
| Marion | Centralia | 110.0 | 177.0 | IL 161 west to I-57 – Centralia | |
| Marion | Salem | 117.4 | 188.9 | US 50 (Main Street) / Lincoln Heritage Trail – Sandoval, Flora | |
| Marion | Kinmundy | | | First Street - Louisville | |
| Fayette | Farina | 136.1 | 219.0 | IL 185 west (Washington Street) to I-57 – St. Peter, Iola | |
| Clay | No major junctions | | | | |
| Effingham | Edgewood | | | To Iowa Street / I-57 | |
| Effingham | Watson | 151.0 | 243.0 | To I-57 – Effingham, Mt. Vernon | I-57 exit 151 |
| Effingham | Watson | 155.07 | 249.56 | US 45 – Effingham, Flora | |
1.000 mi = 1.609 km; 1.000 km = 0.621 mi: Concurrency terminus
