= New Columbia (disambiguation) =

New Columbia is a name proposed by the District of Columbia statehood movement since 1983.

New Columbia may also refer to:

- New Columbia (Portland, Oregon), a mixed-income housing development in the United States
- New Columbia, Illinois, an unincorporated community in the United States
- New Columbia, Pennsylvania, a census-designated place in the United States
- New Columbia, a name given to Wrangel Island by Captain Calvin L. Hooper of the Revenue cutter USRC Thomas Corwin
