= Boaz, Illinois =

- Unincorporated community
- Location within Illinois Location within the United States
- Coordinates: 37°17′30″N 88°53′59″W
- Country: United States
- State: Illinois
- County: Massac
- Elevation: 361 ft (110 m)
- Time zone: UTC-6 (Central (CST))
  - Summer (DST): UTC-5 (CDT)
- Area code: 618
- GNIS feature ID: 404636

Boaz is an unincorporated community in Massac County, Illinois, United States. Boaz is located along Illinois Route 169, 4 miles (6.4 km) east of Karnak.

Boaz obtained its name from Lynn Boaz, who had a park and picnic ground called Boaz's Park.

Boaz has two shops, a church and eighteen or twenty houses.
