= Express lanes =

The term express lanes may refer to the following different types of roadways:

- High-occupancy toll lane (including Express toll lanes)
- Local–express lanes
- Reversible lane
