= Interstate 24 =

Interstate Highway in Illinois, Kentucky, Tennessee, and Georgia

Interstate 24
- I-24 highlighted in red

Route information
- Length: 316.36 mi (509.13 km)
- Existed: August 14, 1957–present
- NHS: Entire route

Major junctions
- West end: I-57 in Pulleys Mill, IL
- I-69 from Calvert City, KY to Eddyville, KY; I-65 in Nashville, TN; I-40 in Nashville, TN; US 41 in Nashville, TN; I-59 near Wildwood, GA; US 27 / I-124 in Chattanooga, TN
- East end: I-75 / US 74 in East Ridge, TN

Location
- Country: United States
- States: Illinois; Kentucky; Tennessee; Georgia

Highway system
- Interstate Highway System; Main; Auxiliary; Suffixed; Business; Future
← IL 23	IL	→ US 24
← US 23	KY	→ US 25
← SR 23	TN	→ SR 24
← SR 23	GA	→ SR 24
← SR 408	GA SR 409	→ SR 410

Interstate 24 is a primary Interstate Highway in the Southeastern and Midwestern United States. The Interstate runs in a northwest–to–southeast alignment in the U.S. states of Illinois, Kentucky, Tennessee, and Georgia, with more than half of the highway in Tennessee. It serves the cities of Chattanooga, Murfreesboro, Nashville, and Clarksville in Tennessee, and Paducah in Kentucky. In Tennessee, I-24 is a major truck route, and many of the urban segments suffer from severe congestion. Other segments pass through mountainous terrain with hazardous curves and steep grades, including the short segment in Georgia. In Kentucky and Illinois, I-24 is predominantly a rural route.

I-24 first appeared in early plans for the Interstate system as a freeway between Chattanooga and Nashville. After the system was authorized by the Federal Aid Highway Act of 1956, an effort began to extend the route west of Nashville to improve connectivity between the Southeast and Midwest, particularly St. Louis. An agreement on the extension's route was reached in 1963, and federal authorization was given in 1964. The original route of I-24 was completed in Tennessee in 1971, and the extension was finished in Kentucky in 1980. Since its completion, I-24 has seen many projects, including the proposed I-24 Southeast Choice Lanes, which is expected to be one of the most expensive highway construction projects ever.

== Route description ==
Lengths
	mi	km
IL	38.73	62.33
KY	93.37	150.26
TN (Note: I-24 in Tennessee consists of two segments with a combined length of 180.16 miles (289.94 km) that are separated by a 4.1-mile (6.6 km) segment in Georgia.)	180.16	289.94
GA	4.10	6.60
Total	316.36	509.13

=== Illinois ===
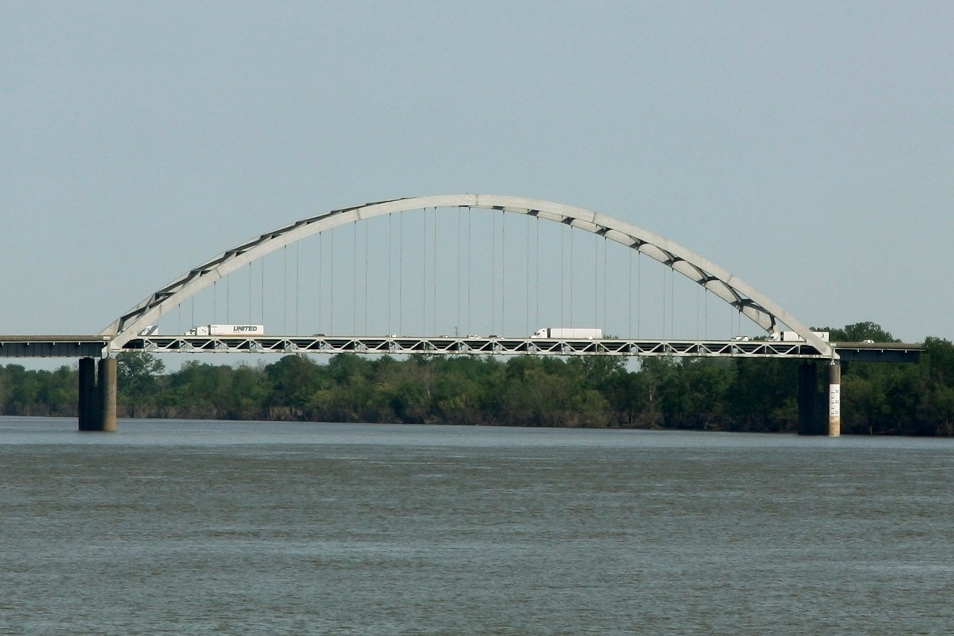
The Interstate 24 Ohio River Bridge which carries I-24 between Illinois and Kentucky.

I-24 begins at an interchange with I-57 in the rural southern part of Illinois near the community of Pulleys Mill. I-55 connects to Chicago to the north and provides access to Memphis, Tennessee, to the south by way of I-55 in Missouri. Westbound motorists on I-24 bound for St. Louis are directed to take I-57 north to I-64. Traveling southeast, the Interstate passes through mostly farmland, woodlands, and floodplains before crossing the Ohio River into Kentucky near Metropolis on the Interstate 24 Ohio River Bridge.

=== Kentucky ===
I-24 near Eddyville.

I-24 passes through the Jackson Purchase region of the western part of Kentucky. It first passes through Paducah and has interchanges with multiple U.S. Routes. It then turns into a more east–west alignment before turning slightly north. I-24 then has a concurrency with I-69, where it crosses the Tennessee and Cumberland rivers in short succession north of Land Between the Lakes National Recreation Area. Turning southeast once again, I-24 passes through more rural areas, bypassing most cities and towns and providing access to cities and towns via U.S. and state highways. Passing southwest of Hopkinsville, the Interstate provides access to this city via a spur auxiliary route, I-169. It then enters Tennessee near Fort Campbell.

=== Tennessee and Georgia ===
I-24 in southeast Nashville.

More than half of I-24's length is in Tennessee, and it is a far more important highway there than it is in the other states through which it passes. I-24 enters Tennessee in the Middle region of the state in Clarksville, the state's fifth-largest city. Bypassing most of Clarksville to the northeast, I-24 has a few major interchanges, and its traffic rapidly increases. The Interstate then passes through a rural area in the Western Highland Rim with several steep grades before reaching Nashville, the state capital and largest city. The stretch of I-24 between Clarksville and Nashville is reportedly one of the most heavily traveled highways in the United States with just two lanes in each direction, and is often criticized as outdated. Near downtown Nashville, I-24 has brief concurrencies with I-65 and I-40, and also meets the eastern terminus of I-440. I-24 then passes through southeastern Nashville and additional suburbs with several urban interchanges, the last of which is Murfreesboro, Tennessee's sixth-largest city. In Murfreesboro, I-24 has an interchange with I-840, the outer partial beltway around Nashville. The section of I-24 between downtown Nashville and Murfreesboro is widely considered the most congested stretch of highway in Tennessee, running through the most populated urban and suburban corridor in the state. This stretch features high-occupancy vehicle lanes (HOV lanes) and is where the I-24 Southeast Choice Lanes, the first express toll lanes in Tennessee, are planned.

Leaving Murfreesboro, I-24 enters a rural area in the Nashville Basin and features a mostly straight alignment. It then gradually ascends onto the Eastern Highland Rim and passes through Manchester and the Arnold Air Force Base. It then crosses over the Cumberland Plateau on a stretch known as Monteagle Mountain, where it also enters East Tennessee. Both sides of the plateau feature steep grades and sharp curves, with the western descent reaching nearly 7%, one of the steepest slopes on the Interstate Highway System. This section is particularly hazardous for truckers. I-24 then runs through a flat mountain valley before crossing the Nickajack Lake impoundment of the Tennessee River. It then meanders through a deep stream gorge in the Cumberland Plateau with several sharp curves before transitioning from Central to Eastern Time Zone and briefly dipping into Georgia. Here, it has an interchange with the northern terminus of I-59. I-24 then reemerges into Tennessee in Chattanooga, the state's fourth-largest city. Due to sharp curves combined with heavy truck traffic, I-24 through Chattanooga is often congested. The Interstate briefly runs on a narrow pass wedged between Lookout Mountain and the Tennessee River before entering downtown Chattanooga. Here, it has an interchange with US 27 and I-124, the latter of which is unsigned. I-24 has several interchanges with local roads and crosses Missionary Ridge on steep grades before reaching its eastern terminus with I-75 at the 75/24 Split interchange on the Chattanooga-East Ridge line. Here, I-75 provides access to Atlanta to the southeast and Knoxville to the northeast.

== History ==
A freeway between Nashville and Chattanooga was proposed by the federal government in the late 1930s and 1940s in plans for what became the Interstate Highway System. The route was first authorized by the Federal Aid Highway Act of 1956. Shortly thereafter, the states of Tennessee, Kentucky, Illinois, and Missouri began advocating for a western extension of I-24 to improve connectivity between the Southeastern U.S. and the Midwest, particularly St. Louis. Over the next several years, many different routes were proposed, including alignments that continued to St. Louis. The states quarreled over the extension's route for several years, but finally reached an agreement on September 17, 1963. The Bureau of Public Roads, the predecessor agency to the Federal Highway Administration, approved the extension on August 18, 1964.

The first section of I-24, located in downtown Chattanooga, opened on December 23, 1958. The last section between Nashville and Chattanooga opened on December 17, 1971, completing the original planned alignment of I-24. In Illinois, the first section opened on January 15, 1974. The first section in Kentucky, the Interstate 24 Ohio River Bridge, opened on October 18, 1974. The final segment in Illinois opened on January 24, 1976. The last segment of the extension in Tennessee opened on January 5, 1978. I-24 was completed when the last segment of the extension, located in Kentucky, opened on May 23, 1980.

Since its completion, I-24 has seen several expansions in urban areas. In the Nashville area, HOV lanes were added between 1998 and 2008. The 75/24 Split junction in Chattanooga was reconstructed in multiple phases between 2019 and 2026. A special project in Nashville called I-24 MOTION includes specialized cameras that traffic engineers and researchers use to study traffic congestion patterns. The I-24 Southeast Choice Lanes, first authorized in 2023, are planned for construction on I-24 between downtown Nashville and Murfreesboro as Tennessee's first express toll lanes. At $9.2 billion, the project is expected to be one of the most expensive roadway infrastructure projects in history.

== Major intersections ==
Illinois
US 45 near Vienna
US 45 in Metropolis

Kentucky
US 60 / I-24 BL in Paducah
US 45 / US 62 in Paducah
US 68 in Paducah
I-69 in Calvert City
US 62 / US 641 in Kuttawa
I-69 / Western Kentucky Parkway in Eddyville
US 68 in Cadiz
I-169 near Hopkinsville
US 41 Alt. on the Oak Grove–Hopkinsville line

Tennessee and Georgia
US 79 in Clarksville, Tennessee
US 431 in Joelton, Tennessee
SR 155 in Nashville, Tennessee
I-65 in Nashville
US 431 in Nashville
US 31E in Nashville
US 41 (James Robertson Parkway) in Nashville
I-40 in Nashville
I-440 in Nashville
US 41 / US 70S in Nashville
SR 155 in Nashville
I-840 in Murfreesboro, Tennessee
US 41 in Manchester, Tennessee
US 64 in Pelham, Tennessee
US 41A in Monteagle, Tennessee
US 64 / US 72 in Kimball, Tennessee
I-59 near Wildwood, Georgia
US 41 / US 64 in Chattanooga, Tennessee
US 27 / I-124 in Chattanooga
US 11 / US 41 / US 64 in Chattanooga
US 41 / US 76 on the Chattanooga–East Ridge line

== Auxiliary and business routes ==
- I-24 BL in Paducah, Kentucky
- I-124 (unsigned) in Chattanooga, Tennessee
