= Choice Lanes =

Planned system of express toll lanes in Tennessee, United States

- Industry: Express toll lanes, electronic toll collection
- Founded: April 17, 2023; 3 years ago
- Headquarters: Nashville, Tennessee
- Area served: Tennessee (with interoperability in additional states)
- Owner: Tennessee Department of Transportation
- Website: www.tn.gov/tdot/build-with-us/choice-lanes.html

Choice Lanes are a planned system of express toll lanes on Interstate Highways in urban areas in the U.S. state of Tennessee. The lanes are planned to be financed, built, and maintained by private-sector firms through public–private partnerships (P3s) with the Tennessee Department of Transportation (TDOT), which will retain ownership of the facilities. Choice Lanes were authorized by the Tennessee General Assembly in 2023, and the first facility is planned to be constructed on Interstate 24 (I-24) between Nashville and Murfreesboro. Additional potential express lane facilities have been studied in the Nashville, Knoxville, and Chattanooga areas.

== Overview ==
TDOT's Choice Lanes will be designed, built, financed, operated, and maintained by private-sector firms through public–private partnerships (P3s). Like toll lane facilities in other states, Choice Lanes will use dynamic pricing based on demand. Unlike facilities in other states, certain passenger counts will not be required to use the lanes or exempt users from the tolls. Emergency vehicles, transit buses, and school buses will be allowed to use the lanes for free. TDOT is also not allowed to levy tolls on existing general-purpose lanes or remove existing general-purpose lanes for toll facilities, unlike other states. The lanes will use open road tolling, and be compatible with EZ-Pass and other states' toll collection systems, although the exact method of collection for Tennessee residents has yet to be determined.

Choice Lanes in Tennessee are overseen by the Transportation Modernization Board (TMB), which approves the planning, development, operation, and construction of Choice Lanes projects. The board is composed of five members: an appointee by the Governor, Speaker of the House, and Speaker of the Senate, respectively; a designee by the Governor; and the commissioner of TDOT, who is an ex officio member. This organization was established by the Transportation Modernization Act (TMA) in 2023, which authorized Choice Lanes projects. The Tennessee Strategic Transportation Accountability Council (STAC), established on August 19, 2026, by an executive order of Governor Bill Lee, was created to provide oversight of P3 revenues and advise state leaders on these revenues can be used.

== Background ==
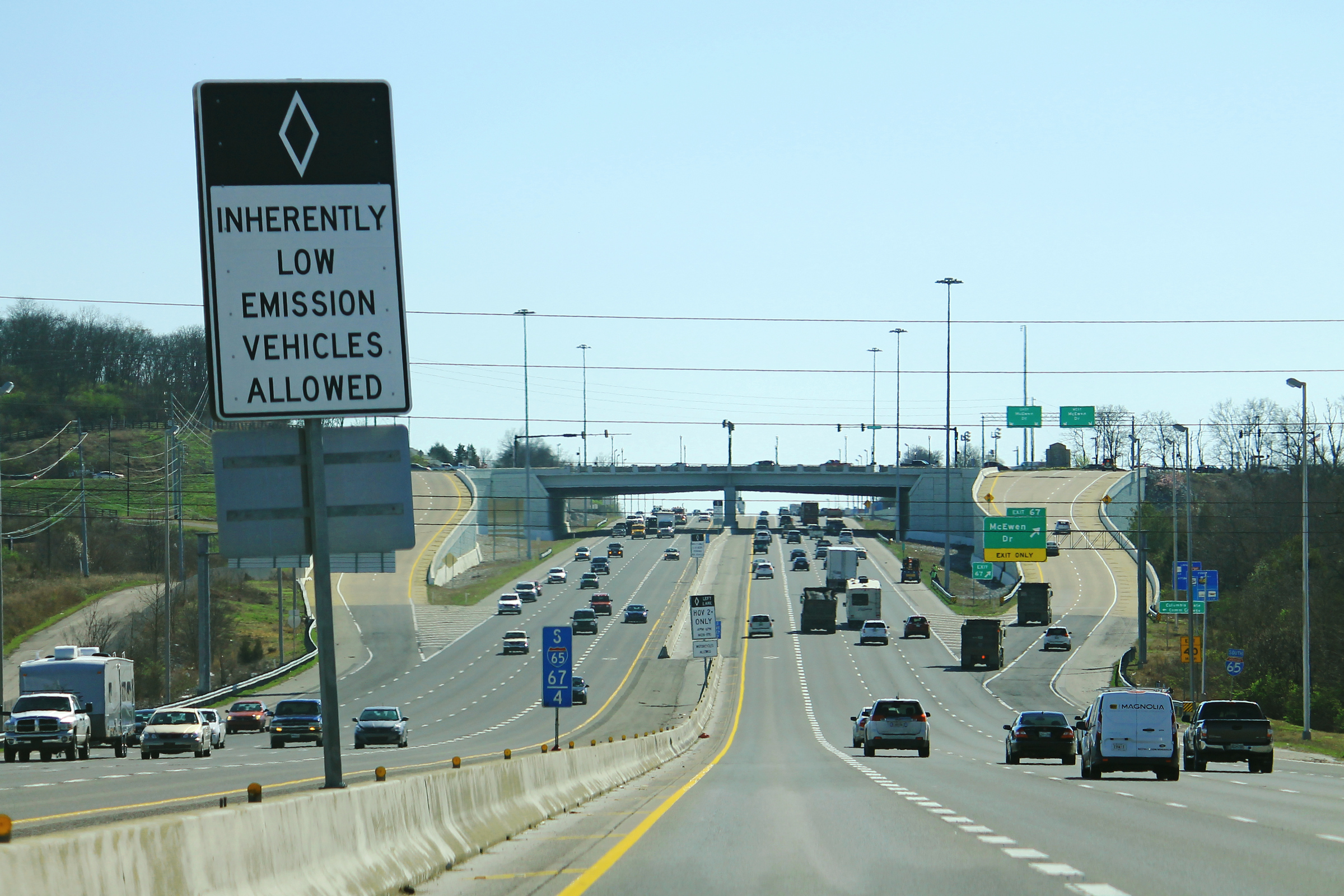
Tennessee has used high-occupancy vehicle lanes (HOV lanes), such as this one on I-65 in Franklin, since 1993.

For many decades, Tennessee has struggled with urban congestion on its Interstate Highways and other major urban thoroughfares. The state's population has been rapidly growing for a long time, and its central location relative to the country's center of population exacerbates the problem, particularly regarding trucks and tourist traffic. Since 1993, TDOT has used high occupancy vehicle lanes (HOV lanes) in the Nashville and Memphis metropolitan areas to combat congestion. By 2017, Tennessee's HOV lane network had grown to become the sixth-largest in the country. However, the state continued to grow rapidly, particularly in Middle Tennessee, with the Nashville and Clarksville metropolitan areas ranked among the fastest growing in the country. In 2018, Nashville voters rejected Let's Move Nashville an $8.9 billion multi-year initiative to expand bus service and bus rapid transit (BRT) and build a light rail system. Six years later, Nashville voters approved Choose How You Move, which includes options for expanding BRT, but is much less ambitious than the previous initiative, costing $3.1 billion.

Despite earlier attempts to mitigate congestion on highways, the problem persisted, and by the late 2010s, Tennessee consistently ranked as one of the states with the highest number of congestion bottlenecks for trucks in the country. A few interchanges, including the exchange between I-24, I-40, and I-440 in Nashville; and the 75/24 Split in Chattanooga, ranked in the top 10 worst bottlenecks in the country some years; most other congestion hotspots of similar severity are in much larger metropolitan areas. In addition, TDOT is one of the few state transportation agencies that does not incur debt to fund transportation. While supporters laud this practice as fiscal responsibility, critics argue that it stymies their ability to fund necessary transportation improvements and causes projects to take longer than most other states. Tennessee also has lower fuel taxes and less state sources of transportation revenue than most states. Before 2023, Tennessee was one of four states where all state transportation revenue came from fuel taxes, vehicle registration fees, and other highway user fees alone. Declining federal fuel tax revenues and rapid inflation of the cost of construction materials have also exacerbated the problem in Tennessee and all other states.

Unlike many states, Tennessee has never had toll roads, bridges, or lanes since the advent of the automobile. Several toll roads called turnpikes were built in Tennessee in the late 18th and 19th centuries. An 1899 state law authorized counties to purchase turnpikes, and the Federal Aid Road Act of 1916 further led to state and local acquisition of these roads. The last toll road in Tennessee, the Nashville to Franklin Turnpike (present-day U.S. Route 31), was freed in 1926. Proposals to toll existing roads or construct new toll roads have been met with virulent backlash, leading to their cancellation or indefinite tabling. In 2007, the Tennessee Tollway Act authorized TDOT to study tolling as an alternative to traditional project delivery and to identify candidates for pilot toll projects. Four road and bridge projects were studied, and a report was issued on January 1, 2009, but none met the criteria for such facilities as required in the legislation. TDOT conducted a research study in collaboration with Vanderbilt University and Tennessee State University on converting HOV lanes in Nashville to high-occupancy toll lanes (HOT lanes) between September 1, 2020, and August 31, 2022. In November 2022, TDOT officials announced that they were studying new express toll lane facilities for urban Interstates, which they started calling "Choice Lanes". However, state law did not allow such facilities at the time, and they began lobbying state lawmakers to change the laws. Choice Lanes were authorized by the Transportation Modernization Act, passed by the Tennessee General Assembly and signed into law by Governor Bill Lee on April 17, 2023. This law also set up the Transportation Modernization Board to oversee the planning, construction, and maintenance of these toll lanes, appropriated the first funding for feasibility studies and preliminary engineering, and prohibits TDOT from tolling existing roads. It also expanded alternative delivery methods and appropriated transportation revenues from the state's general fund for the first time.

== Interstate 24 Southeast Choice Lanes ==
Official logo of the I-24 Southeast Choice Lanes

On December 18, 2023, TDOT announced that its first express toll lanes would be constructed on I-24 between downtown Nashville in Davidson County and Murfreesboro in Rutherford County as part of its 10-year plan. This was chosen for the first Choice Lanes project because of its status as the most populous urban and suburban corridor in Tennessee and chronic congestion that is typically more prolonged throughout the day than other corridors. In addition to the four general-purpose lanes in each direction, two express lanes are planned to be constructed in each direction between the western end of the I-24/I-40 on the southeast of downtown Nashville and a short distance above I-840 northeast of Murfreesboro. These lanes will also pass through the Antioch neighborhood and the Nashville suburbs of La Vergne and Smyrna. The main toll lanes on I-24 will also be complemented by branching toll lanes extending onto I-40 east of the eastern split with I-24, the eastern terminus of I-440, and State Route 155 (SR 155/Briley Parkway). A total of 26 miles (42 km) of toll lanes are planned to be built in this project. The project will require most bridges on this corridor to be replaced, making it one of the most complex infrastructure projects ever undertaken. The existing HOV restrictions on the leftmost general-purpose lanes are planned to remain in place.

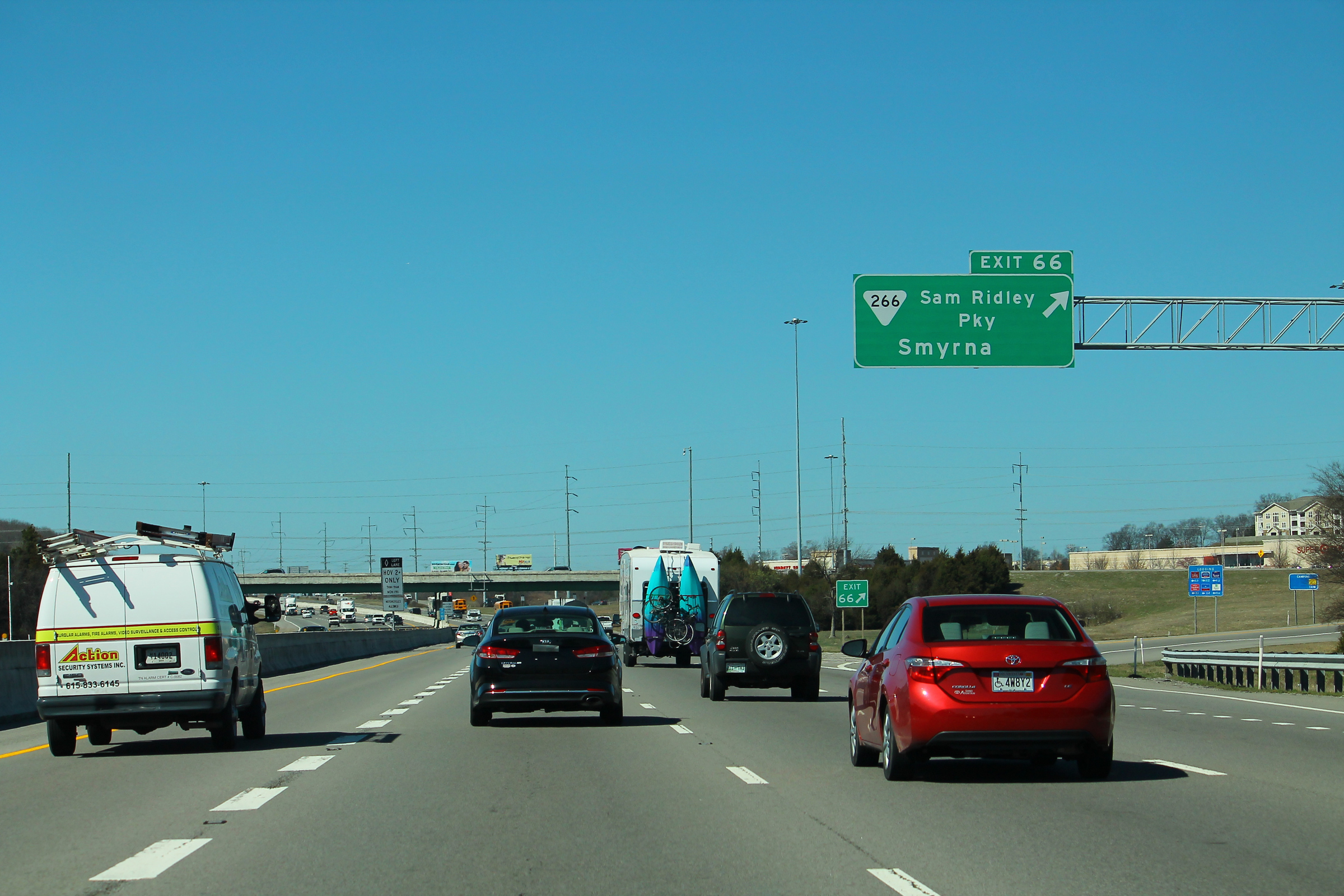
I-24 westbound in Smyrna. This corridor was chosen for the first Choice Lanes project because of its consistent, prolonged congestion relative to other corridors.

The I-24/40/440 exchange was improved to reduce weaving movements in the mid-1990s, and the 20-mile (32 km) segment of I-24 from this interchange to I-840 was widened to eight lanes, including variable rush-hour HOV lanes, from 1997 to 2002. Nevertheless, Rutherford County's population nearly doubled between 2000 and 2020, and traffic volumes between Nashville and Murfreesboro increased 60% from 2005 to 2018. Between 2018 and 2023, TDOT created the I-24 Smart Corridor on this section to manage congestion. This included installing additional dynamic message signs and lane control signs, implementing variable speed limits, new designated emergency pull-offs, and ramp improvements. In conjunction with this project, TDOT also instituted a project researching causes of traffic congestion called I-24 MOTION, in collaboration with several universities and government agencies, along six miles (9.7 km) of this stretch in 2022. Problems persisted, and traditional widening was ruled out as being too costly and unlikely to work. By 2026, this stretch of I-24 was carrying between 150,000–180,000 vehicles per day, including more than 25,000 trucks in some places. Public hearings for the Choice Lanes began in August 2024, and additional hearings were held between September and October 2025 to present revised information. The environmental assessment for the project was approved by the Federal Highway Administration (FHWA) on January 30, 2026, and a Finding of No Significant Impact was approved by the FHWA on June 16, 2026. The FHWA published a notice of final approval on August 17, 2026.

Initial estimates placed the project at $4.5 billion, and four conglomerates submitted proposals. Unlike most highway contracts, selection was not based on the lowest bid; rather, TDOT and the TMB based their decision on what they considered the best-value proposal. On August 19, 2026, the TMB approved a partnership with DriveTN, a conglomerate of multiple companies, to finance, build, and operate the toll lanes over a period of 50 years. Construction is expected to cost $9.2 billion, making it one of the most expensive individual highway projects in the country's history. In addition, the company is projected to provide $24.8 billion in concession payments over the 50-year timeframe, and was also given the right of first refusal for future Choice Lanes projects. TDOT reached commercial close with DriveTN on September 30, 2026. Construction is expected to begin in 2027 and take approximately eight years, although some sections are projected to open sooner.

== Other projects ==
TDOT has planned to expand its network of toll lanes from the start. When they released their 10-year plan and announced the I-24 Southeast Choice Lanes, they also announced that they had studied the feasibility of Choice Lanes on three other corridors. These are I-40/I-75 between the I-40/75 split near Lenoir City and SR 158 in Downtown Knoxville, I-24 in Chattanooga between the Georgia state line and I-75, and I-65 between I-40 in Downtown Nashville and SR 396 in Spring Hill. The I-40/I-75 West Knoxville Corridor Study, initiated in early 2024; and the I-65 Planning and Environmental Linkages (PEL) study, initiated in July 2026, are also further analyzing the feasibility of toll lanes on these corridors. When TDOT announced the award for the I-24 project, they also stated that they were exploring Choice Lanes in three more locations that would connect to these lanes: an extension along I-40 to the Nashville International Airport, I-24 east of downtown Nashville extending north from I-40 onto the I-24/65 concurrency, and a southeast extension along I-24 and I-840 into Murfreesboro.

== See also ==
- Tennessee Department of Transportation
- High-occupancy toll lane
- Toll roads in the United States
- Bus rapid transit
- High-occupancy vehicle lane
