= Shady Grove, Illinois =

- Unincorporated community
- Location within Illinois Location within the United States
- Coordinates: 37°07′26″N 88°33′57″W
- Country: United States
- State: Illinois
- County: Massac
- Elevation: 344 ft (105 m)
- Time zone: UTC-6 (Central (CST))
  - Summer (DST): UTC-5 (CDT)
- Area code: 618
- GNIS feature ID: 418256

Shady Grove is an unincorporated community in Massac County, Illinois, United States. Shady Grove is 3.5 miles (5.6 km) east of Brookport.
