= High-occupancy toll lane =

Traffic lane or roadway on which high-occupancy vehicles are exempt from tolls

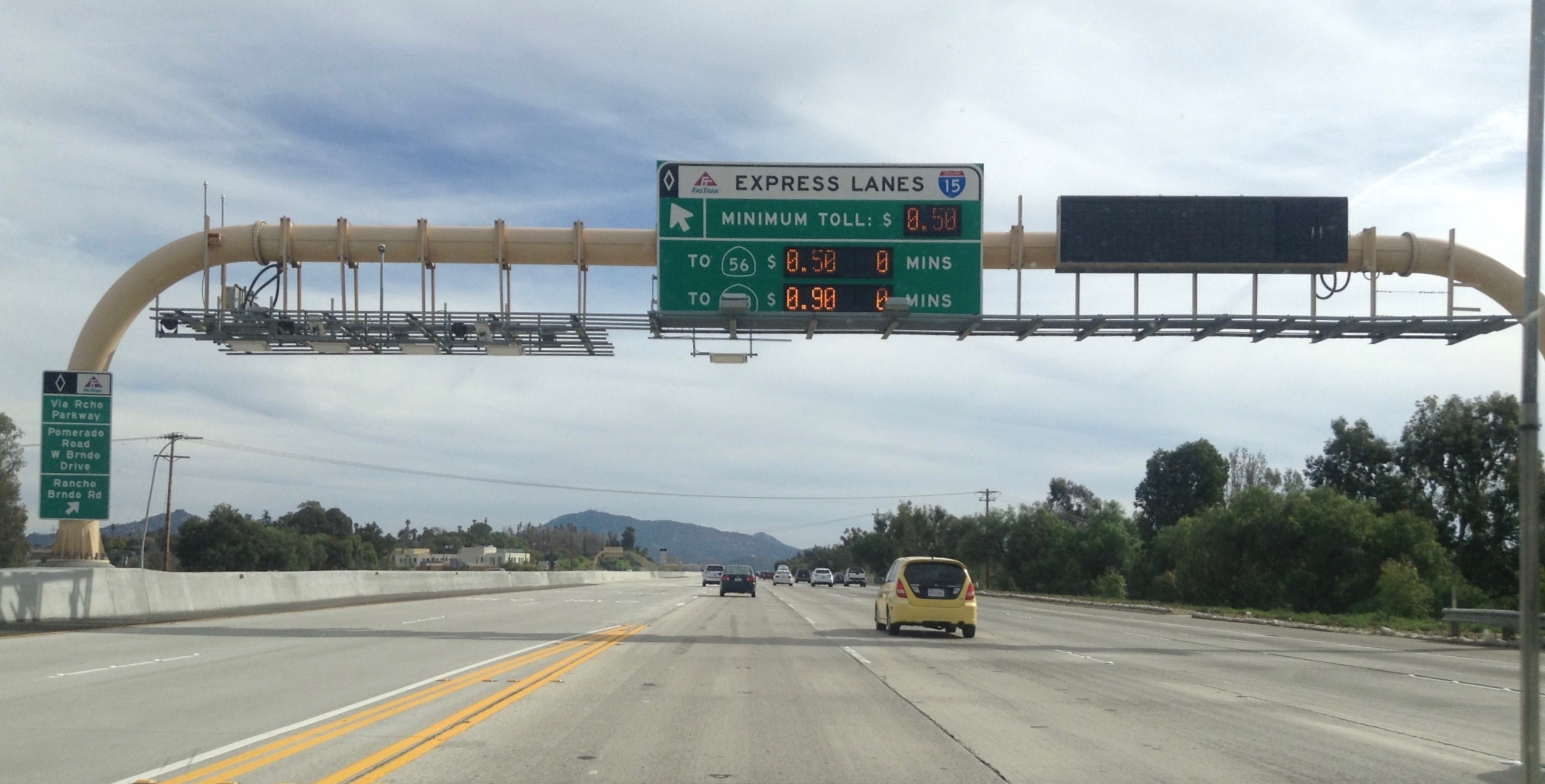
FasTrak high-occupancy toll (HOT) lanes along Interstate 15 southbound in Escondido, California, displaying the variable fee.

A high-occupancy toll lane (HOT lane) is a type of traffic lane or roadway that is available to high-occupancy vehicles and other exempt vehicles without charge; other vehicles are required to pay a variable fee that is adjusted in response to demand. Unlike toll roads, drivers have an option to use general purpose lanes, on which a fee is not charged. Express toll lanes, which are less common, operate along similar lines, but do not exempt high-occupancy vehicles.

== History ==
The HOT concept developed from high-occupancy vehicle lane (HOV) systems in order to increase use of the available capacity, as it was found that HOV lanes were underutilized compared to general purpose lanes.

Most implementations are currently in the United States. The first practical implementation was California's formerly private toll 91 Express Lanes, in Orange County, California, in 1995, followed in 1996 by Interstate 15 in northern San Diego. According to the Texas A&M Transportation Institute, as of 2012 there were 294 corridor-miles of HOT/Express lanes in operation in the United States and 163 corridor-miles under construction.

The first HOT lane implementation in Canada was along the Queen Elizabeth Way (QEW) freeway in Ontario. Existing high-occupancy vehicle lanes were redesignated as HOT lanes for a 16.5-kilometre (10.3 mi) stretch of the QEW between Oakville and Burlington. The initial system consisted of $180 permits valid for three months, though HOT lanes with electronic tolling infrastructure were announced as part of forthcoming expansions to Ontario Highway 427.

== Design ==
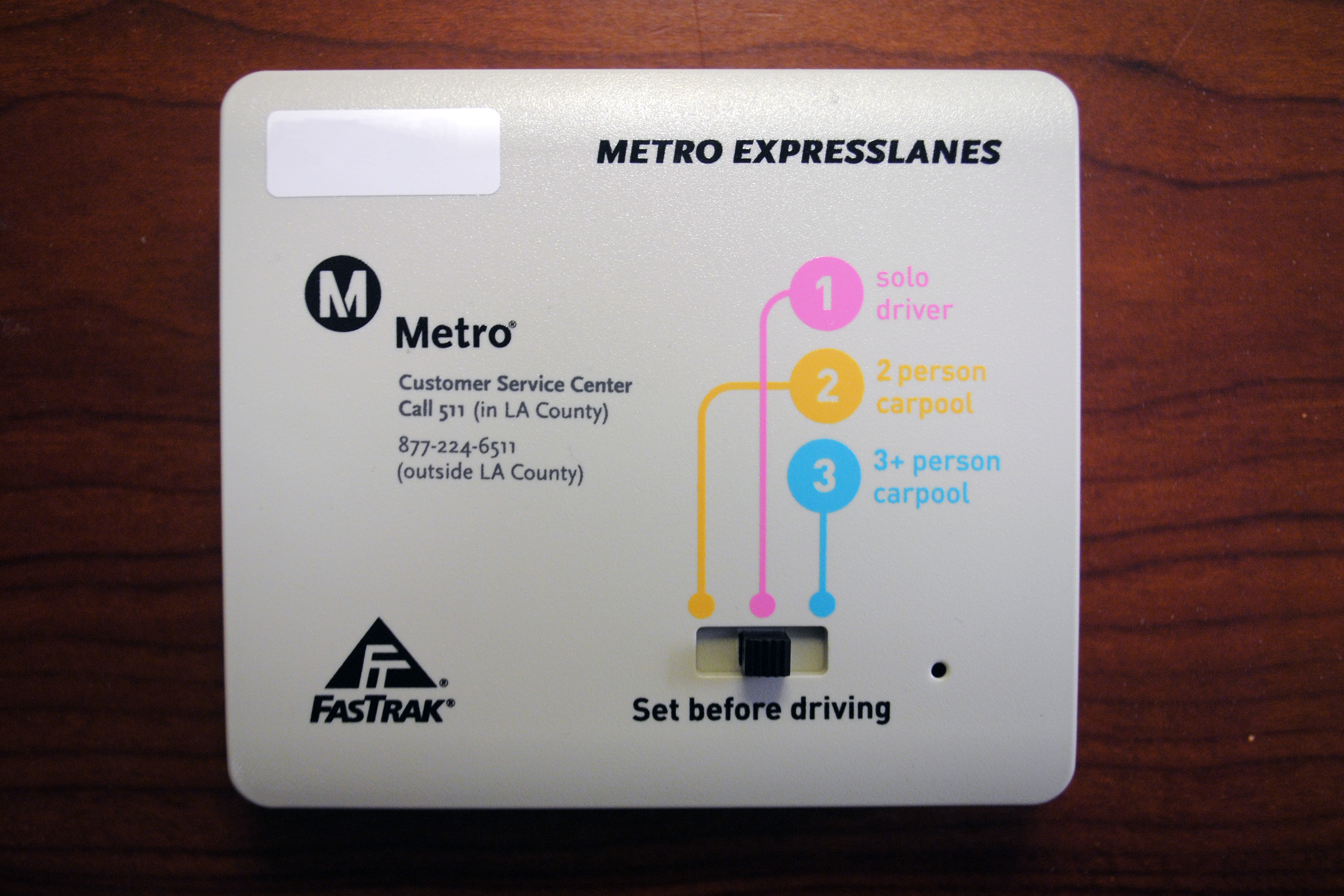
An in-vehicle, switchable FasTrak Flex transponder fitted to the dashboard of vehicles for use in Greater Los Angeles, CA, US

Some systems are reversible, operating in one direction during the morning commute and in the reverse direction during the evening commute. The toll is typically collected using electronic toll collection systems, automatic number plate recognition, or at staffed toll booths. Exempt vehicles typically include those with at least two, three or four occupants, those that use approved alternative fuels, motorcycles, transit vehicles and emergency vehicles.

The fee, which is displayed prominently at entry points to the lanes, is adjusted in response to demand to regulate the traffic volume and thereby provided a guaranteed minimum traffic speed and level of service.

The Los Angeles Metro ExpressLanes HOT system requires vehicles to be fitted with manually "switchable" transponders where the driver selects the number of occupants, based on which the appropriate fee is charged. California Highway Patrol officers have in-vehicle devices which display the declared occupancy of a vehicle, which they can verify visually and cite any driver(s) with fewer occupants than declared (and tolled for). The new system proved itself to be highly effective in reducing the rate of lane-use violations, with it falling to 40-50% of the violation rates of other comparable California highways, from more than 20-25% (nearly one out of four or five) to just 10% (one in ten). Other transportation officials in California took note of this, subsequently leading to the Bay Area officials of Alameda County to adopt a similar system for the (then) planned Interstate 580.

== Funding and construction ==
Implementation of these systems can be prohibitively expensive, due to the initial construction required—particularly with regard to providing access to and from the express toll lanes at interchanges. However, the long-term benefits—the decrease in delay to able motorists and increased funding for the transportation agency—may outweigh the costs. To offset costs of construction, many transportation agencies lease public roads to a private institution. As a result, construction may be partially or fully funded by the private institution, which receives all of the income from tolling for a specified period.

== Criticism ==
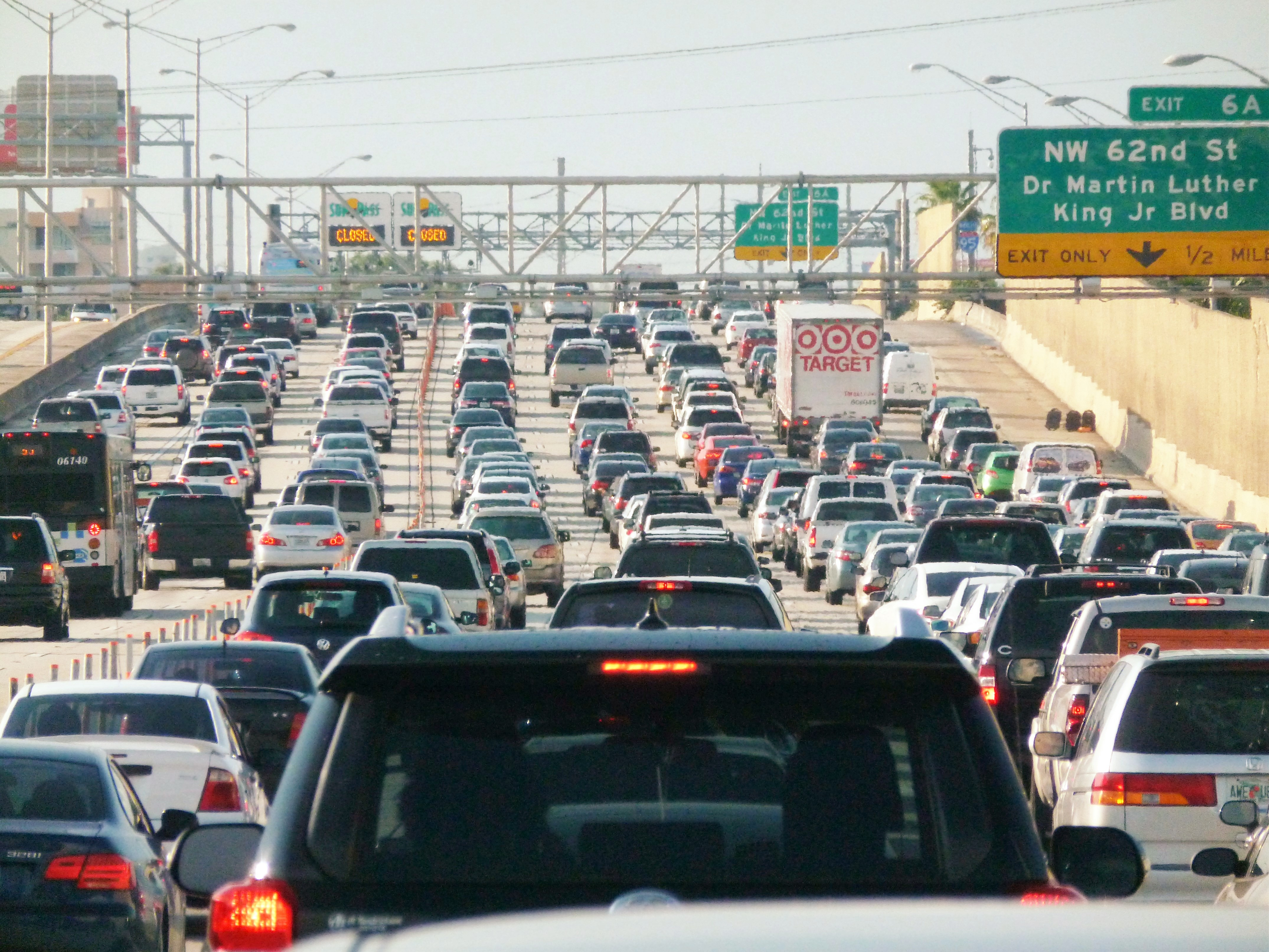
Afternoon rush hour in Miami, where tolled express lanes have become congested and "closed"

Because HOT lanes and ETLs are often constructed within the existing road space, they are criticized as being an environmental tax or "Lexus lanes" solely beneficial to higher-income individuals, since one toll rate is charged regardless of socioeconomic status and the working poor thus suffer greater financial burden, although some states offer tax deductions or rebates to low income individuals for toll payments. Supporters of HOT lanes counter with the fact that because HOT lanes encourage the use of public transit and ride sharing, they reduce transportation demands and provide a benefit for all. However, HOT lanes have demonstrated no guarantees in eliminating traffic congestion, bringing into question their fundamental usefulness aside from raising funds for private institutions and local governments.

According to Karel Martens' Transport Justice, widening or expanding roads paid by taxes imposed on all motorists is unjust since. According to Martens, High-occupancy toll lanes offer a way to tackle traffic jams by the lanes' real time users, who can thus finance the construction and maintenance of lanes. Martens argues that those who are willing to pay more can thus enjoy faster accessibility.

== Examples ==
=== High Occupancy Toll Lanes (HOT lanes) ===
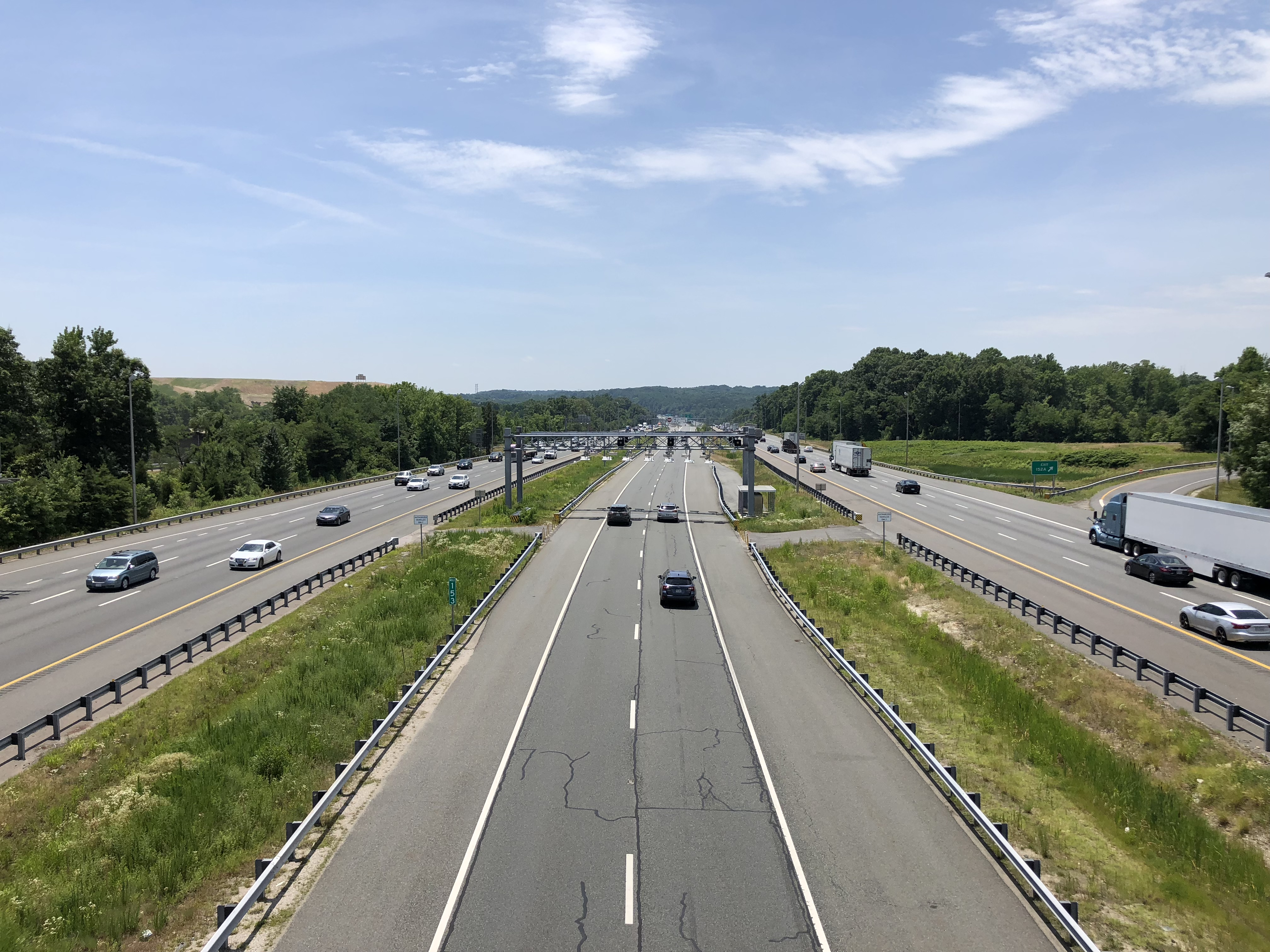
Reversible HOT lanes along Interstate 95 in Northern Virginia

- Metro ExpressLanes in California
- Virginia HOT lanes
- Interstate 405 (Washington)
- Washington State Route 167
- California State Route 237 from Mathilda Avenue to Interstate 880
- Interstate 15 in California, various locations
- Interstate 580 in California approaching Altamont Pass
- Interstate 680 in California, various locations
- Interstate 77 in North Carolina near downtown Charlotte
- 91 Express Lanes in California
- Interstate 405 (California)
- U.S. Route 101 in California, various locations
- Interstate 880 (California)
- Interstate 10 in San Bernardino County, California

=== Express Toll Lanes (Express lanes) ===
- Northwest Corridor Express Lanes (Interstate 75 (I-75) and I-575) in Georgia. (No vehicles including HOV 3+ are exempt from the toll.)
- South Metro Express Lanes (I-75 and I-675) in Georgia. (No vehicles, including HOV 3+, are exempt from the toll.)
- North Tarrant Express in Fort Worth, Texas. Includes I-35W, I-820, State Highway 183 (SH 183), and SH 121 (During rush hour, vehicles including HOV 2+ are given a 50% discount.)
- Interstate 10 Katy Tollway in Houston (All exemptions, including HOV 2+, are only in effect during rush hour periods.)
- Interstate 95 Between the I-895 merge and MD 43 (northbound and southbound) and MD 152 in Joppa (northbound only, to be extended to MD 24 by late 2027)
- Interstate 4 in Orlando, Florida, between mile markers 75 and 95 (Transit buses, school buses, and vanpools can have tolls waived with registration)
- Interstate 95 between I-395 and SR 842 (HOV 3+ vehicles, as well as vanpools, can be exempted from tolls with registration.)
- Interstate 25 between US 36 and E-470 (HOV of 3+ with an ExpressToll transmitter is free)
- Choice Lanes, a planned network of express toll lanes in Tennessee. The first facility is planned to be built on I-24 between Nashville and Murfreesboro, and additional facilities are proposed.

== See also ==
- Road space rationing
- Transportation demand management
- List of toll roads in the United States
- Feebate
