= Zeigler, Illinois =

- City
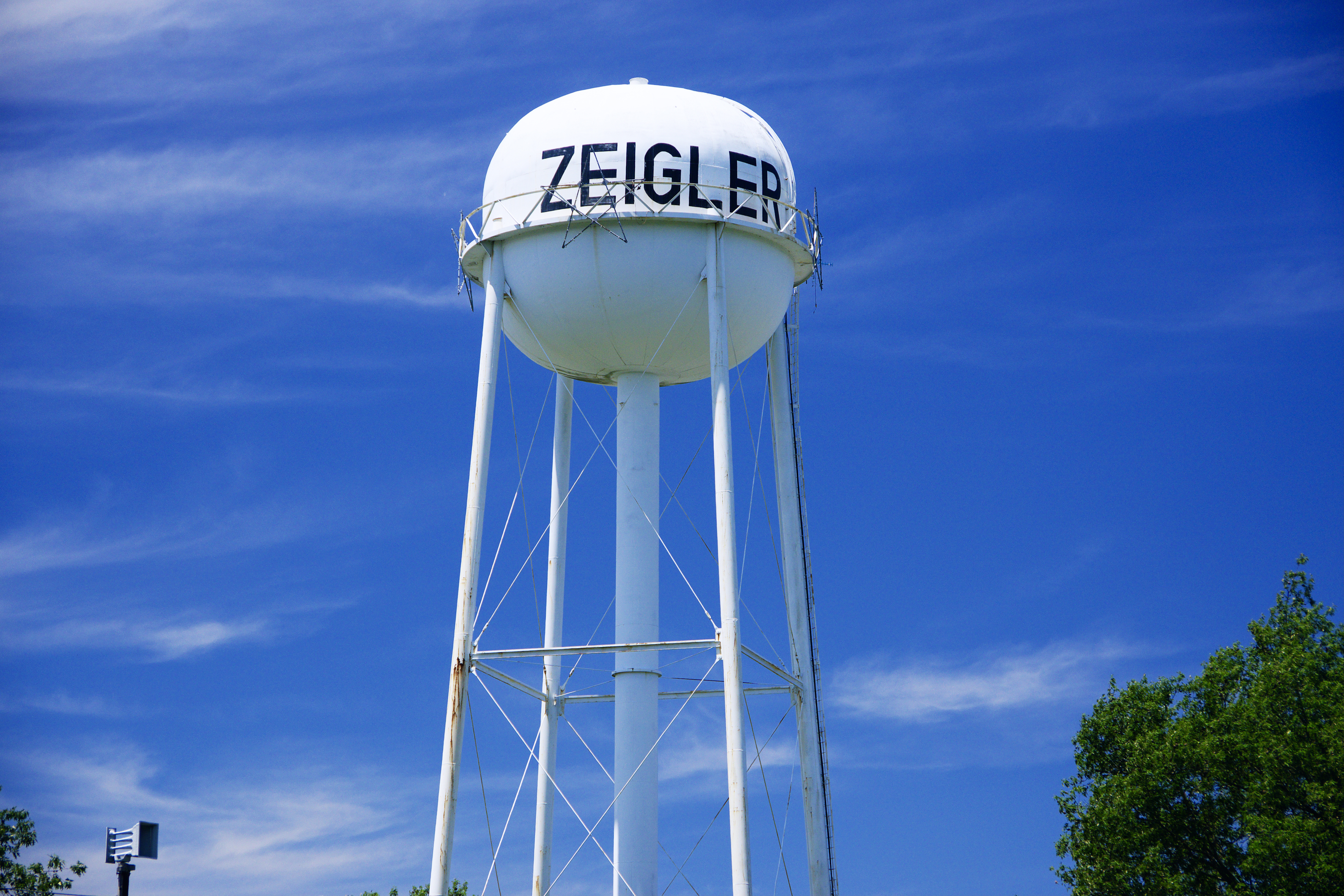
- Water tower

- Location of Zeigler in Franklin County, Illinois.
- Coordinates: 37°54′24″N 89°03′08″W
- Country: United States
- State: Illinois
- County: Franklin

Area
  - Total: 1.37 sq mi (3.54 km^{2})
  - Land: 1.36 sq mi (3.52 km^{2})
  - Water: 0.0077 sq mi (0.02 km^{2})
- Elevation: 407 ft (124 m)

Population (2020)
  - Total: 1,484
  - Density: 1,092.1/sq mi (421.68/km^{2})
- Time zone: UTC-6 (CST)
  - Summer (DST): UTC-5 (CDT)
- ZIP code: 62999
- Area code: 618
- FIPS code: 17-84155
- GNIS feature ID: 2397398

Zeigler is a city in Franklin County, Illinois, United States. The population was 1,484 at the 2020 census.

== History ==
In 1905, fifty men were killed in a coal mining accident in or near the town.

Zeigler incorporated in 1914 and was named for Levi Zeigler Leiter, the father of Joseph Leiter, the founder of the Zeigler Coal Company.

== Geography ==
Zeigler is located in southwestern Franklin County. Illinois Route 149 passes through the center of town, leading east 7.5 miles (12.1 km) to West Frankfort and west 4 miles (6 km) to Royalton. Interstate 57 is 6 miles (10 km) east of Zeigler via Route 149. Illinois Route 148 follows the western border of Zeigler, leading north 5 miles (8 km) to Christopher and south 7 miles (11 km) to Herrin. The city is laid out in the shape of a wagon wheel, with the post office, library, and several shops concentrated around a circular park at the center, and streets radiating out from the center.

According to the 2021 census gazetteer files, Zeigler has a total area of 1.37 square miles (3.55 km^{2}), of which 1.36 square miles (3.52 km^{2}) (or 99.49%) is land and 0.01 square miles (0.03 km^{2}) (or 0.51%) is water.

== Demographics ==
Historical population
Census	Pop.	Note	%±
1920	2,338		—
1930	3,816		63.2%
1940	3,006		−21.2%
1950	2,516		−16.3%
1960	2,133		−15.2%
1970	1,940		−9.0%
1980	1,858		−4.2%
1990	1,746		−6.0%
2000	1,669		−4.4%
2010	1,801		7.9%
2020	1,484		−17.6%
U.S. Decennial Census

=== 2020 census ===
As of the 2020 census, Zeigler had a population of 1,484. The median age was 42.3 years. 21.0% of residents were under the age of 18 and 20.4% of residents were 65 years of age or older. For every 100 females there were 98.9 males, and for every 100 females age 18 and over there were 98.1 males age 18 and over.

The population density was 1,086.38 inhabitants per square mile (419.45/km^{2}).

0.0% of residents lived in urban areas, while 100.0% lived in rural areas.

There were 636 households in Zeigler, of which 28.9% had children under the age of 18 living in them. Of all households, 39.5% were married-couple households, 22.0% were households with a male householder and no spouse or partner present, and 30.2% were households with a female householder and no spouse or partner present. About 32.8% of all households were made up of individuals and 16.6% had someone living alone who was 65 years of age or older.

There were 743 housing units at an average density of 543.92 per square mile (210.01/km^{2}). Of those units, 14.4% were vacant. The homeowner vacancy rate was 4.0% and the rental vacancy rate was 7.0%.

Racial composition as of the 2020 census
Race	Number	Percent
White	1,395	94.0%
Black or African American	5	0.3%
American Indian and Alaska Native	5	0.3%
Asian	6	0.4%
Native Hawaiian and Other Pacific Islander	0	0.0%
Some other race	10	0.7%
Two or more races	63	4.2%
Hispanic or Latino (of any race)	21	1.4%

=== Income and poverty ===
The median income for a household in the city was $44,342, and the median income for a family was $51,563. Males had a median income of $30,598 versus $20,793 for females. The per capita income for the city was $17,721. About 15.0% of families and 20.8% of the population were below the poverty line, including 24.3% of those under age 18 and 14.8% of those age 65 or over.

== Notable people ==
- Nick Holonyak, invented the first practically useful visible LED in 1962; born in Zeigler
- Babe Martin, outfielder and catcher for the St. Louis Browns and Boston Red Sox; grew up in Zeigler
- Mike Milosevich, shortstop for the New York Yankees; born in Zeigler
