= New Columbia, Illinois =

- Unincorporated community
- Location within Illinois Location within the United States
- Coordinates: 37°18′38″N 88°46′31″W
- Country: United States
- State: Illinois
- County: Massac
- Elevation: 528 ft (161 m)
- Time zone: UTC-6 (Central (CST))
  - Summer (DST): UTC-5 (CDT)
- Area code: 618
- GNIS feature ID: 414389

New Columbia is an unincorporated community in Massac County, Illinois, United States. New Columbia is 10 miles (16 km) southeast of Vienna.
