= 75/24 Split =

Highway interchange in Chattanooga, Tennessee, United States

- Interactive map of 75/24 Split

Location
- Chattanooga, Tennessee
- Coordinates: 35°00′16″N 85°12′48″W
- Roads at junction: I-24; I-75

Construction
- Type: Semi-directional T interchange
- Constructed: 1959-1961
- Opened: May 31, 1961 (partial); December 7, 1962 (full)
- Maintained by: Tennessee Department of Transportation

The 75/24 Split (pronounced "seventy-five twenty-four split"), also commonly known simply as "The Split", is the name given to the interchange between Interstate 75 and the eastern terminus of Interstate 24 in Chattanooga, Tennessee. The interchange was originally constructed between 1959 and 1961 as a simple directional-T interchange. Although Chattanooga is only a mid-sized city by national standards, the interchange is the convergence point of two major north-south freight corridors, running between Atlanta and Detroit, and Atlanta and Chicago, respectively. As a result, the interchange has been ranked as one of the most congested bottlenecks in the country, rendering its original design obsolete, and has become notorious for congestion and accidents. The interchange was extensively reconstructed between 2019 and 2026.

== Overview ==
=== Description ===
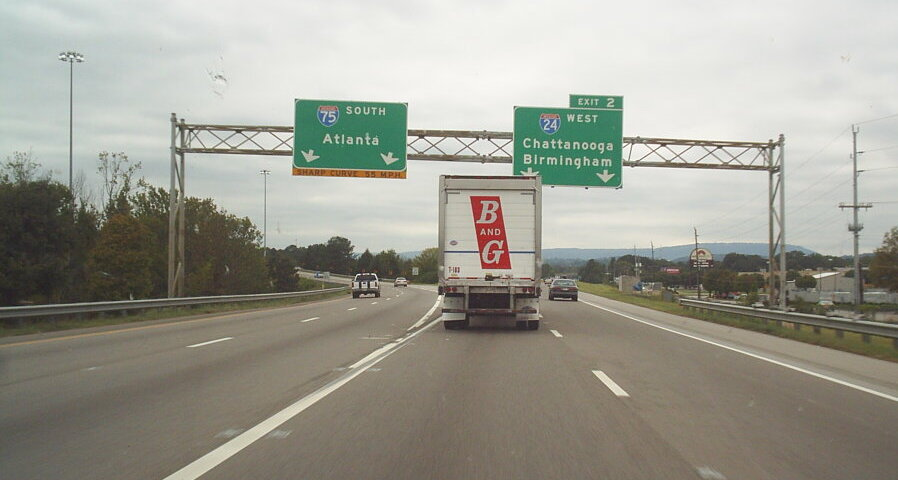
The approach to the Split on I-75 southbound in 2005, prior to reconstruction.

The interchange is located along the border between the southeastern part of Chattanooga and East Ridge, a suburb of the former, approximately one mile (1.6 km) north of the Georgia state line. It serves as the eastern terminus of I-24 at I-75. It is exit 2 on I-75 and exits 185 A and B on I-24. It is located directly south of Eastgate Towne Center and west of Camp Jordan, a large multi-use park operated by the city of East Ridge. The area to the west of the interchange comprises mostly residential neighborhoods. The interchange is also located less than one mile (1.6 km) south of the Chattanooga Metropolitan Airport. I-75 crosses West Chickamauga Creek directly south of the interchange and South Chickamauga Creek east of it; the two creeks converge along the boundary of Camp Jordan.

The interchange is a semi-directional T configuration, with I-75 shifting from a northwest-to-southeast alignment toward Atlanta to a northeast-to-southwest alignment toward Knoxville. I-24 continues in an east-west alignment past the interchange, first toward Downtown Chattanooga, and ultimately northwest to Nashville. I-75 carries three lanes in each direction through the interchange, with both ramps coming from I-24 also carrying three lanes. The ramp from I-75 southbound to I-24 westbound has two lanes, and the ramp from I-75 northbound to I-24 westbound bottlenecks from two to one lane; both of these ramps will be expanded to three lanes once the second phase of reconstruction is complete. A barrier-separated collector-distributor slip ramp along I-75 northbound also provides direct access to I-75 northbound and I-24 westbound from US 41 and the Tennessee Welcome Center directly to the south in order to reduce weaving. On northbound I-75, the interchange is signed as I-24 westbound to Chattanooga and Nashville, while from southbound I-75, it is signed for I-24 to I-59 to Chattanooga and Birmingham, Alabama.

=== Traffic and congestion ===
The Split serves as the convergence point of two major freight corridors that run between Atlanta and Detroit and Atlanta and Chicago, respectively. For this reason, the interchange and much of I-24 through Chattanooga receives an extremely high volume of through truck traffic, which results in the city experiencing unusually severe traffic congestion for its size. A 2015 study by Cambridge Systematics found that 80 percent of the trucks that pass through Chattanooga are destined for a different location, the highest share of any metropolitan area in the country, and identified the Split as one of the worst bottlenecks in the region. Another study that same year by the Texas A&M Transportation Institute ranked Chattanooga the second-most congested city of its size in the country. The American Transportation Research Institute ranked the Split the seventh worst bottleneck in the United States for trucks in 2021, and the 10th worst in 2022. The Split fell to number 59 in 2023 after the first phase of its reconstruction was completed. While the second phase was underway, the interchange ranked as the 30th worst bottleneck in 2026.

== History ==
=== Construction and early history ===
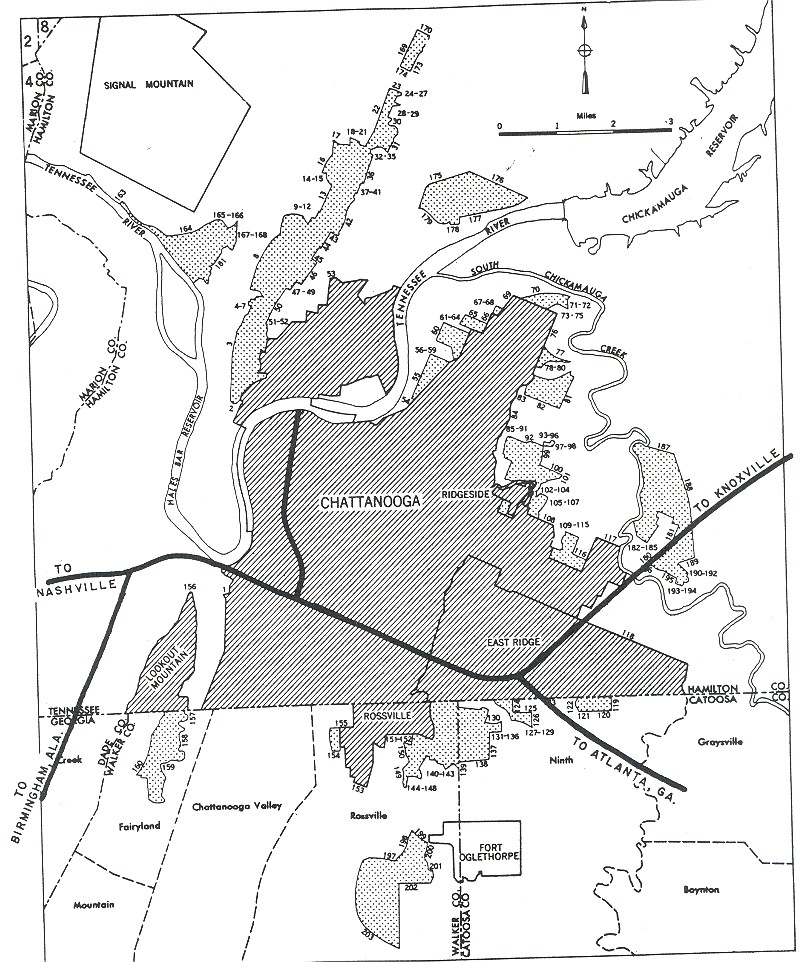
1955 Bureau of Public Roads highway plan for Chattanooga

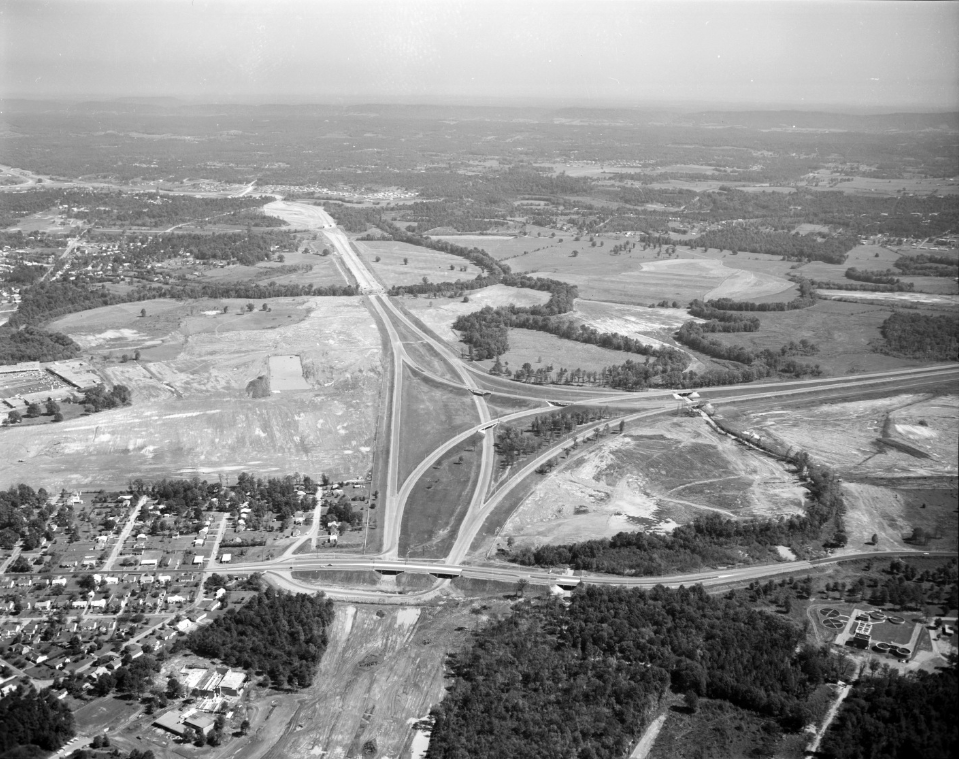
The Split shortly after construction was completed, looking east

The 75/24 Split, along with both Interstates, were part of the original stretches of Interstate Highways authorized by the Federal-Aid Highway Act of 1956. On July 26, 1959, the contract to construct the interchange, along with the stretch of I-75 extending to the Georgia state line, was awarded to Oman Construction of Nashville. The interchange was dedicated on May 31, 1961, in a ceremony officiated by state highway commissioner D. W. Moulton, Chattanooga Mayor P. R. Olgiati, and Hamilton County Judge (now County Mayor) Chester Frost. The interchange cost US$3.32 million (equivalent to about $36M in 2025), and was one of the first sections of both I-75 and I-24 to be completed in Tennessee. Referred to at the time as the Spring Creek Interchange, the interchange was constructed in a simple directional-T configuration, with ramps to and from I-24 connecting to I-75 northbound from the left. When first opened, I-75 north of and I-24 west of the interchange were not yet complete; traffic heading in the direction of I-24 westbound had to use temporary connections to Spring Creek Road, and I-75 northbound traffic had to turn around at South Chickamauga Creek. In late October 1962, I-24 was extended approximately 2 miles (3.2 km) to Belvoir Avenue, and on December 7, 1962, the 2.1-mile (3.4 km) section of I-75 between the Split and SR 320 (East Brainerd Road) opened, which also opened the remaining ramps on the interchange.

Between its initial construction and eventual reconstruction, the interchange changed little from its original configuration, although I-75 was widened to six and eight lanes south of the interchange in the late 1980s and from four to eight lanes north of the interchange in the early 1990s. As traffic increased in the succeeding decades, the configuration of the Split gradually became inadequate. The ramp between I-75 northbound and I-24 westbound, which reduced from two lanes to one, became a pronounced bottleneck, and sharp curves in the interchange became more hazardous, especially for trucks.

=== Reconstruction ===
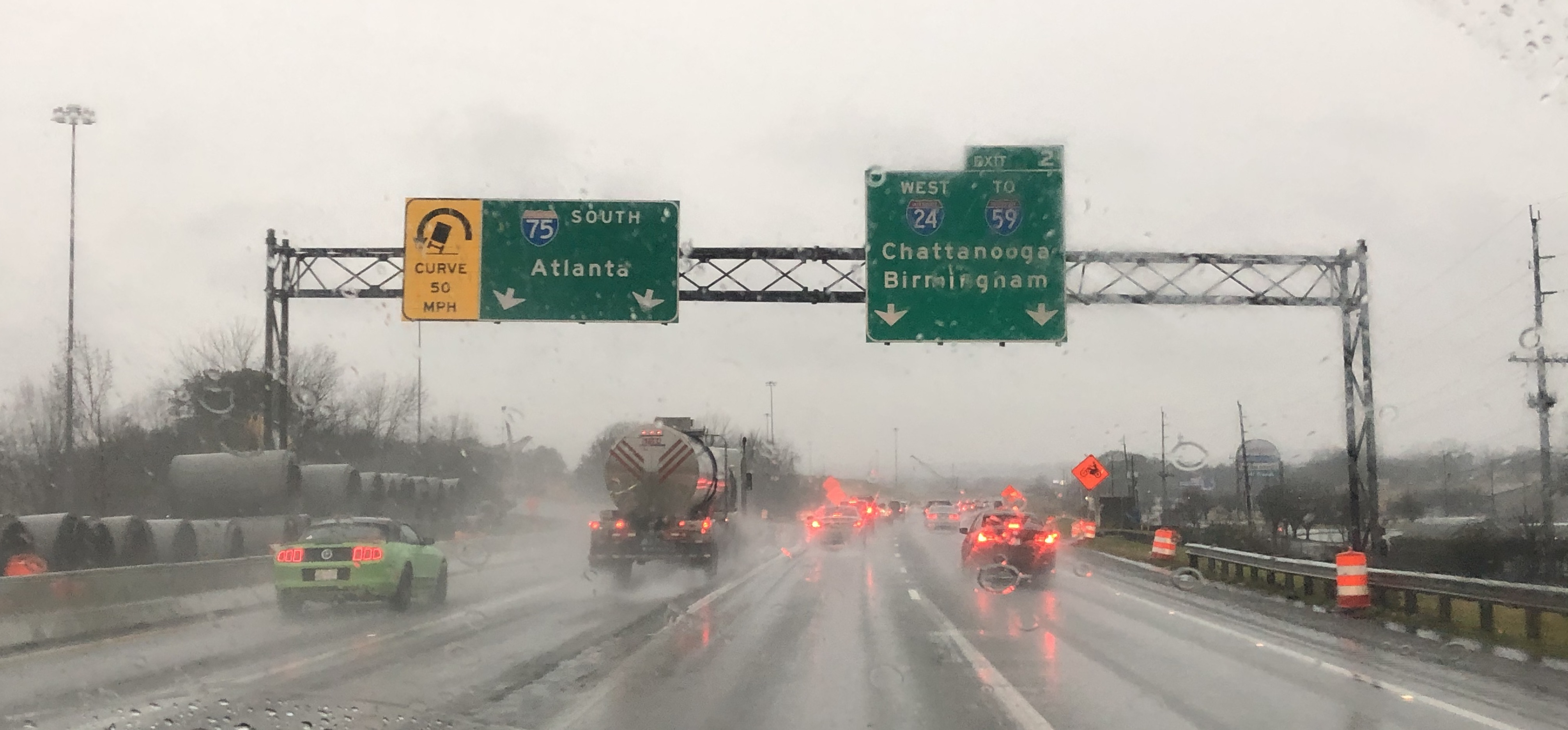
Approaching the Split on I-75 southbound in the rain on December 22, 2019

By the 2000s, the Split had become obsolete, and in November 2012, TDOT unveiled a concept to reconstruct the entire interchange, expected to cost more than $100 million. After the Tennessee General Assembly passed the IMPROVE Act in 2017, which increased the state's fuel taxes and vehicle registration fees with the intent of funding a backlog of 962 needed transportation projects, reconstruction of the Split became a top priority. However, the final design ended up being far more complex than initial concepts, requiring the project to be split into two phases.

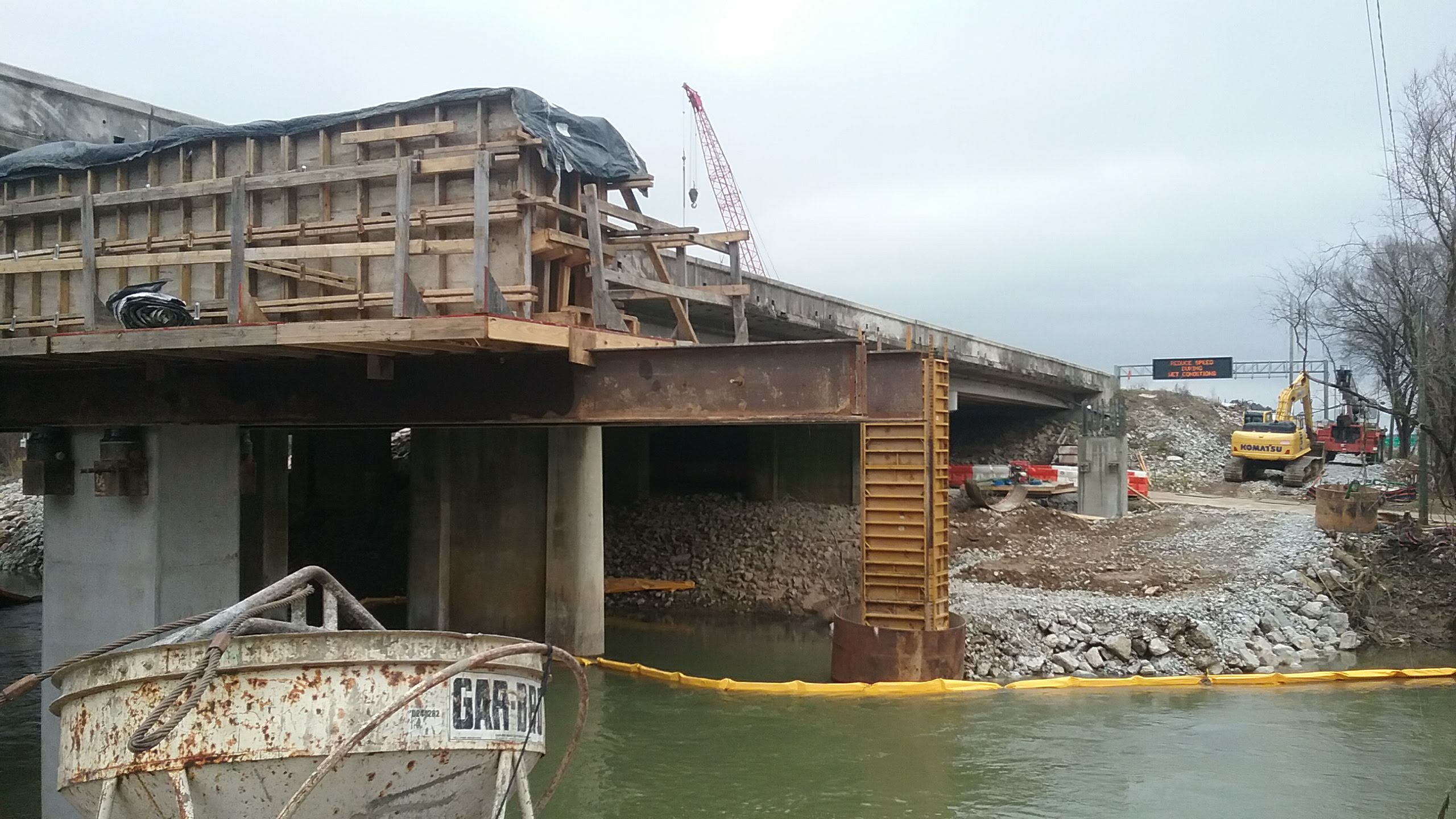
Reconstruction activities along I-75 over South Chickamauga Creek approaching the Split on January 31, 2021

On December 21, 2018, TDOT awarded a design-build contract for the first phase of the reconstruction at a cost of $132.6 million (equivalent to about $170M in 2025) to C.W. Matthews Contracting of Marietta, Georgia. The first phase involved reconfiguring most of the interchange. I-75 was reconstructed as a straighter six-lane mainline through the interchange, with all left-hand movements removed, and both ramps from I-24 eastbound were widened to three lanes, with the one connecting to I-75 northbound reconfigured to become the top level of the interchange. A collector–distributor facility that carries traffic directly from US 41 and the Tennessee Welcome Center along I-75 southbound was constructed, providing direct access to both I-75 southbound and I-24 westbound. Both ramps from I-75 to I-24 were left in their original lane configurations, but additional space was provided to widen them to three lanes in the second phase. The overpasses on Spring Creek Road directly west of the interchange were also rebuilt to allow for additional lanes on I-24 in the second phase. On April 1, 2019, weeks before the reconstruction project began, part of the bridge on I-75 southbound over the ramp from I-75 northbound to I-24 westbound collapsed, injuring one person and blocking traffic for hours. TDOT's chief engineer said that the collapse was most likely caused by weakening of the bridge's rail that occurred when an illegally oversized load hit the bridge. Preliminary work on phase 1 began in May 2019, and the project was completed on August 19, 2021, slightly over contract at a cost of $133.5 million.

After the first phase was completed, the two-to-one lane bottleneck on the ramp from I-75 northbound to I-24 westbound was left in place for the second phase, a decision which received criticism. In preparation for the second phase, the Belvoir Avenue overpass and Germantown Road underpass were replaced in a $32.4 million project between May 2020 and August 2021. The latter replacement utilized accelerated bridge construction by shifting I-24 traffic onto the Germantown Road entrance and exit ramp and the adjacent North and South Terrace Roads, two frontage roads on both sides of I-24, for three weekends between April and June 2021.

On November 28, 2022, TDOT awarded the contract for the second phase to Wright Brothers Construction of Charleston, Tennessee, for $162 million. The project consisted of reconstructing and widening I-24 between the interchange and Germantown Road, which initially required replacement of the McBrien Road and Moore Road overpasses. This stretch of I-24, which was originally three lanes in each direction, was expanded to four lanes in each direction, in addition to new auxiliary and merge lanes between Moore Road and the Split. The orientation of the ramps at the Belvoir Avenue/Germantown Road interchange were reversed to reduce weaving, and the widening of this section allowed all of the ramps in the Split to be expanded to three lanes. The section of I-75 between approximately 1.5 miles (2.4 km) east of the Split and SR 320 was widened from four to five lanes in each direction, and a railroad overpass along this section was replaced and raised. Final design work began in the spring of 2023, and construction began on July 13, 2023. The project was originally slated for completion in late summer 2025, but in April 2025, TDOT officials announced that the section of I-75 around the railroad crossing and the SR 320 interchange was behind schedule, and the project would continue past its original deadline. In July 2025, further delays were reported, and the projected completion date was revised to spring 2026. The delays were reported to have been caused by coordination problems with CSX over the replacement of the railroad bridge, which pushed the start of that portion of the project to early 2024. Between August 3 and 5, 2025, the final alignments of the ramps in the interchange were opened. The final phase was completed and dedicated in a ceremony on April 24, 2026. The final cost of the entire reconstruction project was $328 million.
