= Massac County, Illinois =

County in Illinois, United States

- County
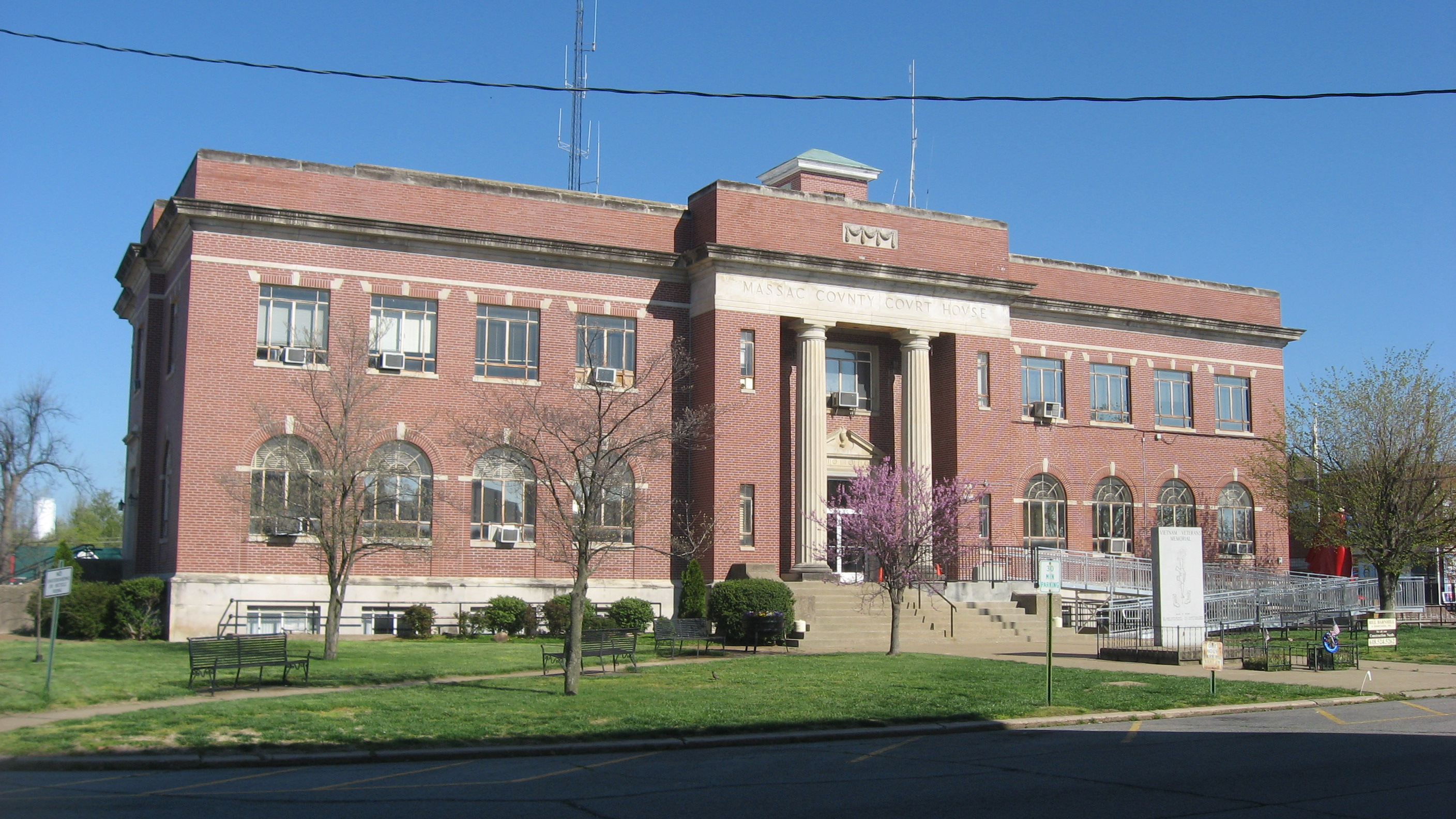
- Massac County Courthouse in Metropolis

- Location within the U.S. state of Illinois
- Coordinates: 37°13′N 88°43′W
- Country: United States
- State: Illinois
- Founded: February 8, 1843
- Seat: Metropolis
- Largest city: Metropolis

Area
  - Total: 242 sq mi (630 km^{2})
  - Land: 237 sq mi (610 km^{2})
  - Water: 4.6 sq mi (12 km^{2}) 1.9%

Population (2020)
  - Total: 14,169
  - Estimate (2025): 13,502 ▼
  - Density: 59.8/sq mi (23.1/km^{2})
- Time zone: UTC−6 (Central)
  - Summer (DST): UTC−5 (CDT)
- Congressional district: 12th
- Website: www.massaccountyil.gov

Massac County is a county in the U.S. state of Illinois. According to the 2020 census, it had a population of 14,169. Established in 1843 and named for a French fort founded in the 18th century, its county seat is Metropolis. Massac County is included in the Paducah, KY-IL Metropolitan Statistical Area. It is located along the Ohio River, in the portion of the state known locally as "Little Egypt".

== History ==
This area was occupied by various cultures of indigenous peoples for thousands of years before European contact. Evidence has been found of indigenous occupancy since the Archaic Period (8000 to 2000 BCE). More development took place in the Early Woodland period, such as the Adena culture (1000 to 200 BCE). Middle and Late Woodland occupancy continued to about 1000CE, before the rise of the Mississippian culture along the Mississippi River and its major tributaries. It influenced a continent-wide trading and cultural network.

The most complex and last indigenous culture was that of the Mississippian. The people at this time developed a large settlement during the period 1050CE to 1400-1450CE. At what is known as the Kincaid Site, considered a chiefdom of a stratified society, the people built a total of 19 complex earthwork mounds, including an elite burial mound, and great plaza as the monuments at the center of a large residential settlement.

This site is now operated by the state and is designated as a National Historic Landmark. The people abandoned the site about 1500, perhaps because of environmental reasons, such as running out of timber or game. No evidence has been found that any historic Native American tribes occupied the site in the centuries before European-American settlement. This did not take place until three centuries later, with most occurring 400 years later.

While this was part of the Illinois Country claimed by French explorers, this area was barely settled by their colonists. Most French colonial villages, such as Prairie du Rocher, were close to the Mississippi River. During the French and Indian War against the British, the French built a fort here in 1757. It was named Fort Massac after Claude Louis d'Espinchal, Marquis de Massiac, the French Naval Minister. Massiac is a commune in Cantal, France. The county was later named after Massac.

After the American Revolution, initially this area was settled by people from the South, who migrated along the Ohio River. Southern Illinois was given the colloquial name of "Little Egypt." Massac County was not formally organized until February 8, 1843, when population had increased, and it was made up of territory from both Johnson and Pope counties. It was developed for agriculture.

In the mid-19th century, after the revolutions of 1848, Illinois received many German immigrants, who changed the politics of the county. They were pro-Union and the Republican Party at the time of the American Civil War and after, whereas the ethnic Southerners had favored the Confederacy and Democratic Party. The ethnic German descendants today comprise nearly one-third of the population of Massac County.

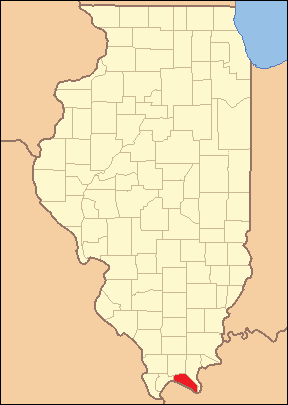
Massac County at the time of its creation in 1843

== Geography ==
According to the U.S. Census Bureau, the county has a total area of 242 square miles (630 km^{2}), of which 237 square miles (610 km^{2}) is land and 4.6 square miles (12 km^{2}) (1.9%) is water.

=== Climate and weather ===
Metropolis, Illinois

Climate chart (precipitation, max. and min. temperature)
J	F	M	A	M	J	J	A	S	O	N	D
3.5 42 25	3.9 48 29	4.4 58 38	4.7 69 47	4.8 77 56	4 86 64	4.3 90 68	3 88 66	3.3 82 59	3.2 71 47	4.5 58 38	4.4 47 29
- █ Average max. and min. temperatures in °F
- █ Precipitation totals in inches
- Source: The Weather Channel
Metric conversion
J	F	M	A	M	J	J	A	S	O	N	D
89 6 −4	99 9 −2	112 14 3	119 21 8	121 25 13	102 30 18	109 32 20	76 31 19	83 28 15	82 22 8	113 14 3	111 8 −2
- █ Average max. and min. temperatures in °C
- █ Precipitation totals in mm

In recent years, average temperatures in the county seat of Metropolis have ranged from a low of 25 °F (−4 °C) in January to a high of 90 °F (32 °C) in July, although a record low of −21 °F (−29 °C) was recorded in January 1984 and a record high of 105 °F (41 °C) was recorded in July 1999. Average monthly precipitation ranged from 3.00 inches (76 mm) in August to 4.76 inches (121 mm) in May.

=== Major highways ===
- Interstate 24
- U.S. Route 45
- Illinois Route 145
- Illinois Route 169

=== Adjacent counties ===
- Pope County - north
- Livingston County, Kentucky - east
- McCracken County, Kentucky - south
- Pulaski County - west
- Johnson County - northwest

=== National protected area ===
- Shawnee National Forest (part)

== Demographics ==
Historical population
Census	Pop.	Note	%±
1850	4,092		—
1860	6,213		51.8%
1870	9,581		54.2%
1880	10,443		9.0%
1890	11,313		8.3%
1900	13,110		15.9%
1910	14,200		8.3%
1920	13,559		−4.5%
1930	14,081		3.8%
1940	14,937		6.1%
1950	13,594		−9.0%
1960	14,341		5.5%
1970	13,889		−3.2%
1980	14,990		7.9%
1990	14,752		−1.6%
2000	15,161		2.8%
2010	15,429		1.8%
2020	14,169		−8.2%
2025 (est.)	13,502	▼	−4.7%
U.S. Decennial Census; 1790-1960 1900-1990; 1990-2000 2010-2013

=== 2020 census ===
As of the 2020 census, the county had a population of 14,169. The median age was 44.3 years. 22.7% of residents were under the age of 18 and 21.3% of residents were 65 years of age or older. For every 100 females there were 93.6 males, and for every 100 females age 18 and over there were 90.9 males age 18 and over.

The racial makeup of the county was 86.0% White, 6.3% Black or African American, 0.3% American Indian and Alaska Native, 0.3% Asian, <0.1% Native Hawaiian and Pacific Islander, 1.2% from some other race, and 5.9% from two or more races. Hispanic or Latino residents of any race comprised 2.4% of the population.

47.1% of residents lived in urban areas, while 52.9% lived in rural areas.

There were 5,871 households in the county, of which 29.0% had children under the age of 18 living in them. Of all households, 46.5% were married-couple households, 19.2% were households with a male householder and no spouse or partner present, and 28.2% were households with a female householder and no spouse or partner present. About 30.7% of all households were made up of individuals and 15.0% had someone living alone who was 65 years of age or older.

There were 6,797 housing units, of which 13.6% were vacant. Among occupied housing units, 76.0% were owner-occupied and 24.0% were renter-occupied. The homeowner vacancy rate was 2.7% and the rental vacancy rate was 11.6%.

=== Racial and ethnic composition ===
Massac County, Illinois – Racial and ethnic composition Note: the US Census treats Hispanic/Latino as an ethnic category. This table excludes Latinos from the racial categories and assigns them to a separate category. Hispanics/Latinos may be of any race.
Race / Ethnicity (NH = Non-Hispanic)	Pop 1980	Pop 1990	Pop 2000	Pop 2010	Pop 2020	% 1980	% 1990	% 2000	% 2010	% 2020
White alone (NH)	13,977	13,763	13,962	13,860	12,077	93.24%	93.30%	92.09%	89.83%	85.24%
Black or African American alone (NH)	898	869	826	891	875	5.99%	5.89%	5.45%	5.77%	6.18%
Native American or Alaska Native alone (NH)	13	37	29	59	35	0.09%	0.25%	0.19%	0.38%	0.25%
Asian alone (NH)	22	31	38	41	43	0.15%	0.21%	0.25%	0.27%	0.30%
Native Hawaiian or Pacific Islander alone (NH)	x	x	0	0	6	x	x	0.00%	0.00%	0.04%
Other race alone (NH)	21	8	15	12	61	0.14%	0.05%	0.10%	0.08%	0.43%
Mixed race or Multiracial (NH)	x	x	168	276	739	x	x	1.11%	1.79%	5.22%
Hispanic or Latino (any race)	59	44	123	290	333	0.39%	0.30%	0.81%	1.88%	2.35%
Total	14,990	14,752	15,161	15,429	14,169	100.00%	100.00%	100.00%	100.00%	100.00%

=== 2010 census ===
As of the 2010 United States census, there were 15,429 people, 6,362 households, and 4,242 families residing in the county. The population density was 65.0 inhabitants per square mile (25.1/km^{2}). There were 7,113 housing units at an average density of 30.0 per square mile (11.6/km^{2}). The racial makeup of the county was 91.0% white, 5.9% black or African American, 0.4% American Indian, 0.3% Asian, 0.5% from other races, and 2.0% from two or more races. Those of Hispanic or Latino origin made up 1.9% of the population. In terms of ancestry, 25.7% were German, 16.1% were Irish, 8.5% were English, and 8.5% were American.

Of the 6,362 households, 30.8% had children under the age of 18 living with them, 50.3% were married couples living together, 12.0% had a female householder with no husband present, 33.3% were non-families, and 29.2% of all households were made up of individuals. The average household size was 2.38 and the average family size was 2.91. The median age was 42.1 years.

The median income for a household in the county was $41,077 and the median income for a family was $51,794. Males had a median income of $46,231 versus $25,717 for females. The per capita income for the county was $20,216. About 9.7% of families and 13.7% of the population were below the poverty line, including 21.5% of those under age 18 and 11.7% of those age 65 or over.

== Communities ==
=== Cities ===
- Brookport
- Metropolis

=== Village ===
- Joppa

=== Unincorporated communities ===
- Big Bay
- Boaz
- Hillerman
- New Columbia
- Shady Grove
- Unionville

=== Forts ===
- Fort Massac

== Politics ==
United States presidential election results for Massac County, Illinois
Year	Republican		Democratic		Third party(ies)	
Year	No.	%	No.	%	No.	%
1892	1,652	62.53%	799	30.24%	191	7.23%
1896	2,046	69.64%	869	29.58%	23	0.78%
1900	2,057	71.18%	796	27.54%	37	1.28%
1904	2,078	74.72%	589	21.18%	114	4.10%
1908	2,084	73.67%	652	23.05%	93	3.29%
1912	1,341	48.06%	599	21.47%	850	30.47%
1916	3,926	73.76%	1,236	23.22%	161	3.02%
1920	3,731	82.98%	688	15.30%	77	1.71%
1924	3,227	71.44%	920	20.37%	370	8.19%
1928	3,405	72.87%	1,241	26.56%	27	0.58%
1932	2,851	51.60%	2,593	46.93%	81	1.47%
1936	3,894	55.76%	3,039	43.52%	50	0.72%
1940	4,722	62.34%	2,813	37.14%	39	0.51%
1944	3,814	67.53%	1,758	31.13%	76	1.35%
1948	3,201	62.46%	1,842	35.94%	82	1.60%
1952	4,212	60.78%	2,711	39.12%	7	0.10%
1956	4,265	64.34%	2,359	35.59%	5	0.08%
1960	4,521	63.05%	2,644	36.87%	6	0.08%
1964	3,078	47.54%	3,396	52.46%	0	0.00%
1968	3,578	55.51%	1,934	30.00%	934	14.49%
1972	4,313	69.99%	1,831	29.71%	18	0.29%
1976	3,226	46.50%	3,666	52.85%	45	0.65%
1980	4,284	58.91%	2,821	38.79%	167	2.30%
1984	3,827	54.29%	3,194	45.31%	28	0.40%
1988	3,507	51.86%	3,227	47.72%	29	0.43%
1992	2,754	39.03%	3,347	47.43%	955	13.53%
1996	2,507	41.38%	2,841	46.90%	710	11.72%
2000	3,676	54.51%	2,912	43.18%	156	2.31%
2004	4,578	61.66%	2,805	37.78%	41	0.55%
2008	4,371	60.63%	2,693	37.36%	145	2.01%
2012	4,278	65.87%	2,092	32.21%	125	1.92%
2016	4,846	72.36%	1,558	23.26%	293	4.38%
2020	4,997	73.29%	1,725	25.30%	96	1.41%
2024	4,939	73.68%	1,683	25.11%	81	1.21%

In its pre-Civil War history, the people of Massac County, which like most of Southern Illinois was settled by Southerners, were strongly Democratic. While Illinois was a free state, people of this region were opposed to the abolitionist politics of the northern regions of the state. County voters chose Democratic candidates in every Presidential election up to and including 1860.

But the region also had numerous ethnic Germans who had arrived after the revolutions of 1848. They favored the Union, and provided a number of Union soldiers rivaled on a per-capita basis only by a few fiercely Unionist counties in Appalachia. For the next century, Massac County voters favored Republican candidates for the presidency. During this period, the county's voters gave a plurality to every Republican nominee. They supported William Howard Taft in 1912, when the GOP was bitterly divided. During the Great Depression, Franklin D. Roosevelt lost the county in 1936 by a greater margin than he did in 1932, when his popularity elsewhere increased as people benefited from government programs. Between 1896 and 1928, no Democratic presidential candidate gained thirty percent of the county's vote.

In the 1964 election, following the assassination of President John F. Kennedy and during the Vietnam War, incumbent Lyndon Johnson was the first Democrat in 104 years to carry Massac County. Locally voters opposed Barry Goldwater’s economic policies and his Deep Southern orientation. Southern Evangelical Jimmy Carter marginally bettered LBJ's performance in 1976. Bill Clinton won a larger plurality in 1992, due to a third-party challenge from Ross Perot.

But, since 2000 the conservative whites have shifted to the Republican Party in favoring presidential candidates. Some analysts say the conservatives changed parties because of socio-cultural issues. In 2016 Hillary Clinton won 23.3 percent share of the county's vote, the lowest by a Democrat since John W. Davis in his landslide 1924 loss. In 2020 they gave Donald Trump 73.3% of their vote and Joe Biden 25.3%. Overall, state voters favored Biden, who won the election in both popular and electoral college votes.

The county was the only county in Illinois to vote against Barack Obama in both of his presidential runs, his 2004 Senate run, and the 2008 Democratic Primary, where a majority of residents voted for Hillary Clinton instead. The county did vote for Obama unanimously in the 2012 Democratic presidential primary against the anti-abortion protest candidacy of Randall Terry.

For the purposes of Illinois law, the three established political parties in the county are the Democratic Party, Republican Party, and Constitution Party as all have received 5% or greater of the vote in a recent election. Massac County is the only county in the state in which the Constitution Party is an established political party. The Constitution Party's established political party status allows it to have the same reduced barriers to ballot access as the Democratic and Republican parties and to hold primaries. In the 2022 primary, a single voter requested a Constitution Party ballot. Their sole candidate on the ballot, a candidate for county clerk, received 14% of the vote in the 2022 general election. In the 2024 primary, four voters pulled a ballot for the Constitution Party.

== See also ==
- National Register of Historic Places listings in Massac County, Illinois
- Massac County High School
