= Goreville, Illinois =

- Village
- Location of Goreville in Johnson County, Illinois.
- Coordinates: 37°33′14″N 88°58′26″W
- Country: United States
- State: Illinois
- County: Johnson

Area
  - Total: 2.71 sq mi (7.01 km^{2})
  - Land: 2.69 sq mi (6.96 km^{2})
  - Water: 0.023 sq mi (0.06 km^{2})
- Elevation: 722 ft (220 m)

Population (2020)
  - Total: 1,068
  - Density: 397.7/sq mi (153.55/km^{2})
- Time zone: UTC-6 (CST)
  - Summer (DST): UTC-5 (CDT)
- ZIP code: 62939
- Area code: 618
- FIPS code: 17-30575
- GNIS feature ID: 2398181
- Website: villageofgoreville.gov

Goreville is a village in Johnson County, Illinois, United States. The population was 1,068 as of the 2020 census, up from 1,049 at the 2010 census.

== History ==
The village is named after John Gore, who bought 40 acres of land in the area from the United States Government in 1854. Gore operated a general store on the property. In 1866 a post office was built on the land and it was named Goreville in honor of him.

In 1898 the Chicago and Eastern Illinois Railroad built a train line about a mile northeast of town. Some of the town's businesses moved closer to the tracks and others formed by the tracks as the town grew. The Village of Goreville officially incorporated on April 18, 1900, with a population of 406.

== Geography ==
Goreville is located in northwestern Johnson County and is bordered to the south by Ferne Clyffe State Park. Illinois Route 37 passes through the village, leading south 6 miles (10 km) to Buncombe and north 5 miles (8 km) to Interstate 57 at Exit 45, just north of that highway's interchange with Interstate 24.

According to the 2021 census gazetteer files, Goreville has a total area of 2.71 square miles (7.02 km^{2}), of which 2.69 square miles (6.97 km^{2}) (or 99.19%) is land and 0.02 square miles (0.05 km^{2}) (or 0.81%) is water.

== Demographics ==
Historical population
Census	Pop.	Note	%±
1900	406		—
1910	554		36.5%
1920	581		4.9%
1930	531		−8.6%
1940	508		−4.3%
1950	581		14.4%
1960	625		7.6%
1970	1,109		77.4%
1980	978		−11.8%
1990	872		−10.8%
2000	938		7.6%
2010	1,049		11.8%
2020	1,068		1.8%
U.S. Decennial Census

=== 2020 census ===
As of the 2020 census, Goreville had a population of 1,068. The median age was 41.5 years. 24.3% of residents were under the age of 18 and 21.8% of residents were 65 years of age or older. For every 100 females there were 86.4 males, and for every 100 females age 18 and over there were 78.2 males age 18 and over.

The population density was 394.39 inhabitants per square mile (152.27/km^{2}). There were 478 housing units at an average density of 176.51 per square mile (68.15/km^{2}).

0.0% of residents lived in urban areas, while 100.0% lived in rural areas.

There were 451 households in Goreville, of which 33.5% had children under the age of 18 living in them. Of all households, 47.0% were married-couple households, 14.9% were households with a male householder and no spouse or partner present, and 31.0% were households with a female householder and no spouse or partner present. About 25.5% of all households were made up of individuals and 13.1% had someone living alone who was 65 years of age or older.

Of the 478 housing units, 5.6% were vacant. The homeowner vacancy rate was 1.9% and the rental vacancy rate was 0.7%.

Racial composition as of the 2020 census
Race	Number	Percent
White	999	93.5%
Black or African American	4	0.4%
American Indian and Alaska Native	0	0.0%
Asian	4	0.4%
Native Hawaiian and Other Pacific Islander	0	0.0%
Some other race	9	0.8%
Two or more races	52	4.9%
Hispanic or Latino (of any race)	14	1.3%

=== Income and poverty ===
The median income for a household in the village was $58,750, and the median income for a family was $66,875. Males had a median income of $51,250 versus $26,136 for females. The per capita income for the village was $29,339. About 10.1% of families and 12.3% of the population were below the poverty line, including 13.5% of those under age 18 and 7.3% of those age 65 or over.
