= Tunnel Hill, Illinois =

Tunnel Hill
- Unincorporated community
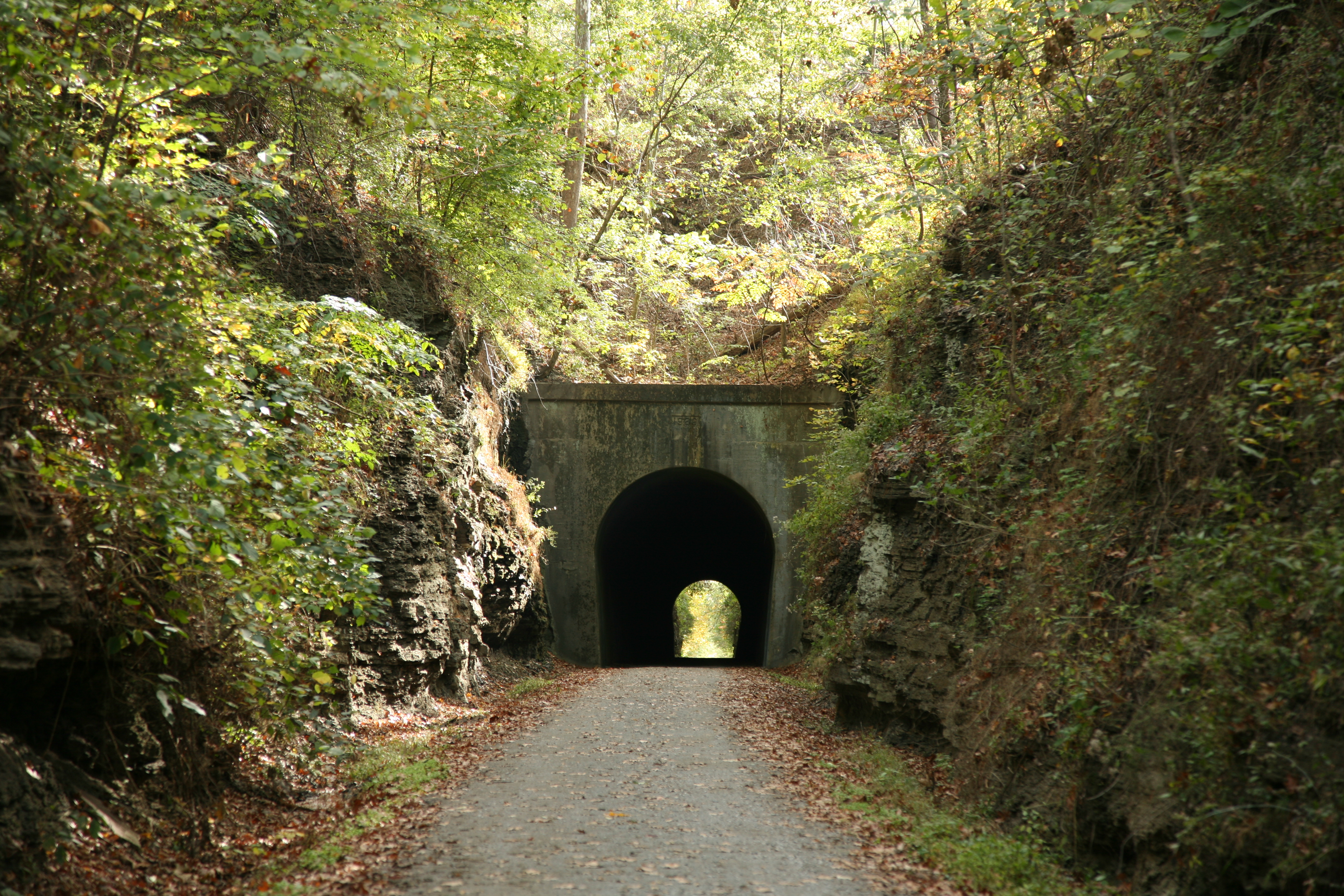
- Tunnel Hill, high point and eponym of the Tunnel Hill State Trail

- Location of Tunnel Hill within Illinois Tunnel Hill (the United States)
- Coordinates: 37°31′25″N 88°50′19″W
- Country: United States
- State: Illinois
- County: Johnson
- Time zone: UTC-6 (CST)
  - Summer (DST): UTC-5 (CDT)
- Postal code: 62972
- Area code: 618

Tunnel Hill is an unincorporated community in northwestern Johnson County, Illinois. It is best known for its namesake railroad tunnel that gives the name to the Tunnel Hill State Trail, a rails-to-trails project developed by the Illinois Department of Natural Resources.
