= Pulleys Mill, Illinois =

- Unincorporated community
- Location within Illinois Location within the United States
- Coordinates: 37°36′00″N 88°58′46″W
- Country: United States
- State: Illinois
- County: Williamson
- Elevation: 597 ft (182 m)
- Time zone: UTC-6 (Central (CST))
  - Summer (DST): UTC-5 (CDT)
- ZIP Code: 62939
- Area code: 618
- GNIS feature ID: 1736162

Pulleys Mill is an unincorporated community in Williamson County, Illinois. It is generally located north of Goreville, near the western terminus of Interstate 24 at Interstate 57.

The area was named after Barton S. Pulley, and had a post office from October 28, 1864, to July 14, 1905. Mail is now routed through the nearby town of Goreville.
