= Interstate 24 Ohio River Bridge =

Two-span tied arch bridge over Ohio river

Coordinates: 37°8′0″N 88°41′14″W

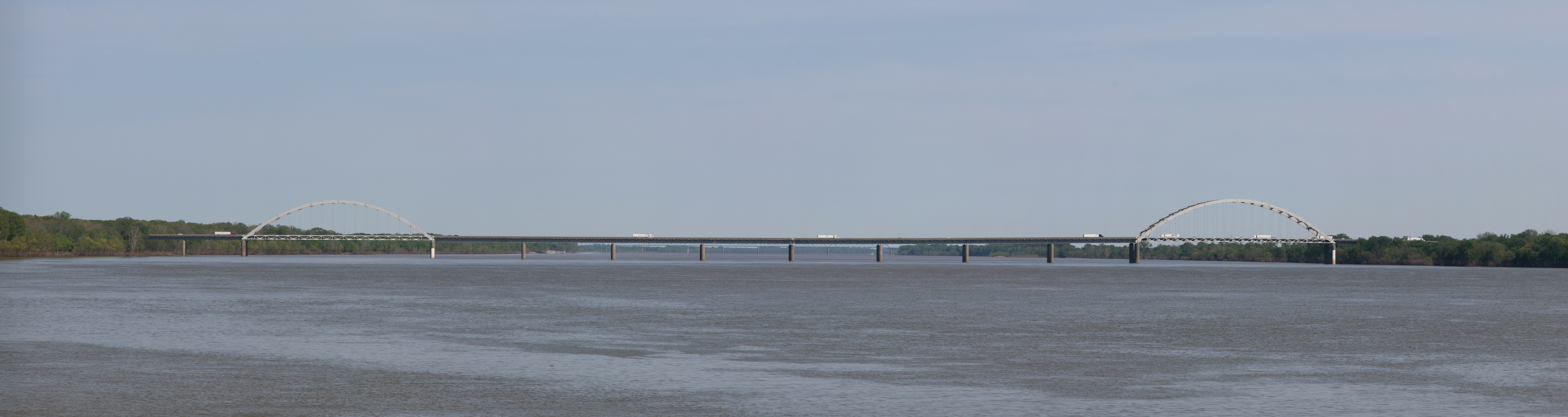
I-24 bridge across the Ohio River

The Interstate 24 Ohio River Bridge is a two-span tied-arch bridge that carries I-24 across the Ohio River. It is 5,623.4 feet (1,714.0 m) in length and has two main spans, 731.5 feet (223.0 m) and 633 feet (193 m) long. It is one of two road bridges connecting the Metropolis-Brookport, Illinois area with Paducah, Kentucky, with the other being the Brookport Bridge upstream to the east. Construction on the bridge began in June 1968, and it was opened to traffic on October 18, 1974, after many delays.
