= Karnak, Illinois =

Karnak
- Village
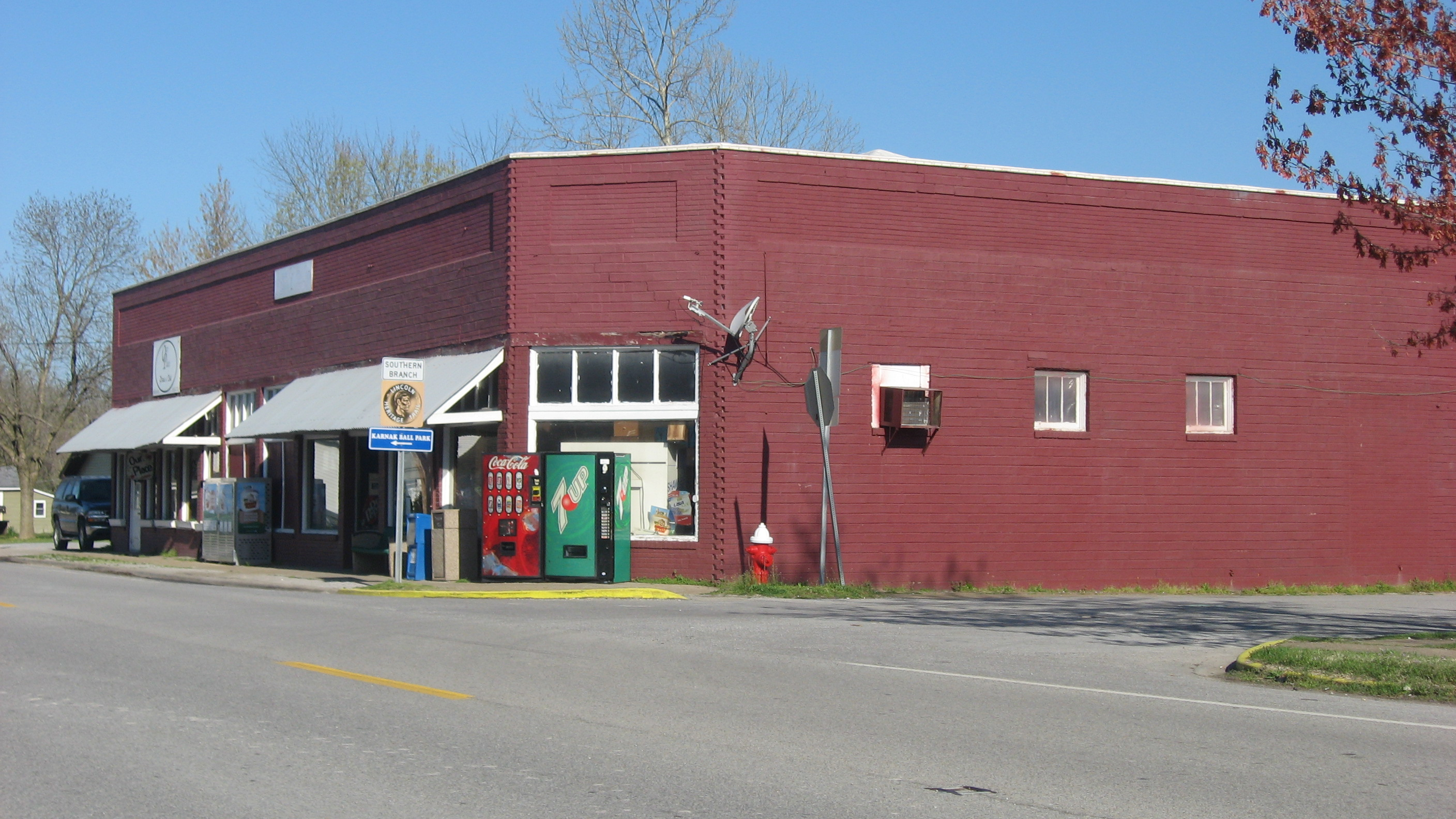
- Downtown Karnak

- Location of Karnak in Pulaski County, Illinois.

- Location of Illinois in the United States
- Coordinates: 37°17′32″N 88°58′30″W
- Country: United States
- State: Illinois
- County: Pulaski

Area
  - Total: 1.81 sq mi (4.69 km^{2})
  - Land: 1.81 sq mi (4.68 km^{2})
  - Water: 0.0039 sq mi (0.01 km^{2})
- Elevation: 341 ft (104 m)

Population (2020)
  - Total: 430
  - Density: 238.1/sq mi (91.92/km^{2})
- Time zone: UTC-6 (CST)
  - Summer (DST): UTC-5 (CDT)
- ZIP Code(s): 62956
- Area code: 618
- FIPS code: 17-39077
- GNIS feature ID: 2398329
- Wikimedia Commons: Karnak, Illinois
- Website: www.villageofkarnak.com

Karnak is a village in Pulaski County, Illinois, United States. As of the 2020 census, Karnak had a population of 430.

== History ==
A post office called Karnak has been in operation since 1905. The village, which resides in the Little Egypt region, was named after the Karnak temple site.

== Geography ==
Karnak is located at 37°17′32″N 88°58′30″W (37.292146, -88.974920).

According to the 2010 census, Karnak has a total area of 1.814 square miles (4.70 km^{2}), of which 1.81 square miles (4.69 km^{2}) (or 99.78%) is land and 0.004 square miles (0.01 km^{2}) (or 0.22%) is water.

== Demographics ==
Historical population
Census	Pop.	Note	%±
1920	613		—
1930	771		25.8%
1940	893		15.8%
1950	792		−11.3%
1960	667		−15.8%
1970	641		−3.9%
1980	646		0.8%
1990	581		−10.1%
2000	619		6.5%
2010	499		−19.4%
2020	430		−13.8%
U.S. Decennial Census

As of the census of 2000, there were 619 people, 263 households, and 174 families residing in the village. The population density was 341.4 inhabitants per square mile (131.8/km^{2}). There were 293 housing units at an average density of 161.6 per square mile (62.4/km^{2}). The racial makeup of the village was 93.70% White, 5.49% African American, 0.16% Asian, 0.65% from other races. Hispanic or Latino of any race were 3.88% of the population.

There were 263 households, out of which 27.4% had children under the age of 18 living with them, 49.8% were married couples living together, 13.7% had a female householder with no husband present, and 33.8% were non-families. 30.0% of all households were made up of individuals, and 16.7% had someone living alone who was 65 years of age or older. The average household size was 2.35 and the average family size was 2.90.

In the village, the population was spread out, with 25.7% under the age of 18, 7.9% from 18 to 24, 25.2% from 25 to 44, 19.7% from 45 to 64, and 21.5% who were 65 years of age or older. The median age was 38 years. For every 100 females, there were 82.1 males. For every 100 females age 18 and over, there were 78.3 males.

The median income for a household in the village was $28,125, and the median income for a family was $33,833. Males had a median income of $35,625 versus $16,635 for females. The per capita income for the village was $13,346. About 16.3% of families and 20.0% of the population were below the poverty line, including 27.4% of those under age 18 and 14.2% of those age 65 or over.
