= Tornado outbreak of April 27–28, 2002 =

Tornado Outbreak in April 2002

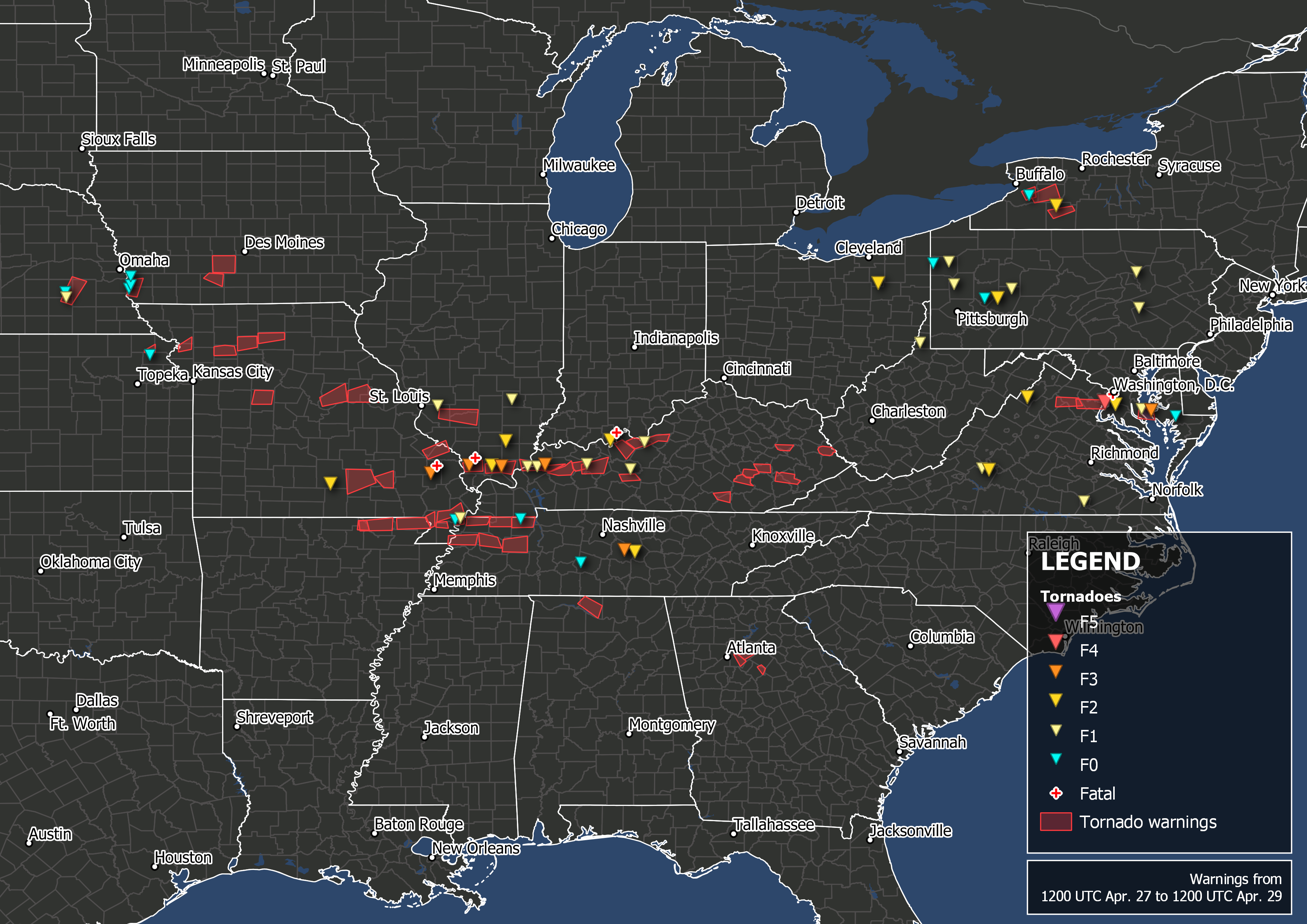
- Tornado warnings and confirmed tornadoes on April 27–28

Meteorological history
- Duration: April 27-28, 2002

Tornado outbreak
- Tornadoes: 48
- Max. rating: F4 tornado
- Duration: 2 days

Overall effects
- Fatalities: 6
- Injuries: 256
- Damage: ≥$224 million (2002 USD)
- Areas affected: Central & Eastern United States
- Part of the Tornadoes of 2002

A widespread, destructive tornado outbreak affected Iowa, Kansas, Missouri, and Nebraska on April 27, 2002, and Illinois, Indiana, Kentucky, Maryland, New York, Ohio, Pennsylvania, Tennessee, Virginia, and West Virginia on the following day, April 28. Generally, tornado reports were widely scattered in each state, but significant to severe damage was noted in multiple states. Overall, 48 tornadoes were confirmed along with 6 deaths, 256 injuries, and $224 million in damage, with wind and hail adding to the damage total.

== Meteorological synopsis ==
On April 25, the Storm Prediction Center first noted the potential for organized severe weather across the lower Missouri River Valley as an upper-level trough ejected eastward across the United States. The organization delineated a Moderate risk across most of Missouri, portions of Illinois, western Kentucky, western Tennessee, and northern Arkansas the following day. On the morning of April 27, forecasters noted a coupled jet stream across the country, with a 150 kn (175 mph; 280 km/h) 250 mb jet over James Bay and a 135 kn (155 mph; 250 km/h) jet over Oklahoma. In response to this favorable configuration, potent 850 mb winds of 60 kn (70 mph; 110 km/h) overspread Missouri, enhancing the northward progression of moisture. Within this warm air advection regime, several clusters of elevated atmospheric convection developed throughout the morning hours coincident with steep mid-level lapse rates—values representing the change in temperature with height—of 7.5 C/km, mainly posing a risk for marginally severe hail as they moved across Kansas, Missouri, Iowa, and Illinois. Given the strength of the surface low-pressure area progressing across Nebraska, forecasters noted the potential for dewpoints in excess of 60 °F (15 °C) to encroach as far north as southern Iowa, though the degree of destabilization (CAPE) was unclear given the coverage of cloud cover. Within hours, sunshine enveloped portions of central Kansas, where thunderstorms were expected to develop along the dryline stretching southward into central Texas. In this area, a moist and unstable environment materialized, but long and straight hodographs—plots showing the change in wind with height—favored a predominant large hail and damaging wind threat from any discrete activity before it congealed into a squall line overnight.

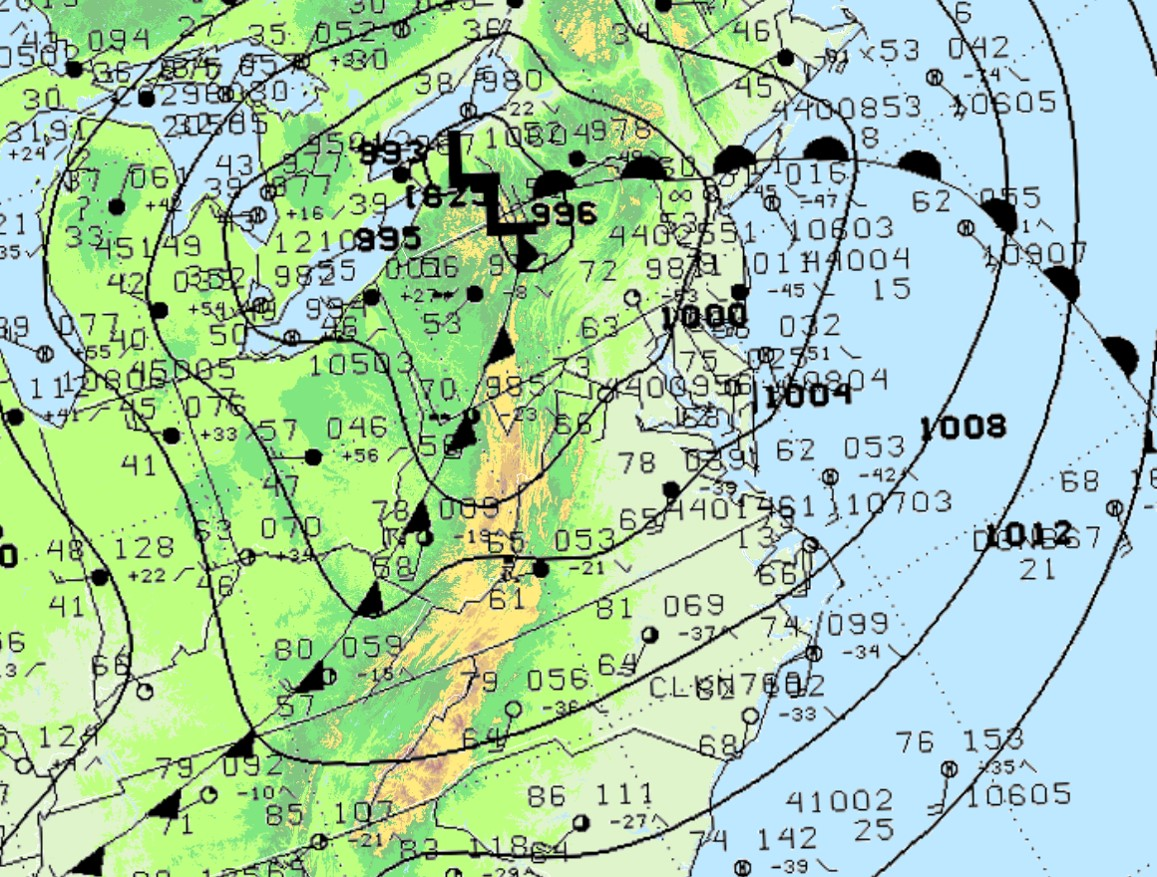
WPC surface analysis at 21:00 UTC on April 28, 2002

Farther north in southern Nebraska and Iowa, a greater tornado threat was expected to evolve along the warm front and east of the surface low, where wind shear and barometric pressure falls were most conducive for supercell thunderstorms capable of producing strong—F2 or greater on the Fujita scale—tornadoes. By the afternoon, widespread thunderstorm activity began to develop near the intersection of the dryline and warm front across northeastern Kansas, northwestern Missouri, and southwestern Iowa. Several weak tornadoes occurred in this region over ensuing hours. After sunset, the greatest risk for severe weather shifted across Missouri and eastward across several states into Ohio. Mid-level CAPE of 1,000–1,500 J/kg, effective bulk wind shear of 70 kn (80 mph; 130 km/h), and 0–1 km shear upwards of 50 kn (60 mph; 95 km/h) favored the formation of discrete supercell thunderstorms and bow echoes across much of the region into the overnight hours. The SPC noted that the isolated nature of supercells precluded the issuance of a High risk. Discrete or embedded supercells moved across Missouri, Illinois, Tennessee, and Kentucky during the pre-dawn hours, where wind shear remained very favorable for tornadoes given low-level storm relative helicity in excess of 500 m2/s2. Numerous tornadoes were confirmed, many of which were significant. By sunrise, the formation of several bow echoes suggested a transition to a greater damaging wind event.

During the morning of April 28, the SPC again outlined a Moderate risk of severe weather, this time stretching from Ohio eastward across much of the Mid-Atlantic. The powerful upper-level trough shifted eastward, now encompassing portions of the Ohio River Valley and Northeast in 200 mb winds greater than 100 kn (115 mph; 185 km/h). While a line of pre-frontal convection was ongoing during the early morning hours, this activity was expected to weaken as it encountered stable air across the Appalachian Mountains. Meanwhile, with a sharp cold front moving eastward across portions of the Ohio and Tennessee valleys, and into Pennsylvania as well, a severe squall line was expected to take shape and pose a risk for widespread damaging winds, severe hail, and one or two tornadoes. Across the Delmarva region, forecasters expected 1,000–2,000 J/kg of CAPE to develop amid a lee trough despite lingering clouds and precipitation. With large-scale forcing focused north of Virginia, only scattered thunderstorms were expected in this region, though the environment favored the potential for supercells. Into the afternoon hours, one particular supercell developed in central West Virginia and progressed eastward across Virginia, producing its first strong tornado in Shenandoah County. While much of this region had been located in stable air north of a warm front through the morning, that boundary lifted north after midday and allowed for rapid destabilization. Thus, as the supercell continued east across Virginia and Maryland, it notably produced a historic F4 tornado in La Plata, Maryland. Additional damaging tornadoes accompanied the storm until it moved offshore after sunset.

== Confirmed tornadoes ==
Confirmed tornadoes by Fujita rating
| FU | F0 | F1 | F2 | F3 | F4 | F5 | Total |
|---|---|---|---|---|---|---|---|
| 0 | 11 | 18 | 12 | 6 | 1 | 0 | 48 |

List of confirmed tornadoes during the tornado outbreak of April 27–28, 2002 (Note: All dates are based on the local time zone where the tornado touched down; however, all times are in Coordinated Universal Time for consistency.)
| F# | Location | County / Parish | State | Date | Start Coord. | Time (UTC) | Path length | Max width | Summary |
|---|---|---|---|---|---|---|---|---|---|
| F1 | W of Crete | Saline | NE | April 27 | 40.6°N 97.0333°W | 20:06–20:10 | 4.5 mi (7.2 km) | 40 yd (37 m) | One barn and some fences were destroyed. A few irrigation pivots were overturned, and a few trees were uprooted. Some houses sustained minor damage. |
| F0 | S of Milford | Seward | NE | April 27 | 40.7°N 97.05°W | 20:25 | 0.1 mi (0.16 km) | 20 yd (18 m) | A storm chaser filmed a brief tornado in open country. |
| F0 | SW of Effingham | Atchison | KS | April 27 | 39.5°N 95.4333°W | 21:10–21:13 | 0.25 mi (0.40 km) | 25 yd (23 m) | A grain truck was blown over and one house's windows were blown out. Two sheds were destroyed, and hay bales, lumber, and debris were strewn across the property. |
| F0 | NW of Percival | Fremont | IA | April 27 | 40.7666°N 95.8333°W | 21:41 | —N/a | 20 yd (18 m) | A storm chaser reported a brief tornado. |
| F0 | NW of Thurman | Fremont | IA | April 27 | 40.8333°N 95.8°W | 21:50 | —N/a | 20 yd (18 m) | A storm chaser reported a brief tornado. |
| F0 | S of Pacific Junction | Mills | IA | April 27 | 41.0°N 95.8°W | 21:58 | —N/a | 20 yd (18 m) | A storm chaser reported a brief tornado over an open field. |
| F1 | E of Belleville | St. Clair | IL | April 27 | 38.5333°N 89.9333°W | 03:35–03:38 | 1.7 mi (2.7 km) | 100 yd (91 m) | An elementary school, two large buildings, and 32 houses were damaged. A number of trees were snapped or uprooted. |
| F2 | N of Willow Springs | Howell | MO | April 27 | 37.01667°N 91.98333°W | 03:40–03:45 | 1.5 mi (2.4 km) | 100 yd (91 m) | A house and numerous outbuildings, including a barn, were severely damaged. The roofs of six other houses were either damaged or completely removed by the tornado. A church was rotated 45 degrees off its foundation, and adjacent cemetery headstones were toppled. A 365 ft (111 m) radio tower was blown over and landed on a house, a bass boat was tossed, and century-old trees were uprooted. |
| F1 | E of Kenner | Clay | IL | April 28 | 38.65°N 88.51667°W | 05:05–05:10 | 5 mi (8.0 km) | 200 yd (180 m) | A mobile home was demolished with debris tossed up to 1 mi (1.6 km) away, and its occupants suffered minor injuries. Three houses and another mobile home were damaged. An outbuilding was destroyed, and a propane tank was thrown 0.25 mi (0.40 km). A car was rolled three times and thrown into a ditch, injuring two of its occupants. |
| F3 | SW of Marble Hill | Bollinger | MO | April 28 | 37.2167°N 90.0667°W | 05:40–05:45 | 4 mi (6.4 km) | 200 yd (180 m) | 1 death – Six mobile homes were destroyed, and four others were severely damaged. Nineteen single-family houses also sustained significant damage. A 12-year-old boy was fatally injured after being tossed 50 yd (46 m) from his house as it was being destroyed, and six other residents were thrown into a nearby lake. The tornado also damaged or destroyed 50 outbuildings, tossed cars on top of one another, and downed a large number of trees. Sixteen people in total were injured, four of them seriously. |
| F2 | Galatia | Saline | IL | April 28 | 37.8333°N 88.6333°W | 06:07–06:16 | 7.5 mi (12.1 km) | 200 yd (180 m) | At least 55 structures were damaged or destroyed in the town of Galatia. The roof of a car wash was blown off, and its walls were collapsed. A trailer was overturned, injuring two people inside. Two brick houses had their roofs and walls ripped away. |
| F3 | NE of Valley Mission to NE of Cypress | Union, Johnson | IL | April 28 | 37.3667°N 89.3333°W | 06:18–06:38 | 19 mi (31 km) | 400 yd (370 m) | 1 death – An intense tornado touched down in the Shawnee National Forest and tracked east into Dongola where it damaged or destroyed 75 houses. One woman attempted to outdrive the tornado but was killed when her car was thrown across the road and under a building. A train was blown off its tracks, and a recreational vehicle was thrown across Lake Dongola and impaled into the ground. In Cypress, two trailers were destroyed. About 50 other structures were damaged, including a school that lost some of its roof and upper-story walls. Ten people were injured. |
| F2 | NW of Ganntown | Johnson | IL | April 28 | 37.3667°N 88.9°W | 06:46–06:52 | 7 mi (11 km) | 400 yd (370 m) | A mobile home was demolished, and its two occupants were injured. Two other mobile homes sustained extensive damage. Numerous trees were downed. |
| F3 | N of Reevesville to SE of Joy, Kentucky | Pope (IL), Livingston (KY) | IL, KY | April 28 | 37.35°N 88.7167°W | 06:59–07:20 | 22 mi (35 km) | 200 yd (180 m) | A brick house and two mobile homes were destroyed, while farm buildings and a few homes were damaged. Thousands of trees were downed. |
| F0 | SE of Hayward | New Madrid | MO | April 28 | 36.35°N 89.6°W | 07:29 | 0.1 mi (0.16 km) | 70 yd (64 m) | Several large trees were snapped at their base. |
| F1 | N of Sheridan | Crittenden | KY | April 28 | 37.3667°N 88.2167°W | 07:35–07:37 | 2 mi (3.2 km) | 100 yd (91 m) | A few trailers were heavily damaged or destroyed. Many trees were downed. |
| F1 | SW of Repton | Crittenden | KY | April 28 | 37.3667°N 88.0333°W | 07:39–07:41 | 1 mi (1.6 km) | 200 yd (180 m) | Numerous trees were downed. |
| F1 | W of Tiptonville | Lake | TN | April 28 | 36.3833°N 89.5°W | 07:40–07:47 | 3.5 mi (5.6 km) | 75 yd (69 m) | Eleven mobile homes and a shed were destroyed. Twelve other mobile homes and five houses were damaged. |
| F3 | SE of Piney to Hanson | Crittenden, Webster, Hopkins | KY | April 28 | 37.3833°N 87.8833°W | 07:49–08:10 | 22 mi (35 km) | 880 yd (800 m) | A long-lived and intense tornado touched down in Crittenden County, where it damaged a dozen houses and farm buildings. Extensive damage occurred in Providence were 16 mobile homes and ten houses were destroyed, and 100 other houses were damaged. In Hopkins County, another ten (as many as 15) houses were significantly damaged and four chicken houses with 45,000 chickens inside them were blown off their foundations. In all, 26 people were injured by this storm and total damages were estimated at $16.9 million. |
| F2+ | SE of Tobinsport, Indiana to SW of Garrett, Kentucky | Perry (IN), Breckinridge (KY), Meade (KY) | IN, KY | April 28 | 37.85°N 86.6333°W | 08:05–08:40 | 32.5 mi (52.3 km) | 150 yd (140 m) | 1 death – Several houses, mobile homes, and outbuildings were destroyed, resulting in one death and 19 injuries. Other structures sustained lesser damage. Numerous trees were uprooted. A church had its roof ripped off. |
| F1 | W of Hartford | Ohio | KY | April 28 | 37.4167°N 87.0833°W | 08:40–08:50 | 9.5 mi (15.3 km) | 100 yd (91 m) | One mobile home and several outbuildings were destroyed. Other mobile homes were lifted and twisted. Sixteen houses in Hartford sustained structural damage with some of their roofs torn off. |
| F1+ | NW of Radcliff | Hardin | KY | April 28 | 37.8333°N 85.9833°W | 08:55–08:57 | 2 mi (3.2 km) | 60 yd (55 m) | Twenty-six houses were damaged, including two that had their roofs torn off. Numerous trees were uprooted. |
| F0 | E of Whitlock | Henry | TN | April 28 | 36.3667°N 88.35°W | 09:00–09:10 | 5 mi (8.0 km) | 50 yd (46 m) | Three tall transmission towers were destroyed, and twenty houses were damaged. Several trees and power lines were toppled. |
| F1 | S of Moutardier | Edmonson | KY | April 28 | 37.3167°N 86.25°W | 09:35–09:38 | 3 mi (4.8 km) | 100 yd (91 m) | Several houses lost their roofs, and 2x4s from structures were impaled into the ground. Numerous trees were snapped or downed. |
| F3 | E of Rucker | Rutherford | TN | April 28 | 35.75°N 86.3667°W | 12:34–12:40 | 3.2 mi (5.1 km) | 350 yd (320 m) | Seven mobile homes, five houses, and two barns were destroyed with two other mobile homes and 46 houses sustaining damage. Six horse/cattle were killed, and 31 people were injured. |
| F2 | S of Bradyville | Cannon | TN | April 28 | 35.7167°N 86.1667°W | 12:45–12:47 | 0.9 mi (1.4 km) | 30 yd (27 m) | One house and three mobile homes were destroyed, and six other mobile homes were damaged. |
| F2 | Crystal Springs to North Canton | Stark | OH | April 28 | 40.85°N 81.5167°W | 17:58–18:08 | 7.2 mi (11.6 km) | 440 yd (400 m) | A strong tornado destroyed 25 structures and three businesses. Another 300 houses and 38 other buildings were damaged. A middle school building suffered extensive damage and was closed for nearly a week for repairs. A nearby high school was also damaged. Approximately 1,000 trees were downed by the tornado and over 300 vehicles were damaged. |
| F0 | Sharpsville | Mercer | PA | April 28 | 41.25°N 80.4667°W | 18:35–18:40 | 6 mi (9.7 km) | 50 yd (46 m) | A fire tower was downed. The windward side of a barn was blown out, and resulting debris punctured large holes in an adjacent building. A garage under construction sustained extensive damage. Numerous trees and telephone poles were toppled or snapped with some falling trees landing on homes. |
| F1 | NW of Jackson Center to W of Mapledale | Mercer, Venango | PA | April 28 | 41.28°N 80.1667°W | 18:45–19:06 | 16 mi (26 km) | 200 yd (180 m) | Several decks, porches, signs, and a relatively new garage were significantly damaged. Some sheds, small garages, and houses lost their roofs, siding, or shingles. Numerous large trees, power lines, and telephones were toppled, some onto houses. A fish hatchery building had about 100 square feet (9.3 m^{2}) of its metal roof torn off and thrown several hundred yards. A wooden 2x4 was driven through a mobile home, while pieces of wood were also driven into the front of a nearby car. Thousands of trees were snapped or uprooted. Microburst damage accompanied the tornado as it approached Venango County where four barns were destroyed, one house was moderately damaged, and three houses saw minor damage. Two tree farms sustained extensive damage, and a double-wide mobile home was overturned onto its roof. |
| F0 | NE of Springville | Erie | NY | April 28 | 42.55°N 78.6333°W | 18:50 | 0.7 mi (1.1 km) | 25 yd (23 m) | The roof and back wall of an outbuilding were blown out, a pier was tossed across a pond, and trees were damaged. |
| F1 | W of Meridian | Butler | PA | April 28 | 40.85°N 80.0667°W | 19:01–19:06 | 7 mi (11 km) | 50 yd (46 m) | Several houses and a barn sustained roof or siding damage, including the roof of a house that was thrown 75 yards (69 m). Large swaths of trees were snapped or uprooted. |
| F1 | N of St. Joseph | Marshall | WV | April 28 | 39.7333°N 80.7167°W | 19:15–19:20 | 1 mi (1.6 km) | 150 yd (140 m) | One barn was destroyed and several others were damaged. Shingles were ripped off a house. Numerous trees were downed or snapped. |
| F0 | NW of Maysville | Armstrong, Indiana | PA | April 28 | 40.58°N 79.4833°W | 19:45–19:55 | 4 mi (6.4 km) | 150 yd (140 m) | A church steeple was toppled, and a swimming pool was destroyed. Some houses sustained damage from tornadic winds or fallen trees. A garage was also damaged while a house under construction was lifted from its foundation. |
| F2 | SE of Belfast | Allegany | NY | April 28 | 42.3333°N 78.1167°W | 19:50–20:00 | 6.5 mi (10.5 km) | 300 yd (270 m) | A barn, garage, and a two-story house were destroyed. A silo, a barn, and another house were damaged. |
| F2 | Indiana area | Indiana | PA | April 28 | 40.5667°N 79.2333°W | 20:00–20:06 | 5 mi (8.0 km) | 250 yd (230 m) | One house was destroyed while at least eighteen others were damaged. Some garages and barns were also damaged, and a large sign from a hotel was blown into a car lot, crushing two cars and damaging many others. One person was injured. |
| F1 | NE of Deckers Point | Indiana | PA | April 28 | 40.7667°N 78.9667°W | 20:10–20:13 | 2 mi (3.2 km) | 100 yd (91 m) | One house had its doors blown in, its opposite wall pushed outward, and its roof uplifted. A 100-year-old home lost its entire roof, which was thrown nearly 150 yards (140 m), and its garage was also destroyed with cinder blocks thrown nearly 100 yards (91 m). Numerous trees, power lines, and telephone poles were downed. Several sheds and small garages were damaged or destroyed, including one wooden garage that was picked up over the car inside. One person was injured. |
| F1 | Bedford | Bedford | VA | April 28 | 37.3333°N 79.5333°W | 20:31–20:32 | 0.5 mi (0.80 km) | 100 yd (91 m) | Four businesses were destroyed. Twenty-five homes, 58 businesses, several dozen cars, and one church were damaged. |
| F0 | Mount Pleasant | Maury | TN | April 28 | 35.5333°N 87.2°W | 20:42 | 0.1 mi (0.16 km) | 10 yd (9.1 m) | A trained storm spotter reported a brief tornado. |
| F2 | Bedford | Bedford, Campbell | VA | April 28 | 37.2833°N 79.4°W | 20:43–20:57 | 10 mi (16 km) | 150 yd (140 m) | A second, stronger tornado struck the Bedford area, destroying 22 houses, six businesses, 24 farm buildings, and one church. Another 329 houses, several RV vehicles, 45 businesses, and two churches were damaged. Many trees and power lines were downed, and a “semi-truck” was damaged as well. Twelve people were injured. |
| F2 | N of Alpine | Shenandoah | VA | April 28 | 38.67°N 78.6667°W | 20:55–21:03 | 4 mi (6.4 km) | 75 yd (69 m) | A strong tornado destroyed four houses, while another 36 agricultural structures and 56 houses were damaged. A tractor-trailer was overturned on Interstate 81. Two people were injured. |
| F1 | S of Jerseytown | Columbia | PA | April 28 | 41.0833°N 76.5833°W | 21:55–22:05 | 6 mi (9.7 km) | 30 yd (27 m) | Unknown damage occurred. |
| F1 | N of McGillstown | Lebanon | PA | April 28 | 40.4°N 76.5333°W | 22:13–22:18 | 1.5 mi (2.4 km) | 150 yd (140 m) | A tornado damaged or destroyed 12 houses and 15 barns. Dozens of large trees were affected as well. |
| F4 | Rison to SE of Port Republic | Charles, Calvert | MD | April 28 | 38.55°N 77.1833°W | 22:56–23:49 | 38 mi (61 km) | 650 yd (590 m) | 3 deaths – See article on this tornado |
| F2 | La Plata | Charles | MD | April 28 | 38.5333°N 76.9833°W | 23:02–23:06 | 3 mi (4.8 km) | 100 yd (91 m) | A weaker, but still strong F2 tornado affected La Plata with unknown additional damage. |
| F1 | W of Emporia | Greensville | VA | April 28 | 36.7°N 77.5833°W | 23:35 | 6 mi (9.7 km) | 150 yd (140 m) | Three mobile homes were destroyed and fifty houses, one business, and an apartment complex were damaged. Numerous trees were snapped and uprooted. Three people were injured. |
| F1 | NE of St. Leonard | Calvert | MD | April 28 | 38.4667°N 76.4833°W | 23:42–23:49 | 5 mi (8.0 km) | 50 yd (46 m) | Unknown damage occurred. |
| F3 | NW of Golden Hill to W of Royal Oak | Dorchester | MD | April 28 | 38.42°N 76.3°W | 23:55 | 18 mi (29 km) | 150 yd (140 m) | One house and several outbuildings were destroyed. |
| F0 | SE of Wetipquin | Wicomico | MD | April 28 | 38.33°N 75.8333°W | 00:28 | 4 mi (6.4 km) | 100 yd (91 m) | Numerous trees were snapped or sheared off. |

== See also ==
- Weather of 2002
- List of North American tornadoes and tornado outbreaks
- List of F4 and EF4 tornadoes
  - List of F4 and EF4 tornadoes (2000–2009)
