= Pleasant Grove, Illinois =

- Unincorporated community
- Location within Illinois Location within the United States
- Coordinates: 37°26′27″N 89°01′47″W
- Country: United States
- State: Illinois
- County: Johnson
- Elevation: 440 ft (130 m)
- Time zone: UTC-6 (Central (CST))
  - Summer (DST): UTC-5 (CDT)
- Area code: 618
- GNIS feature ID: 423071

Pleasant Grove is an unincorporated community in Johnson County, Illinois, United States. Pleasant Grove is located along Illinois Route 146, 3.5 miles (5.6 km) southwest of Buncombe.
