= 1968 United States presidential election in Illinois =

- November 5, 1968
- Turnout: 81.39%

Nominee	Richard Nixon	Hubert Humphrey	George Wallace
Party	Republican	Democratic	Independent
Alliance			American Independent
Home state	New York (Note: Although he was born in California and he served as a U.S. senator from California, in 1968 Richard Nixon's official state of residence was New York, because he moved there to practice law after his defeat in the 1962 California gubernatorial election. During his first term as president, Nixon re-established his residency in California. Consequently, most reliable reference books list Nixon's home state as New York in the 1968 election and his home state as California in the 1972 (and 1960) election.)	Minnesota	Alabama
Running mate	Spiro Agnew	Edmund Muskie	Curtis LeMay
Electoral vote	26	0	0
Popular vote	2,174,774	2,039,814	390,958
Percentage	47.08%	44.15%	8.46%
County results
Nixon
40–50%
50–60%
60–70%
70–80%
Humphrey
40–50%
50–60%
President before election
Lyndon B. Johnson
Democratic
Elected President
Richard Nixon
Republican

The 1968 United States presidential election in Illinois took place on November 5, 1968, as part of the overall 1968 United States presidential election. Illinois voters selected 26 electors to represent the state in the Electoral College, which would then choose the president and vice president.

Illinois had been consistently Republican during the "System of 1896," with the exception of a few areas in the southern part of the state that sympathized with the Confederacy during the American Civil War. However, starting from the New Deal era, Illinois became a crucial swing state, having voted for the winner of every presidential election since 1920.

Like other states in the Midwest, Illinois had been severely affected by racial tension during the presidency of Lyndon Johnson. This situation played a role in Charles H. Percy's comfortable Senate win, as he defeated Democrat Paul Douglas. Illinois, particularly the Metro East region, was affected less by racial tension compared to states located to its east.

By the time the election campaign was in full swing at the end of the summer, Democratic nominee and incumbent Vice President Hubert Humphrey was clearly in serious trouble, and early polling suggested he would have little chance in the state. Humphrey was further hindered by the refusal of Chicago Mayor Richard Daley Sr. to help him.

The failure of Nixon's "50 State Strategy" in 1960 led him to focus on a few electoral-vote-rich states, of which Illinois was one of the most critical. Humphrey lost further in polling during September, and at the end of the first week of October Nixon had a substantial lead. Nevertheless, when the vice president campaigned alongside rival former and future Alabama Governor George Wallace, he would gain sharply so that state became extremely close at the beginning of November.

== Primaries ==
=== Turnout ===
Turnout in the preference vote of the primaries was 0.67%, with a total of 34,241 votes cast. Turnout in the general election was 81.39%, with a total of 4,619,749 votes cast. Both major parties held non-binding state-run preferential primaries on June 11. All candidates were write-ins.

=== Democratic ===
1968 Illinois Democratic presidential primary
- June 11, 1968
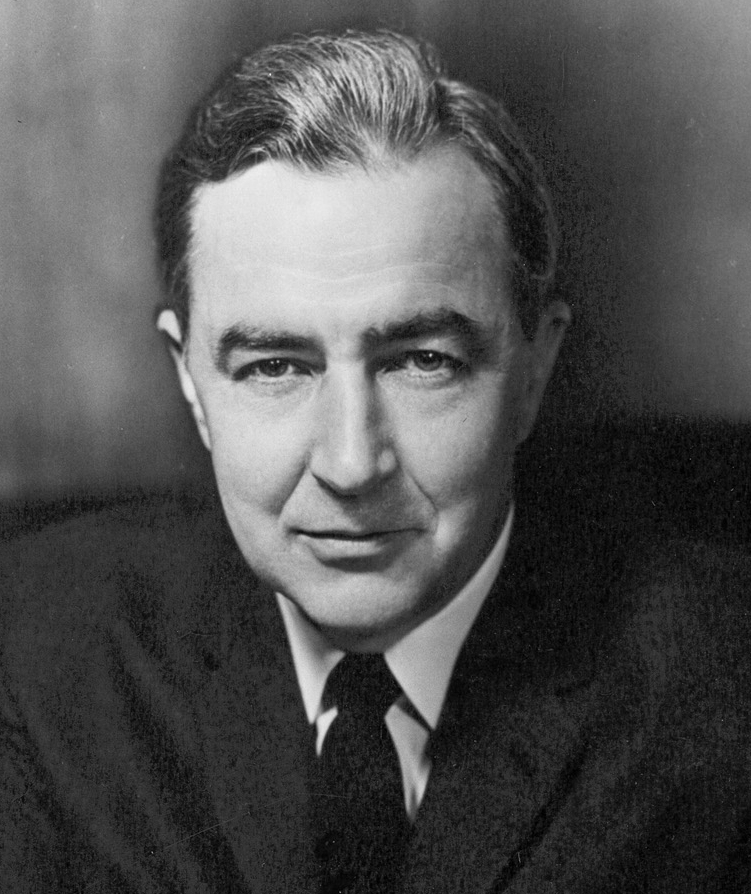

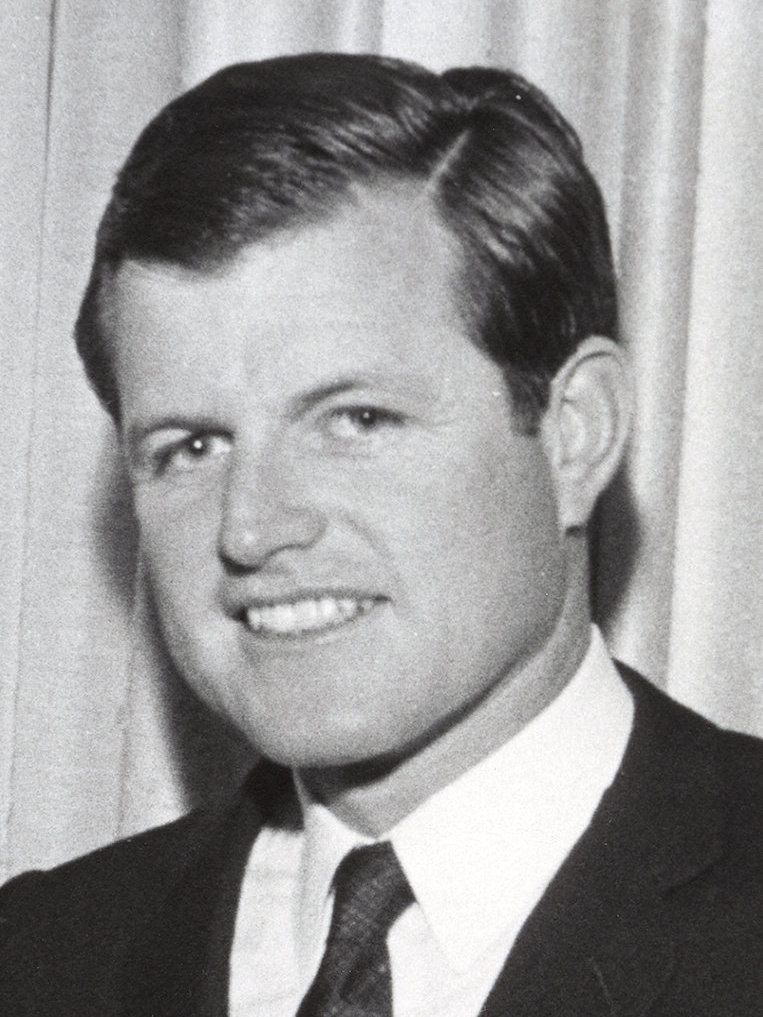

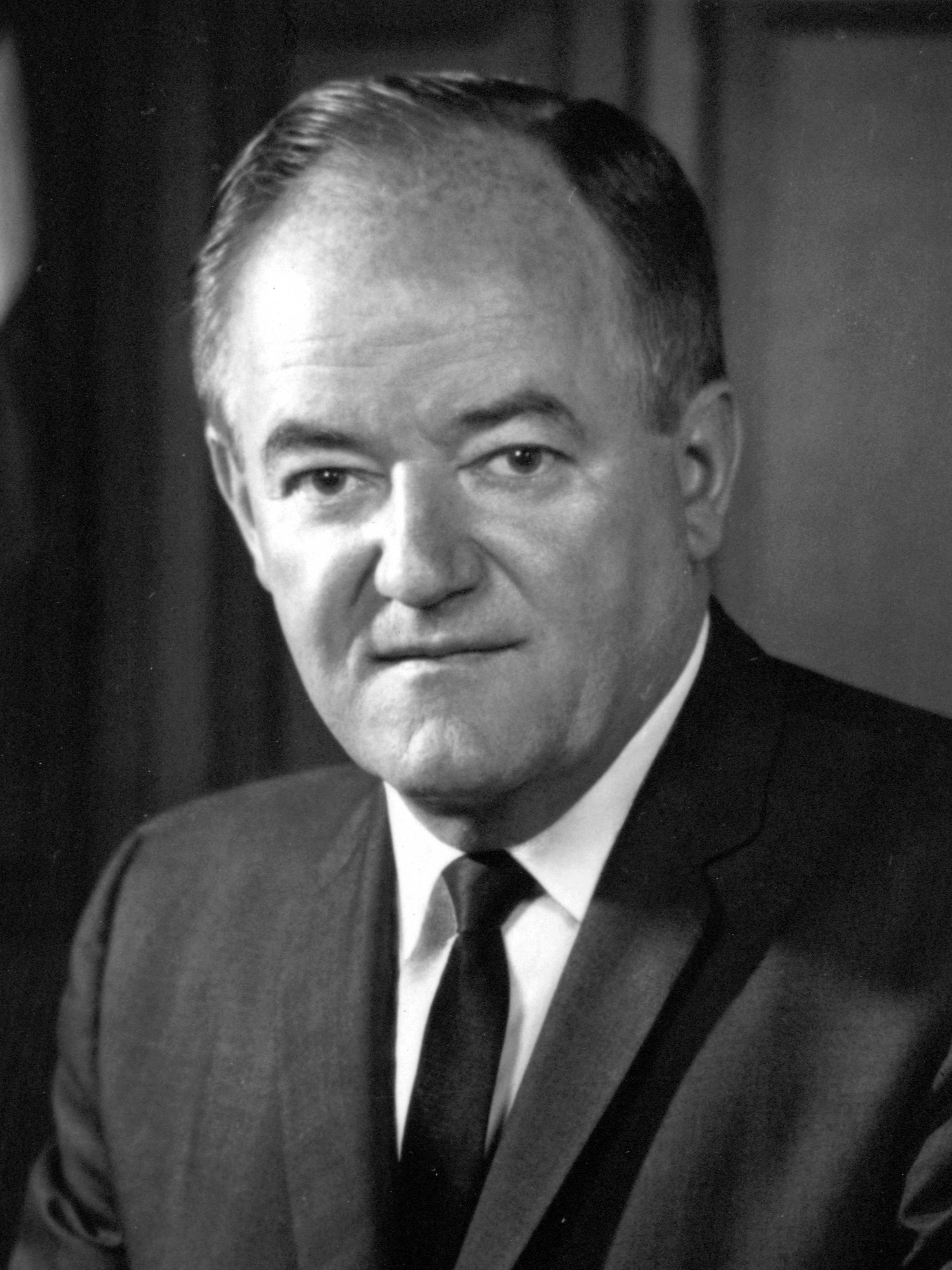

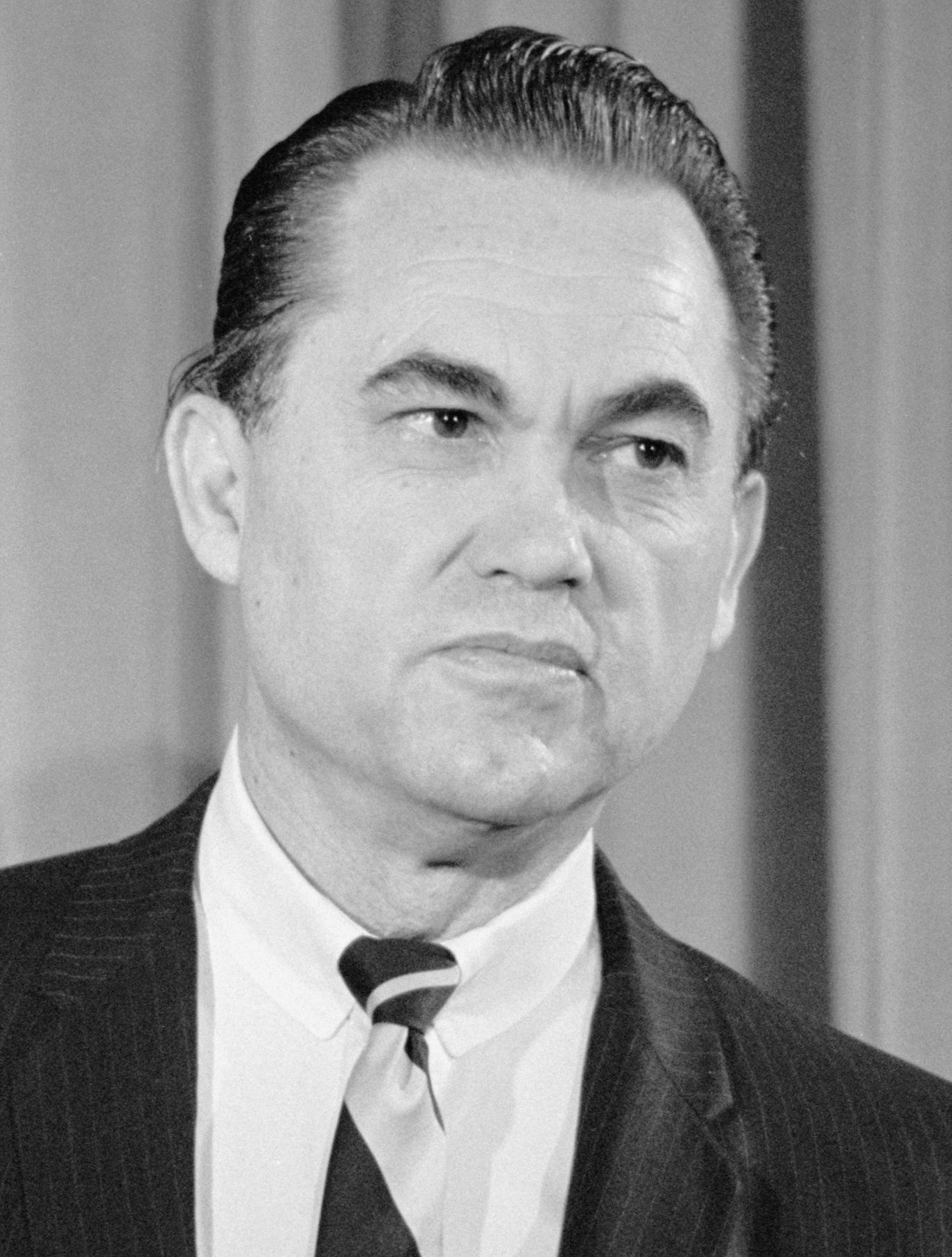
Candidate	Eugene McCarthy	Ted Kennedy	Hubert Humphrey
Home state	Minnesota	Massachusetts	Minnesota
Popular vote	4,646	4,052	2,059
Percentage	38.60%	33.66%	17.10%
Candidate	George Wallace
Home state	Alabama
Popular vote	768
Percentage	6.38%

The 1968 Illinois Democratic presidential primary was held on June 11, 1968, in the U.S. state of Illinois as one of the Democratic Party's state primaries ahead of the 1968 presidential election.

The preference vote was a "beauty contest". Delegates were instead selected by direct vote in each congressional districts on delegate candidates. While he received 33.66% of the vote, Ted Kennedy was not an active candidate for the nomination. The primary occurred the week after his brother Robert F. Kennedy (who had been running for president) was assassinated. Additionally, while he still received some votes, incumbent president Lyndon B. Johnson had already ruled himself out for the nomination.

1968 Illinois Democratic presidential primary
Candidate	Votes	%
Eugene McCarthy (write-in)	4,646	38.60
Edward Kennedy (write-in)	4,052	33.66
Hubert H. Humphrey (write-in)	2,059	17.10
George Wallace (write-in)	768	6.38
Lyndon B. Johnson (write-in)	162	1.35
Other write-ins	351	2.92
Total	12,038	100

=== Republican ===
1968 Illinois Republican presidential primary
- June 11, 1968
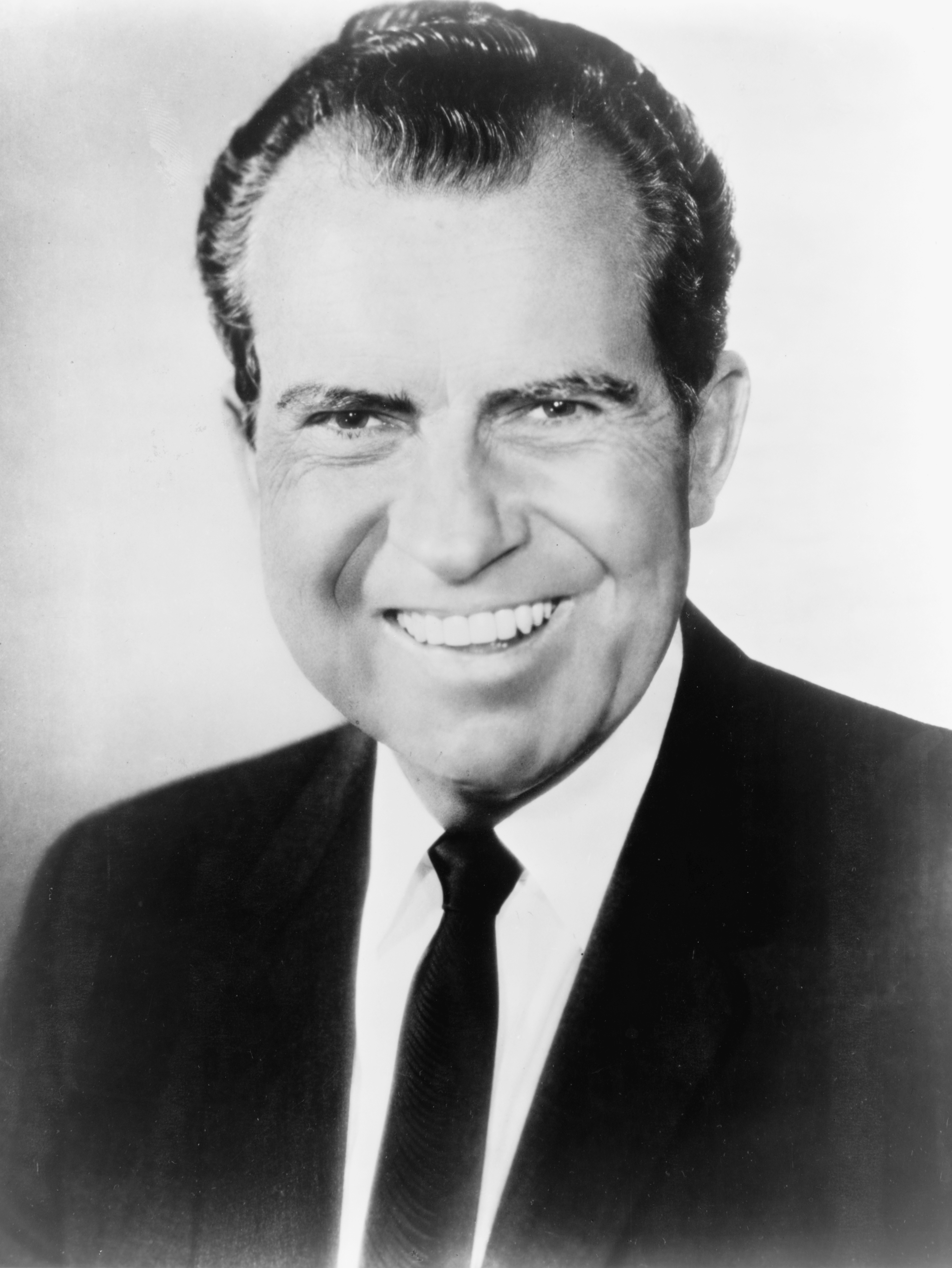

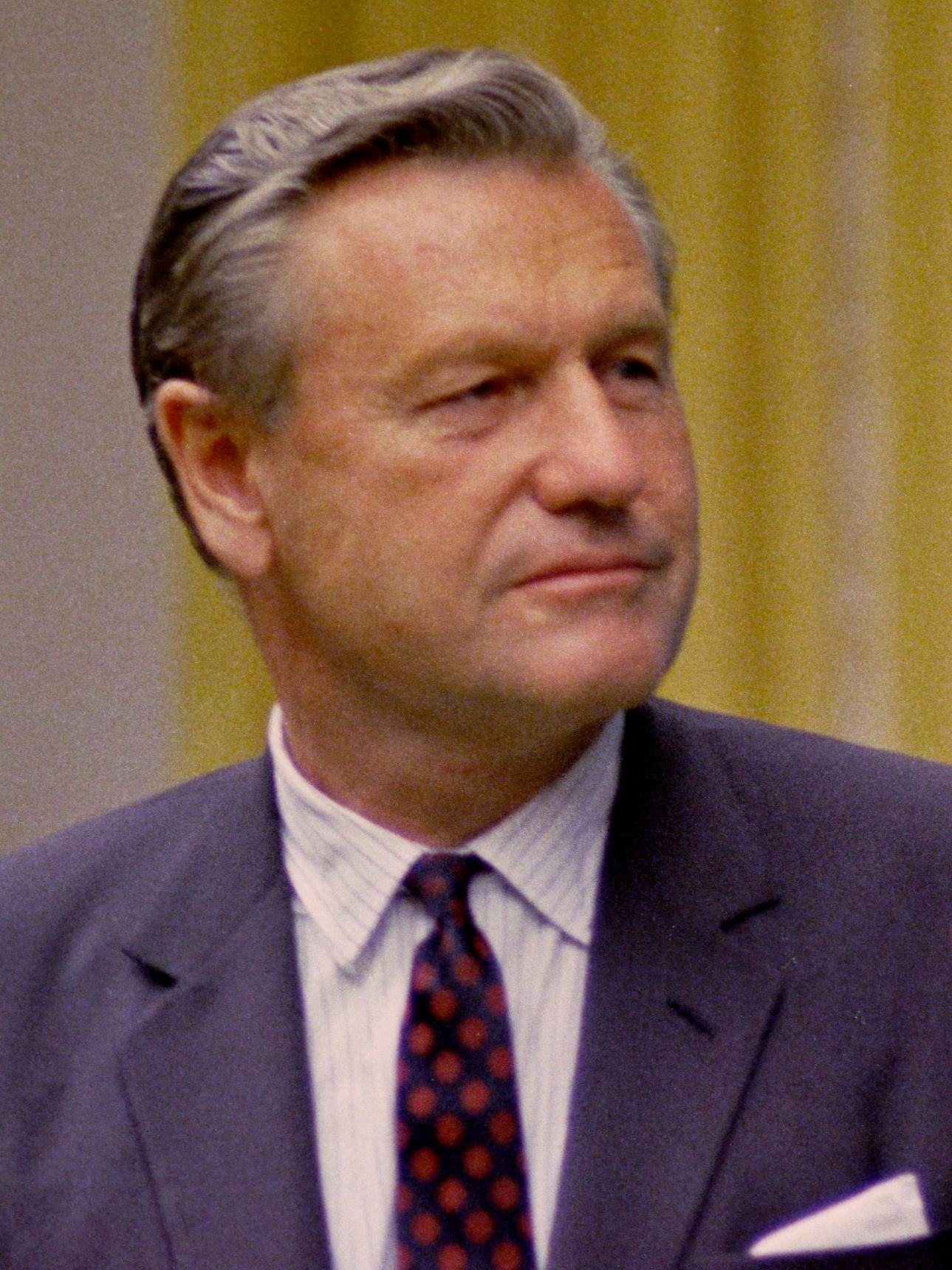

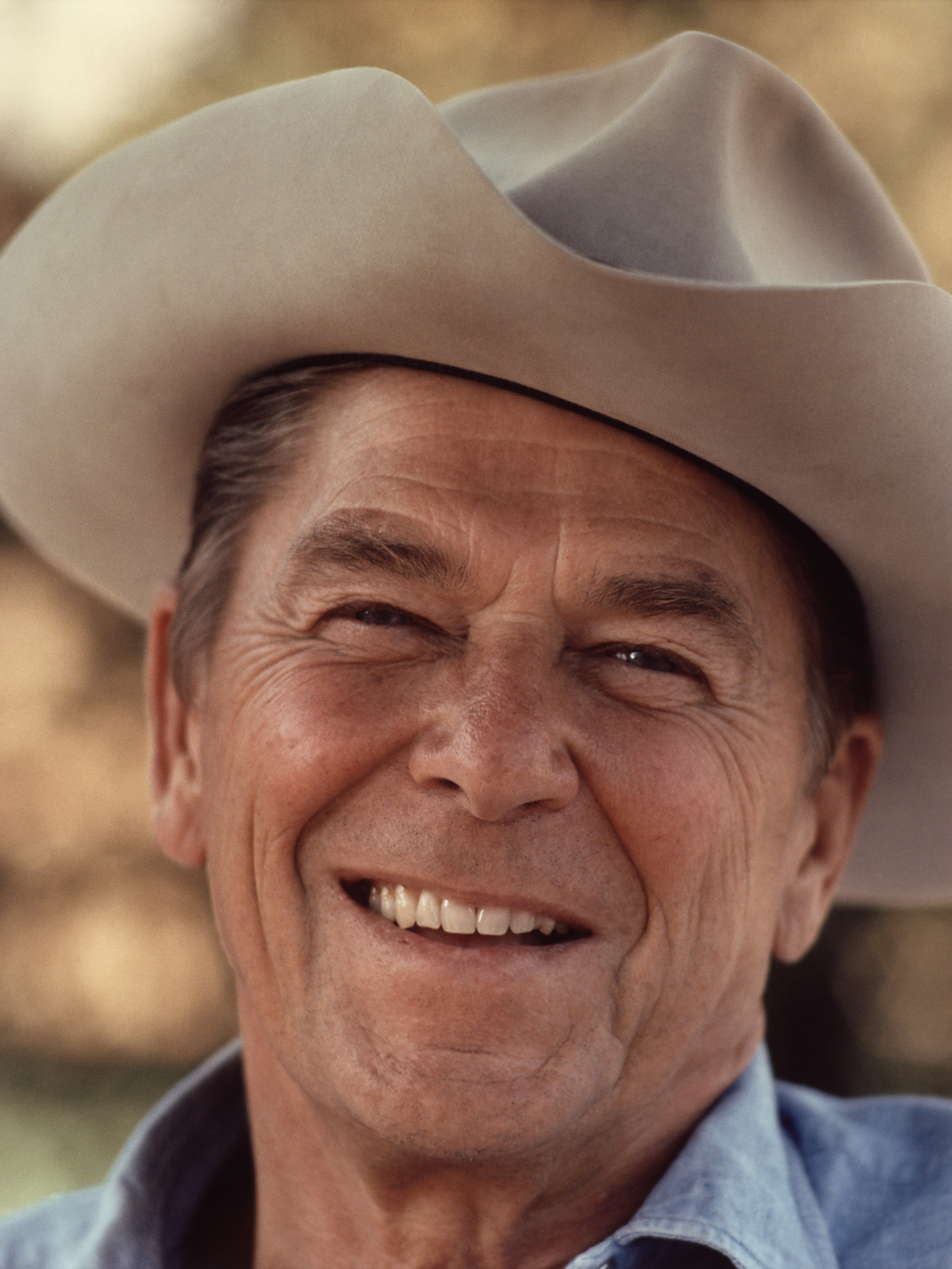
Candidate	Richard Nixon	Nelson Rockefeller	Ronald Reagan
Home state	California	New York	California
Popular vote	17,490	2,165	1,601
Percentage	78.77%	9.75%	7.21%

The 1968 Illinois Republican presidential primary was held on June 11, 1968, in the U.S. state of Illinois as one of the Republican Party's state primaries ahead of the 1968 presidential election.

In this election, all candidates were write-ins.

The preference vote was a "beauty contest". Delegates were instead selected by direct vote in each congressional districts on delegate candidates.

1968 Illinois Republican presidential primary
Candidate	Votes	%
Richard M. Nixon (write-in)	17,490	78.77
Nelson A. Rockefeller (write-in)	2,165	9.75
Ronald Reagan (write-in)	1,601	7.21
George Wallace (write-in)	386	1.74
Eugene McCarthy (write-in)	162	0.73
Charles Percy (write-in)	120	0.54
George Romney (write-in)	16	0.07
Other write-ins	263	1.19
Total	22,203	100

== Results ==
Presidential Candidate	Running Mate	Party	Electoral Vote (EV)	Popular Vote (PV)	
Richard Nixon	Spiro Agnew	Republican	26	2,174,774	47.08%
Hubert Humphrey	Edmund Muskie	Democratic	0	2,039,814	44.15%
George Wallace	Curtis LeMay	Independent	0	390,958	8.46%
Henning Blomen	George Taylor	Socialist Labor	0	13,878	0.30%
Write-ins	—	—	0	325	0.01%

=== Results by county ===
County	Richard Nixon Republican		Hubert Humphrey Democratic		George Wallace Independent		Various candidates Other parties		Margin		Total votes cast
County	#	%	#	%	#	%	#	%	#	%	Total votes cast
Adams	17,444	54.33%	11,521	35.88%	3,115	9.70%	28	0.09%	5,923	18.45%	32,108
Alexander	2,540	36.63%	2,929	42.24%	1,443	20.81%	22	0.32%	-389	-5.61%	6,934
Bond	3,674	52.84%	2,516	36.19%	758	10.90%	5	0.07%	1,158	16.65%	6,953
Boone	5,936	62.27%	2,801	29.38%	783	8.21%	13	0.14%	3,135	32.89%	9,533
Brown	1,629	51.50%	1,265	39.99%	247	7.81%	22	0.70%	364	11.51%	3,163
Bureau	11,216	59.97%	6,304	33.71%	1,171	6.26%	12	0.06%	4,912	26.26%	18,703
Calhoun	1,542	49.12%	1,329	42.34%	266	8.47%	2	0.06%	213	6.78%	3,139
Carroll	5,275	63.69%	2,558	30.89%	440	5.31%	9	0.11%	2,717	32.80%	8,282
Cass	3,411	47.78%	3,302	46.25%	424	5.94%	2	0.03%	109	1.53%	7,139
Champaign	26,027	53.50%	18,425	37.87%	3,857	7.93%	339	0.70%	7,602	15.63%	48,648
Christian	7,486	42.31%	8,465	47.84%	1,730	9.78%	13	0.07%	-979	-5.53%	17,694
Clark	4,809	56.08%	2,813	32.80%	949	11.07%	4	0.05%	1,996	23.28%	8,575
Clay	4,429	55.46%	2,878	36.04%	672	8.41%	7	0.09%	1,551	19.42%	7,986
Clinton	6,561	53.78%	4,453	36.50%	1,180	9.67%	5	0.04%	2,108	17.28%	12,199
Coles	10,449	52.86%	7,337	37.12%	1,973	9.98%	7	0.04%	3,112	15.74%	19,766
Cook	960,493	41.11%	1,181,316	50.56%	186,921	8.00%	7,808	0.33%	-220,823	-9.45%	2,336,538
Crawford	5,870	58.13%	3,383	33.50%	840	8.32%	5	0.05%	2,487	24.63%	10,098
Cumberland	2,671	53.12%	1,828	36.36%	512	10.18%	17	0.34%	843	16.76%	5,028
DeKalb	14,535	63.20%	6,974	30.32%	1,238	5.38%	252	1.10%	7,561	32.88%	22,999
DeWitt	4,247	54.21%	2,823	36.04%	759	9.69%	5	0.06%	1,424	18.17%	7,834
Douglas	5,058	59.25%	2,824	33.08%	651	7.63%	4	0.05%	2,234	26.17%	8,537
DuPage	124,893	66.61%	48,492	25.86%	13,814	7.37%	297	0.16%	76,401	40.75%	187,496
Edgar	6,281	56.33%	3,565	31.97%	1,292	11.59%	13	0.12%	2,716	24.36%	11,151
Edwards	2,633	63.68%	1,095	26.48%	403	9.75%	4	0.10%	1,538	37.20%	4,135
Effingham	6,698	55.95%	4,496	37.55%	777	6.49%	1	0.01%	2,202	18.40%	11,972
Fayette	5,449	52.38%	4,011	38.56%	939	9.03%	4	0.04%	1,438	13.82%	10,403
Ford	5,233	65.38%	2,216	27.69%	550	6.87%	5	0.06%	3,017	37.69%	8,004
Franklin	9,036	42.88%	10,095	47.90%	1,930	9.16%	13	0.06%	-1,059	-5.02%	21,074
Fulton	9,582	46.72%	9,622	46.92%	1,234	6.02%	71	0.35%	-40	-0.20%	20,509
Gallatin	1,802	43.01%	1,980	47.26%	404	9.64%	4	0.10%	-178	-4.25%	4,190
Greene	3,944	51.17%	3,094	40.14%	660	8.56%	10	0.13%	850	11.03%	7,708
Grundy	6,607	59.50%	3,407	30.68%	1,085	9.77%	6	0.05%	3,200	28.82%	11,105
Hamilton	2,912	52.82%	1,951	35.39%	643	11.66%	7	0.13%	961	17.43%	5,513
Hancock	6,866	60.24%	3,720	32.64%	806	7.07%	5	0.04%	3,146	27.60%	11,397
Hardin	1,492	51.75%	1,199	41.59%	187	6.49%	5	0.17%	293	10.16%	2,883
Henderson	2,224	53.62%	1,635	39.42%	288	6.94%	1	0.02%	589	14.20%	4,148
Henry	12,524	55.10%	8,455	37.20%	1,725	7.59%	27	0.12%	4,069	17.90%	22,731
Iroquois	10,885	67.89%	3,897	24.31%	1,225	7.64%	26	0.16%	6,988	43.58%	16,033
Jackson	9,134	46.47%	8,856	45.05%	1,645	8.37%	22	0.11%	278	1.42%	19,657
Jasper	2,944	51.78%	2,012	35.39%	728	12.80%	2	0.04%	932	16.39%	5,686
Jefferson	7,367	47.63%	6,476	41.87%	1,612	10.42%	12	0.08%	891	5.76%	15,467
Jersey	3,806	46.81%	3,350	41.21%	971	11.94%	3	0.04%	456	5.60%	8,130
Jo Daviess	5,563	59.13%	3,228	34.31%	607	6.45%	10	0.11%	2,335	24.82%	9,408
Johnson	2,406	60.53%	1,143	28.75%	421	10.59%	5	0.13%	1,263	31.78%	3,975
Kane	54,144	61.94%	26,609	30.44%	6,340	7.25%	327	0.37%	27,535	31.50%	87,420
Kankakee	20,025	52.35%	14,460	37.80%	3,735	9.76%	30	0.08%	5,565	14.55%	38,250
Kendall	7,184	70.45%	2,228	21.85%	780	7.65%	6	0.06%	4,956	48.60%	10,198
Knox	14,216	53.86%	9,707	36.77%	2,394	9.07%	79	0.30%	4,509	17.09%	26,396
Lake	68,999	56.60%	43,409	35.61%	8,738	7.17%	757	0.62%	25,590	20.99%	121,903
LaSalle	26,054	50.48%	22,940	44.45%	2,590	5.02%	26	0.05%	3,114	6.03%	51,610
Lawrence	4,883	54.58%	3,075	34.37%	972	10.87%	16	0.18%	1,808	20.21%	8,946
Lee	9,598	62.92%	4,727	30.99%	925	6.06%	5	0.03%	4,871	31.93%	15,255
Livingston	11,963	65.88%	5,234	28.82%	950	5.23%	13	0.07%	6,729	37.06%	18,160
Logan	8,638	60.45%	4,552	31.86%	1,083	7.58%	16	0.11%	4,086	28.59%	14,289
Macon	21,027	42.27%	23,369	46.98%	5,163	10.38%	182	0.37%	-2,342	-4.71%	49,741
Macoupin	10,262	43.91%	10,750	46.00%	2,325	9.95%	31	0.13%	-488	-2.09%	23,368
Madison	39,622	39.18%	46,384	45.87%	14,987	14.82%	136	0.13%	-6,762	-6.69%	101,129
Marion	8,134	46.09%	7,737	43.84%	1,680	9.52%	98	0.56%	397	2.25%	17,649
Marshall	3,897	58.36%	2,455	36.77%	313	4.69%	12	0.18%	1,442	21.59%	6,677
Mason	3,899	49.65%	3,365	42.85%	572	7.28%	17	0.22%	534	6.80%	7,853
Massac	3,578	55.51%	1,934	30.00%	926	14.37%	8	0.12%	1,644	25.51%	6,446
McDonough	8,496	65.74%	3,785	29.29%	628	4.86%	15	0.12%	4,711	36.45%	12,924
McHenry	27,245	66.15%	10,896	26.46%	2,701	6.56%	343	0.83%	16,349	39.69%	41,185
McLean	22,284	59.22%	12,779	33.96%	2,351	6.25%	216	0.57%	9,505	25.26%	37,630
Menard	2,980	59.66%	1,640	32.83%	372	7.45%	3	0.06%	1,340	26.83%	4,995
Mercer	4,844	56.33%	3,143	36.55%	607	7.06%	6	0.07%	1,701	19.78%	8,600
Monroe	5,086	55.48%	2,822	30.78%	1,253	13.67%	6	0.07%	2,264	24.70%	9,167
Montgomery	7,547	46.19%	7,318	44.79%	1,468	8.98%	6	0.04%	229	1.40%	16,339
Morgan	8,902	54.52%	6,281	38.47%	1,137	6.96%	7	0.04%	2,621	16.05%	16,327
Moultrie	3,094	50.50%	2,447	39.94%	571	9.32%	15	0.24%	647	10.56%	6,127
Ogle	12,168	68.98%	4,399	24.94%	1,060	6.01%	14	0.08%	7,769	44.04%	17,641
Peoria	37,021	49.96%	30,937	41.75%	5,648	7.62%	499	0.67%	6,084	8.21%	74,105
Perry	5,384	49.02%	4,449	40.51%	1,144	10.42%	6	0.05%	935	8.51%	10,983
Piatt	3,973	56.28%	2,447	34.66%	636	9.01%	3	0.04%	1,526	21.62%	7,059
Pike	5,035	50.66%	4,191	42.17%	697	7.01%	16	0.16%	844	8.49%	9,939
Pope	1,307	57.63%	732	32.28%	226	9.96%	3	0.13%	575	25.35%	2,268
Pulaski	1,741	37.59%	2,076	44.82%	815	17.59%	0	0.00%	-335	-7.23%	4,632
Putnam	1,351	53.93%	988	39.44%	162	6.47%	4	0.16%	363	14.49%	2,505
Randolph	7,681	50.37%	5,953	39.04%	1,607	10.54%	9	0.06%	1,728	11.33%	15,250
Richland	4,781	58.76%	2,495	30.66%	853	10.48%	8	0.10%	2,286	28.10%	8,137
Rock Island	30,404	43.35%	34,506	49.20%	5,054	7.21%	176	0.25%	-4,102	-5.85%	70,140
Saline	6,913	49.92%	5,985	43.22%	939	6.78%	12	0.09%	928	6.70%	13,849
Sangamon	36,510	50.02%	29,542	40.47%	6,586	9.02%	358	0.49%	6,968	9.55%	72,996
Schuyler	2,760	60.00%	1,475	32.07%	346	7.52%	19	0.41%	1,285	27.93%	4,600
Scott	1,971	55.55%	1,252	35.29%	325	9.16%	0	0.00%	719	20.26%	3,548
Shelby	5,487	49.27%	4,528	40.66%	1,115	10.01%	7	0.06%	959	8.61%	11,137
St. Clair	34,442	34.14%	50,726	50.29%	15,260	15.13%	446	0.44%	-16,284	-16.15%	100,874
Stark	2,292	62.54%	1,128	30.78%	239	6.52%	6	0.16%	1,164	31.76%	3,665
Stephenson	11,821	59.32%	7,040	35.33%	1,050	5.27%	17	0.09%	4,781	23.99%	19,928
Tazewell	22,971	47.44%	20,712	42.77%	4,711	9.73%	28	0.06%	2,259	4.67%	48,422
Union	3,889	46.45%	3,603	43.04%	871	10.40%	9	0.11%	286	3.41%	8,372
Vermilion	21,391	49.26%	16,238	37.39%	5,726	13.19%	69	0.16%	5,153	11.87%	43,424
Wabash	3,529	55.21%	2,244	35.11%	614	9.61%	5	0.08%	1,285	20.10%	6,392
Warren	5,877	60.00%	3,085	31.50%	824	8.41%	9	0.09%	2,792	28.50%	9,795
Washington	4,793	63.32%	2,093	27.65%	671	8.87%	12	0.16%	2,700	35.67%	7,569
Wayne	5,532	59.59%	2,993	32.24%	745	8.02%	14	0.15%	2,539	27.35%	9,284
White	5,351	53.77%	3,837	38.56%	761	7.65%	3	0.03%	1,514	15.21%	9,952
Whiteside	15,177	61.86%	8,132	33.15%	1,179	4.81%	46	0.19%	7,045	28.71%	24,534
Will	43,630	49.32%	31,576	35.70%	12,595	14.24%	659	0.74%	12,054	13.62%	88,460
Williamson	11,886	50.39%	9,660	40.95%	2,031	8.61%	11	0.05%	2,226	9.44%	23,588
Winnebago	47,646	52.51%	36,702	40.45%	6,176	6.81%	215	0.24%	10,944	12.06%	90,739
Woodford	7,876	61.79%	4,005	31.42%	856	6.72%	10	0.08%	3,871	30.37%	12,747
Totals	2,174,774	47.08%	2,039,814	44.15%	390,958	8.46%	14,203	0.31%	134,960	2.93%	4,619,749

==== Counties that flipped from Democratic to Republican ====
- Bond
- Cass
- Clinton
- Coles
- Fayette
- Greene
- Hamilton
- Hancock
- Hardin
- Jefferson
- Jersey
- Jo Daviess
- Kankakee
- Marion
- Marshall
- Mason
- Moultrie
- Piatt
- Pike
- Randolph
- Saline
- Schuyler
- Shelby
- Union
- Vermilion
- Will
- Williamson
- Winnebago
- Henry
- LaSalle
- Montgomery
- Perry
- Stephenson
- Adams
- Brown
- Cumberland
- Crawford
- DeWitt
- Douglas
- Edgar
- Logan
- Menard
- Mercer
- Monroe
- Morgan
- Peoria
- Putnam
- Sangamon
- Scott
- Tazewell
- Calhoun
- Henderson
- Knox
- Champaign
- Clark
- Clay
- Effingham
- Lake
- Lawrence
- Jackson
- Jasper
- Massac
- McLean
- Richland
- Wabash
- Wayne
- White

== Analysis ==
Republican candidate Richard Nixon won the state of Illinois by a narrow margin of 2.93%. The winning of Illinois was the moment that sealed a close and turbulent election for Nixon, who in the last counting did much better in massively populated Cook County than Goldwater or Nixon himself in 1960.

Nixon won ninety of Illinois' 102 counties, with Humphrey winning only Cook and St. Clair Counties with absolute majorities, although he carried several other Metro East and southern Illinois counties where he was helped by the backing of unions and a strong vote for Wallace taking much of Nixon's support. Wallace's segregationism also went down very poorly in many cities of that latter urban region.

Nixon's victory was the first of six consecutive Republican victories in the state, as Illinois would not vote for a Democratic candidate again until Bill Clinton in 1992, after which it has always gone Democratic. Nixon became the first ever Republican to win the White House without carrying Rock Island County, as well as the first to do so without carrying Macon County since Abraham Lincoln in 1860, the first to do so without carrying Pulaski County since Ulysses S. Grant in 1868, the first to do so without carrying Alexander or Cook Counties since Rutherford B. Hayes in 1876, the first to do so without carrying Fulton County since Benjamin Harrison in 1888, and the first to do so without carrying Christian County since William Howard Taft in 1908.

Humphrey carried the city of Chicago with 874,113 votes to Nixon's 452,914 votes, while Wallace received 105,655 votes in the city.

== See also ==
- United States presidential elections in Illinois
