= Elvira, Illinois =

- Unincorporated community
- Location within Illinois Location within the United States
- Coordinates: 37.4934°N 89.0295°W
- Country: United States
- State: Illinois
- County: Johnson
- Elevation: 453 ft (138 m)
- Time zone: UTC-6 (Central (CST))
  - Summer (DST): UTC-5 (CDT)
- ZIP code: 62912
- Area code: 618
- GNIS feature ID: 422667

Elvira is an unincorporated community in Johnson County, Illinois, United States. The closest city to Elvira is Buncombe, which is about 3 miles (4.8 km) to the southeast. No numbered highways pass through Elvira; the closest state highway is Illinois Route 37, to the east.

== History ==
Elvira was the county seat of Johnson County before Vienna, the current county seat.
