= Grantsburg, Illinois =

- Unincorporated community
- Location within Illinois Location within the United States
- Coordinates: 37°23′27″N 88°44′49″W
- Country: United States
- State: Illinois
- County: Johnson
- Elevation: 367 ft (112 m)
- Time zone: UTC-6 (Central (CST))
  - Summer (DST): UTC-5 (CDT)
- ZIP code: 62943
- Area code: 618
- GNIS feature ID: 409314

Grantsburg is an unincorporated community in Johnson County, Illinois, United States. Grantsburg is located on Illinois Route 146 near the Shawnee National Forest, east of Vienna. Grantsburg has a post office, with the ZIP code 62943.
