= Reynoldsburg, Illinois =

- Unincorporated community
- Location within Illinois Location within the United States
- Coordinates: 37°30′55″N 88°46′33″W
- Country: United States
- State: Illinois
- County: Johnson
- Elevation: 574 ft (175 m)
- Time zone: UTC-6 (Central (CST))
  - Summer (DST): UTC-5 (CDT)
- Area code: 618
- GNIS feature ID: 426937

Reynoldsburg is an unincorporated community in Johnson County, Illinois, United States. The community is located at the intersection of Gum Springs Road and Reynoldsburg Road 9.6 miles (15.4 km) northeast of Vienna. Reynoldsburg had a post office from 1860 to 1879.
