= Parker City, Illinois =

- Former settlement
- Location within Illinois Location within the United States
- Coordinates: 37°34′3.76″N 88°47′52.28″W
- Country: United States
- State: Illinois
- County: Johnson
- Founded: Dec. 28, 1889
- Elevation: 585 ft (178 m)
- GNIS feature ID: 425308

Parker City, also known simply as Parker, is a former settlement in Johnson County, Illinois, United States. Parker City was west of New Burnside, south of Creal Springs, and founded at the crossings of the former Cleveland, Cincinnati, Chicago and St. Louis Railway and Marion to Brookport branch of the Illinois Central Railroad. The town was named after George Washington Parker, a former president of the St. Louis, Alton and Terre Haute Railroad, which was a predecessor to the Big Four.

At its peak the town reached a population of nearly 300, but slowly began to decline in the 1920s. At one time, there were two hotels, two stores, a post office, dining rooms, and restaurants. Also, two barbershops were always full of customers. The Parker City Post Office opened for business December 28, 1889 and closed down October 31, 1941. There were approximately 40 houses in Parker City during its peak.
