= 1860 United States presidential election in Ohio =

- November 6, 1860
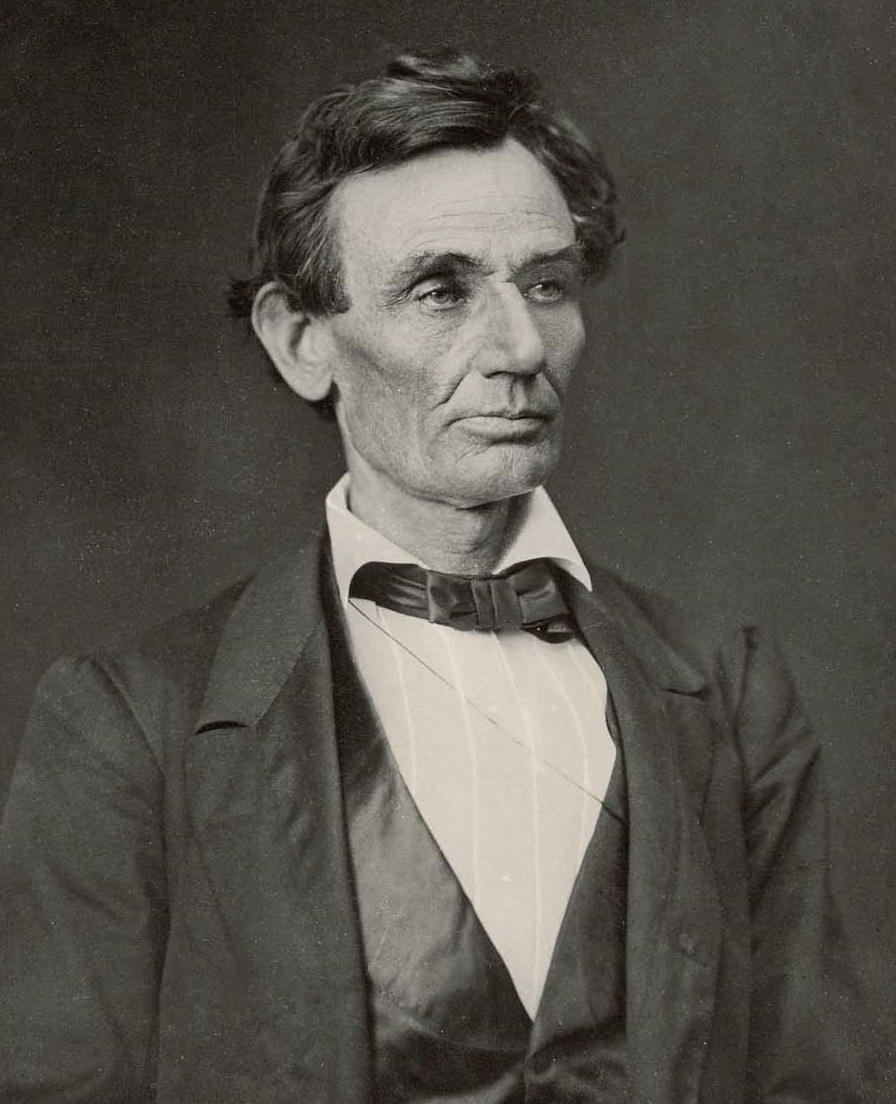

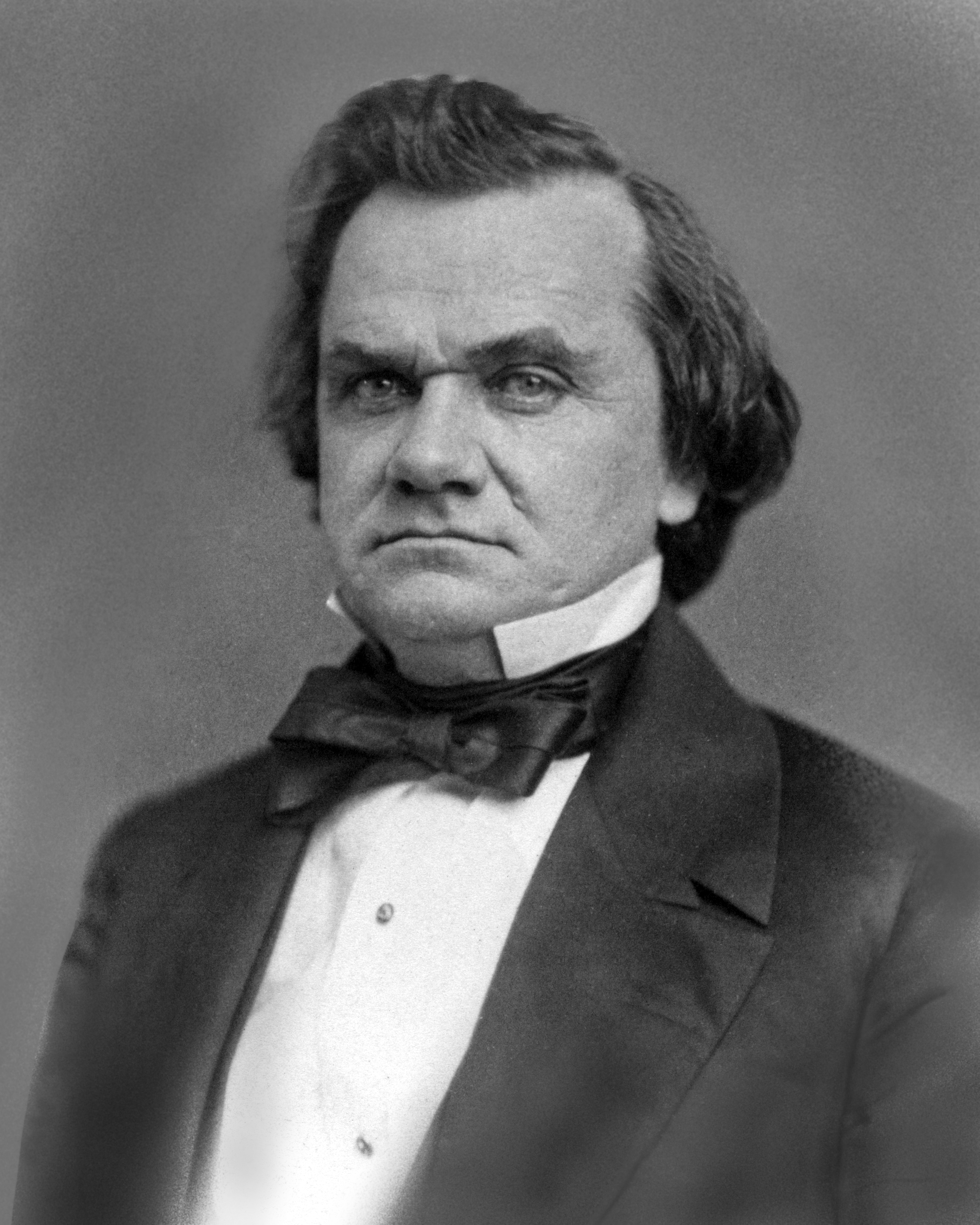
Nominee	Abraham Lincoln	Stephen A. Douglas
Party	Republican	Democratic
Home state	Illinois	Illinois
Running mate	Hannibal Hamlin	Herschel V. Johnson
Electoral vote	23	0
Popular vote	221,809	187,421
Percentage	51.24%	43.30%
County results
Lincoln
40–50%
50–60%
60–70%
70–80%
80–90%
Douglas
40–50%
50–60%
60–70%
President before election
James Buchanan
Democratic
Elected President
Abraham Lincoln
Republican

The 1860 United States presidential election in Ohio took place on November 6, 1860, as part of the 1860 United States presidential election. Voters chose 23 representatives, or electors, to the Electoral College, who voted for president and vice president.

Ohio was won by the Republican nominee Illinois Representative Abraham Lincoln and his running mate Senator Hannibal Hamlin of Maine. They defeated the Democratic nominee, Senator Stephen A. Douglas of Illinois and his running mate 41st Governor of Georgia Herschel V. Johnson. Lincoln won the state by a margin of 7.94%.

Liberty Party (under the name Union Party) candidate Gerrit Smith received 136 of his 171 popular votes in Ohio alone. The other 35 votes came from Illinois.

The 1860 presidential election in Ohio began a streak in which no Republican candidate won the election without carrying the state.

== Results ==
1860 United States presidential election in Ohio
Party	Candidate	Running mate	Popular vote		Electoral vote	
Party	Candidate	Running mate	Count	%	Count	%
Republican	Abraham Lincoln of Illinois	Hannibal Hamlin of Maine	221,809	51.24%	23	100.00%
Democratic	Stephen A. Douglas of Illinois	Herschel Vespasian Johnson of Georgia	187,421	43.30%	0	0.00%
Constitutional Union	John Bell of Tennessee	Edward Everett of Massachusetts	12,193	2.82%	0	0.00%
Southern Democratic	John C. Breckinridge of Kentucky	Joseph Lane of Oregon	11,303	2.61%	0	0.00%
Radical Abolitionist	N/A (Note: The 1860 Radical Abolitionist National Convention nominated Gerrit Smith for president and Samuel McFarland for vice president, but the Ohio Radical Abolitionist State Convention nominated unpledged electors.) of N/A	N/A of N/A	136	0.03%	0	0.00%
Total			432,862	100.00%	23	100.00%

=== Results by county ===
County	Abraham Lincoln Republican		Stephen A. Douglas Democratic		Various candidates Other parties		Margin		Total votes cast
County	#	%	#	%	#	%	#	%	Total votes cast
Adams	1,667	43.33%	2,010	52.25%	170	4.42%	-343	-8.92%	3,847
Allen	1,796	48.18%	1,882	50.48%	50	1.34%	-86	-2.30%	3,728
Ashland	2,166	49.05%	1,720	38.95%	530	12.00%	446	10.10%	4,416
Ashtabula	5,566	81.15%	860	12.54%	433	6.31%	4,706	68.61%	6,859
Athens	2,526	61.65%	1,491	36.39%	80	1.96%	1,035	25.26%	4,097
Auglaize	1,088	36.09%	1,836	60.90%	91	3.01%	-748	-24.81%	3,015
Belmont	2,675	41.00%	1,450	22.22%	2,400	36.78%	1,225	18.78%	6,525
Brown	2,105	38.69%	3,006	55.26%	329	6.05%	-901	-16.57%	5,440
Butler	2,867	39.19%	4,109	56.16%	340	4.65%	-1,242	-16.97%	7,316
Carroll	1,767	59.28%	1,043	34.99%	171	5.73%	724	24.29%	2,981
Champaign	2,325	52.12%	1,810	40.57%	326	7.31%	515	11.55%	4,461
Clark	3,017	60.15%	1,730	34.49%	269	5.36%	1,287	25.66%	5,016
Clermont	2,965	46.06%	3,206	49.81%	266	4.13%	-241	-3.75%	6,437
Clinton	2,483	61.58%	1,464	36.31%	85	2.11%	1,019	25.27%	4,032
Columbiana	3,864	60.37%	2,130	33.28%	407	6.35%	1,734	27.09%	6,401
Coshocton	2,299	47.83%	2,288	47.60%	220	4.57%	11	0.23%	4,807
Crawford	2,064	41.69%	2,752	55.58%	135	2.73%	-688	-13.89%	4,951
Cuyahoga	8,686	62.45%	4,814	34.61%	408	2.94%	3,872	27.84%	13,908
Darke	2,460	49.23%	2,479	49.61%	58	1.16%	-19	-0.38%	4,997
Defiance	1,038	43.87%	1,304	55.11%	24	1.02%	-266	-11.24%	2,366
Delaware	2,699	56.94%	1,967	41.50%	74	1.56%	732	15.44%	4,740
Erie	2,886	63.57%	1,538	33.88%	116	2.55%	1,348	29.69%	4,540
Fairfield	2,178	37.66%	3,249	56.18%	356	6.16%	-1,071	-18.52%	5,783
Fayette	1,458	50.59%	1,121	38.90%	303	10.51%	337	11.69%	2,882
Franklin	4,295	45.99%	4,846	51.90%	197	2.11%	-551	-5.89%	9,338
Fulton	1,629	61.63%	984	37.23%	30	1.14%	645	24.40%	2,643
Gallia	1,881	52.54%	1,472	41.12%	227	6.34%	409	11.42%	3,580
Geauga	2,877	79.70%	677	18.75%	56	1.55%	2,200	60.95%	3,610
Greene	3,260	63.06%	1,751	33.87%	159	3.07%	1,509	29.19%	5,170
Guernsey	2,510	55.18%	1,933	42.49%	106	2.33%	577	12.69%	4,549
Hamilton	16,182	45.37%	15,431	43.27%	4,051	11.36%	751	2.10%	35,664
Hancock	2,135	47.70%	2,301	51.41%	40	0.89%	-166	-3.71%	4,476
Hardin	1,432	52.72%	1,198	44.11%	86	3.17%	234	8.61%	2,716
Harrison	2,175	60.00%	759	20.94%	691	19.06%	1,416	39.06%	3,625
Henry	808	43.60%	1,039	56.07%	6	0.33%	-231	-12.47%	1,853
Highland	2,409	45.34%	2,272	42.76%	632	11.90%	137	2.58%	5,313
Hocking	1,329	42.42%	1,784	56.94%	134	4.14%	-455	-14.52%	3,247
Holmes	1,392	37.41%	2,281	61.30%	48	1.29%	-889	-23.89%	3,721
Huron	4,107	65.39%	2,083	33.16%	91	1.45%	2,024	32.23%	6,281
Jackson	1,738	53.17%	1,436	43.93%	95	2.90%	302	9.24%	3,269
Jefferson	2,682	57.96%	1,163	25.14%	782	16.90%	1,519	32.82%	4,627
Knox	2,860	51.48%	2,060	37.08%	636	11.44%	800	14.40%	5,556
Lake	2,521	77.74%	622	19.18%	100	3.08%	1,899	58.56%	3,243
Lawrence	1,801	55.90%	1,147	35.60%	274	8.50%	654	20.30%	3,222
Licking	3,502	47.06%	3,154	42.38%	786	10.56%	348	4.68%	7,442
Logan	2,415	59.28%	1,542	37.85%	117	2.87%	873	21.43%	4,074
Lorain	4,045	66.89%	1,766	29.20%	236	3.91%	2,279	37.69%	6,047
Lucas	2,889	58.85%	1,820	37.07%	200	4.08%	1,069	21.78%	4,909
Madison	1,417	53.03%	1,016	38.02%	239	8.95%	401	15.01%	2,672
Mahoning	2,907	57.51%	1,990	39.37%	158	3.12%	917	18.14%	5,055
Marion	1,595	49.03%	1,640	50.42%	18	0.55%	-45	-1.39%	3,253
Medina	3,068	62.64%	1,765	36.04%	65	1.32%	1,303	26.60%	4,898
Meigs	2,689	58.30%	1,699	36.84%	224	4.86%	990	21.46%	4,612
Mercer	832	34.01%	1,606	65.66%	8	0.33%	-774	-31.65%	2,446
Miami	3,431	58.69%	2,337	39.98%	78	1.33%	1,094	18.71%	5,846
Monroe	1,335	28.57%	3,147	67.36%	190	4.07%	-1,812	-38.79%	4,672
Montgomery	4,974	50.07%	4,710	47.41%	251	2.52%	264	2.66%	9,935
Morgan	2,445	57.03%	1,757	40.98%	85	1.99%	688	16.05%	4,287
Morrow	2,260	53.18%	1,928	45.36%	62	1.46%	332	7.82%	4,250
Muskingum	4,004	49.39%	3,550	43.79%	553	6.82%	454	5.60%	8,107
Noble	1,944	52.02%	1,647	44.07%	146	3.91%	297	7.95%	3,737
Ottawa	571	44.37%	692	53.77%	24	1.86%	-121	-9.40%	1,287
Paulding	554	58.07%	391	40.99%	9	0.94%	163	17.08%	954
Perry	1,605	43.51%	1,950	52.86%	134	3.63%	-345	-9.35%	3,689
Pickaway	2,002	42.70%	2,425	51.73%	261	5.57%	-423	-9.03%	4,688
Pike	958	38.44%	1,397	56.06%	137	5.50%	-439	-17.62%	2,492
Portage	3,065	59.34%	1,970	38.14%	130	2.52%	1,095	21.20%	5,165
Preble	2,596	59.24%	1,733	39.55%	53	1.21%	863	19.69%	4,382
Putnam	1,010	40.48%	1,478	59.24%	7	0.28%	-468	-18.76%	2,495
Richland	3,023	47.60%	3,135	49.36%	193	3.04%	-112	-1.76%	6,351
Ross	3,043	47.35%	2,806	43.67%	577	8.98%	237	3.68%	6,426
Sandusky	1,938	45.28%	2,319	54.18%	23	0.54%	-381	-8.90%	4,280
Scioto	2,186	50.51%	1,750	40.43%	392	9.06%	436	10.08%	4,328
Seneca	3,052	48.14%	3,175	50.08%	113	1.78%	-123	-1.94%	6,340
Shelby	1,597	48.29%	1,669	50.47%	41	1.24%	-72	-2.18%	3,307
Stark	4,064	52.98%	2,820	36.76%	787	10.26%	1,244	16.22%	7,671
Summit	3,607	65.52%	1,785	32.43%	113	2.05%	1,822	33.09%	5,505
Trumbull	4,349	69.22%	1,672	26.61%	262	4.17%	2,677	42.61%	6,283
Tuscarawas	3,136	51.72%	2,846	46.93%	82	1.35%	290	4.79%	6,064
Union	1,792	55.55%	1,145	35.49%	289	8.96%	647	20.06%	3,226
Van Wert	1,015	50.93%	959	48.12%	19	0.95%	56	2.81%	1,993
Vinton	1,246	49.39%	1,231	48.79%	46	1.82%	15	0.60%	2,523
Warren	3,316	60.62%	2,011	36.76%	143	2.62%	1,305	23.86%	5,470
Washington	3,169	49.38%	3,060	47.69%	188	2.93%	109	1.69%	6,417
Wayne	3,204	48.73%	3,250	49.43%	121	1.84%	-46	-0.70%	6,575
Williams	1,713	56.52%	1,180	38.93%	138	4.55%	533	17.59%	3,031
Wood	2,011	59.85%	1,330	39.58%	19	0.57%	681	20.27%	3,360
Wyandot	1,567	47.72%	1,670	50.85%	47	1.43%	-103	-3.13%	3,284
Totals	231,809	52.33%	187,421	42.31%	23,736	5.36%	44,388	10.02%	442,966

== See also ==
- United States presidential elections in Ohio
