= Bloomfield, Johnson County, Illinois =

- Unincorporated community
- Location within Illinois Location within the United States
- Coordinates: 37°27′09″N 88°52′30″W
- Country: United States
- State: Illinois
- County: Johnson
- Elevation: 423 ft (129 m)
- Time zone: UTC-6 (Central (CST))
  - Summer (DST): UTC-5 (CDT)
- Area code: 618
- GNIS feature ID: 404571

Bloomfield is an unincorporated community in Johnson County, Illinois, United States. Bloomfield is located along U.S. Route 45, 3 miles (4.8 km) north-northeast of Vienna.
