= Pond, Illinois =

- Unincorporated community
- Location within Illinois Location within the United States
- Coordinates: 37°26′42″N 88°49′58″W
- Country: United States
- State: Illinois
- County: Johnson
- Elevation: 528 ft (161 m)
- Time zone: UTC-6 (Central (CST))
  - Summer (DST): UTC-5 (CDT)
- Area code: 618
- GNIS feature ID: 1815888

Pond is an unincorporated community in Johnson County, Illinois, United States. The community is located along Illinois Route 147, 4.1 miles (6.6 km) east-northeast of Vienna.
