= Buncombe, Illinois =

- Village
- Location of Buncombe in Johnson County, Illinois
- Coordinates: 37°28′18″N 88°58′29″W
- Country: United States
- State: Illinois
- County: Johnson

Area
  - Total: 1.20 sq mi (3.11 km^{2})
  - Land: 1.19 sq mi (3.08 km^{2})
  - Water: 0.012 sq mi (0.03 km^{2})
- Elevation: 522 ft (159 m)

Population (2020)
  - Total: 207
  - Density: 174.3/sq mi (67.31/km^{2})
- Time zone: UTC-6 (CST)
  - Summer (DST): UTC-5 (CDT)
- Zip code: 62912
- Area code: 618
- FIPS code: 17-09551
- GNIS feature ID: 2397494

Buncombe is a village in Johnson County, Illinois, United States. The population was 207 at the 2020 census.

== History ==
Buncombe was named for the settlers who came from Buncombe County, North Carolina.

== Geography ==
Buncombe is located in western Johnson County. Illinois Route 37 passes through the village, leading north 6 miles (10 km) to Goreville and south 8 miles (13 km) to Cypress. Vienna, the county seat, is 8 miles (13 km) to the southeast via Route 37 and Route 146.

According to the 2021 census gazetteer files, Buncombe has a total area of 1.20 square miles (3.11 km^{2}), of which 1.19 square miles (3.08 km^{2}) (or 98.92%) is land and 0.01 square miles (0.03 km^{2}) (or 1.08%) is water.

== Demographics ==
Historical population
Census	Pop.	Note	%±
1920	280		—
1930	241		−13.9%
1940	263		9.1%
1950	210		−20.2%
1960	200		−4.8%
1970	187		−6.5%
1980	231		23.5%
1990	208		−10.0%
2000	186		−10.6%
2010	203		9.1%
2020	207		2.0%
U.S. Decennial Census

As of the 2020 census there were 207 people, 90 households, and 66 families residing in the village. The population density was 172.50 inhabitants per square mile (66.60/km^{2}). There were 98 housing units at an average density of 81.67 per square mile (31.53/km^{2}). The racial makeup of the village was 95.65% White, 0.00% African American, 0.00% Native American, 0.48% Asian, 0.00% Pacific Islander, 1.45% from other races, and 2.42% from two or more races. Hispanic or Latino of any race were 2.90% of the population.

There were 90 households, out of which 43.3% had children under the age of 18 living with them, 37.78% were married couples living together, 32.22% had a female householder with no husband present, and 26.67% were non-families. 21.11% of all households were made up of individuals, and 10.00% had someone living alone who was 65 years of age or older. The average household size was 3.68 and the average family size was 3.14.

The village's age distribution consisted of 35.7% under the age of 18, 17.0% from 18 to 24, 14.8% from 25 to 44, 20.4% from 45 to 64, and 12.0% who were 65 years of age or older. The median age was 23.8 years. For every 100 females, there were 85.0 males. For every 100 females age 18 and over, there were 82.0 males.

The median income for a household in the village was $45,000, and the median income for a family was $56,250. Males had a median income of $57,500 versus $21,563 for females. The per capita income for the village was $18,786. About 19.7% of families and 23.7% of the population were below the poverty line, including 25.7% of those under age 18 and 0.0% of those age 65 or over.
