= Ganntown, Illinois =

- Unincorporated community
- Location within Illinois Location within the United States
- Coordinates: 37°21′48″N 88°47′03″W
- Country: United States
- State: Illinois
- County: Johnson
- Elevation: 548 ft (167 m)
- Time zone: UTC-6 (Central (CST))
  - Summer (DST): UTC-5 (CDT)
- Area code: 618
- GNIS feature ID: 408870

Ganntown is an unincorporated community in Johnson County, Illinois, United States. The community is located along County Route 10 7.2 miles (11.6 km) east-southeast of Vienna.
