= 1860 United States presidential election in Illinois =

- November 6, 1860
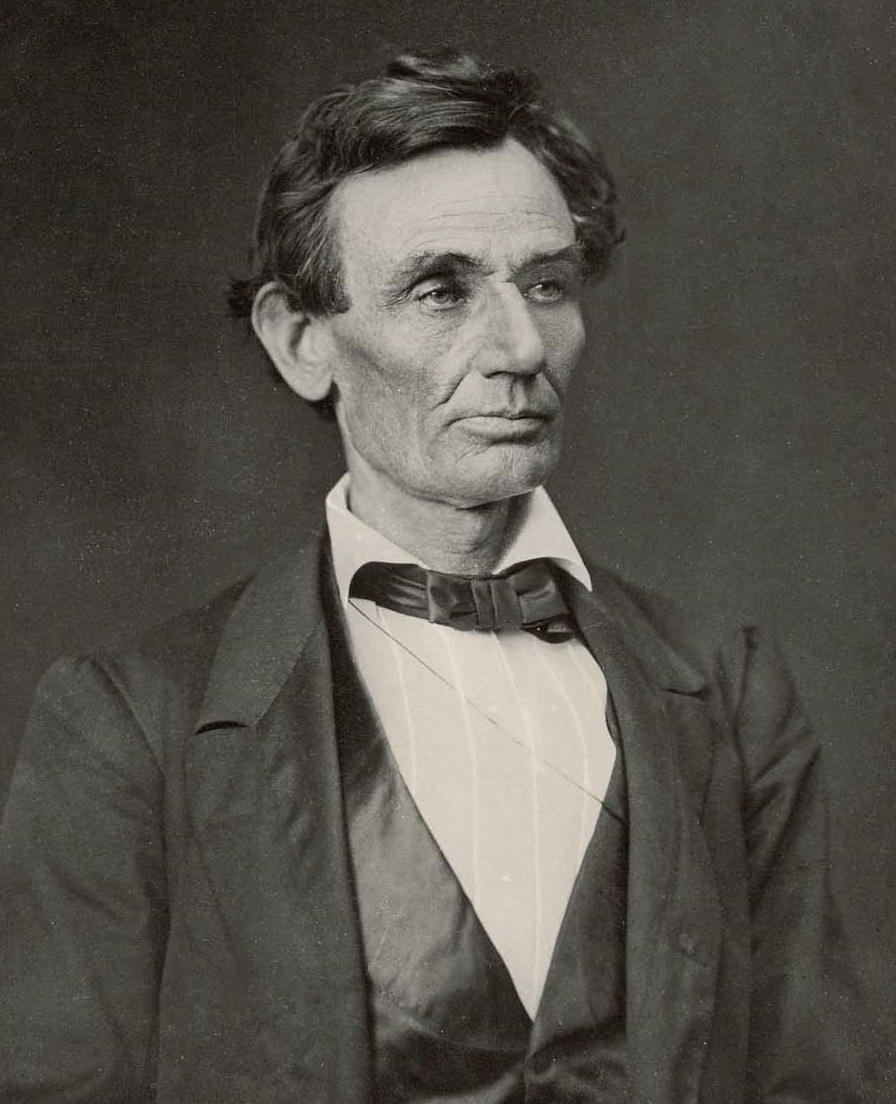

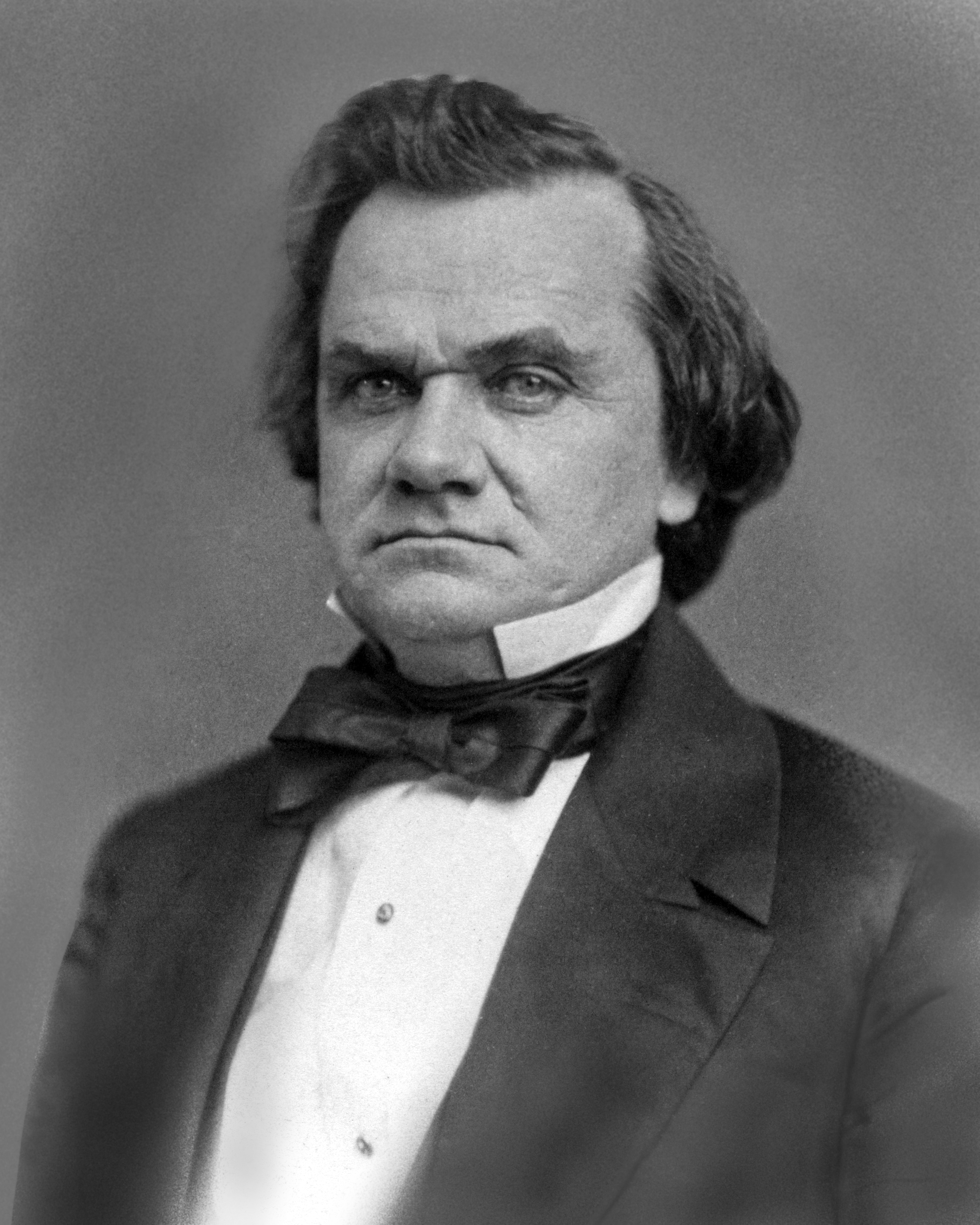
Nominee	Abraham Lincoln	Stephen A. Douglas
Party	Republican	Democratic
Home state	Illinois	Illinois
Running mate	Hannibal Hamlin	Herschel V. Johnson
Electoral vote	11	0
Popular vote	172,171	160,215
Percentage	50.69%	47.17%
County results
Lincoln
40–50%
50–60%
60–70%
70–80%
80–90%
Douglas
40–50%
50–60%
60–70%
70–80%
80–90%
90–100%
President before election
James Buchanan
Democratic
Elected President
Abraham Lincoln
Republican

The 1860 United States presidential election in Illinois took place on November 6, 1860, as part of the 1860 United States presidential election. Illinois voters chose 11 representatives, or electors, to the Electoral College, who voted for president and vice president.

Illinois was the home state of both major party nominees, Republican candidate and former Whig congressman Abraham Lincoln as well as Democratic candidate Senator Stephen A. Douglas. The race was, in effect, a rematch of the 1858 Senate election in Illinois, where Douglas prevailed over Lincoln.

Abraham Lincoln would win Illinois by a narrow margin of 3.52%.

In Illinois, the Liberty Party ran under the name Union Party. The party's candidate, Gerrit Smith, received 35 of his 171 popular votes in Illinois alone. The other 136 votes came from Ohio. Pope County has voted Democratic twice since this election (in 1992 and 1996) and Johnson County has done so once (in 1992). However, this is the last time either county gave a majority to the Democratic nominee.

Johnson County would give Douglas 96.96 percent of its vote, making it his strongest county nationwide.

== Results ==
1860 United States presidential election in Illinois
Party	Candidate	Votes	%
Republican	Abraham Lincoln Hannibal Hamlin	172,171	50.69%
Democratic	Stephen A. Douglas Herschel V. Johnson	160,215	47.17%
Constitutional Union	John Bell Edward Everett	4,914	1.45%
Southern Democratic	John C. Breckinridge Joseph Lane	2,331	0.69%
Radical Abolitionist	Gerrit Smith Samuel McFarland	35	0.01%
Total votes		339,666	100.00%

=== Results by county ===
1860 United States presidential election in Illinois by county
County	Abraham Lincoln Republican		Stephen A. Douglas Democratic		John Bell Constitutional Union		John C. Breckinridge Southern Democratic		Gerrit Smith Radical Abolitionist		Total Votes Cast
County	#	%	#	%	#	%	#	%	#	%	Total Votes Cast
Adams	3,811	46.34%	4,265	51.86%	81	0.98%	67	0.81%	0	0.00%	8,224
Alexander	106	10.12%	684	65.33%	178	17.00%	79	7.55%	0	0.00%	1,047
Bond	987	49.47%	981	49.17%	25	1.25%	2	0.10%	0	0.00%	1,995
Boone	1,759	85.02%	310	14.98%	0	0.00%	9	0.43%	0	0.00%	2,069
Brown	728	36.60%	1,202	60.43%	33	1.66%	26	1.31%	0	0.00%	1,989
Bureau	3,622	69.17%	1,415	27.02%	20	0.38%	179	3.42%	9	0.17%	5,236
Calhoun	269	26.82%	668	66.60%	66	6.58%	0	0.00%	0	0.00%	1,003
Carroll	1,630	77.88%	461	22.03%	1	0.05%	1	0.05%	3	0.14%	2,093
Cass	1,046	44.12%	1,301	54.87%	19	0.80%	5	0.21%	0	0.00%	2,371
Champaign	1,793	58.52%	1,221	39.85%	25	0.82%	25	0.82%	0	0.00%	3,064
Christian	968	40.25%	1,408	58.54%	20	0.83%	9	0.37%	0	0.00%	2,405
Clark	1,313	43.12%	1,724	56.62%	8	0.26%	0	0.00%	0	0.00%	3,045
Clay	681	38.19%	1,070	60.01%	30	1.68%	2	0.11%	0	0.00%	1,783
Clinton	748	35.74%	1,294	61.83%	45	2.15%	6	0.29%	0	0.00%	2,093
Coles	1,495	49.16%	1,467	48.24%	79	2.60%	0	0.00%	0	0.00%	3,041
Cook	14,589	59.24%	9,846	39.98%	107	0.43%	87	0.35%	2	0.01%	24,629
Crawford	921	39.53%	1,384	59.40%	24	1.03%	1	0.04%	0	0.00%	2,330
Cumberland	629	40.61%	909	58.68%	9	0.58%	2	0.13%	0	0.00%	1,549
DeKalb	3,049	75.79%	965	23.99%	8	0.20%	1	0.02%	0	0.00%	4,023
DeWitt	1,258	52.24%	1,015	42.15%	73	3.03%	62	2.57%	0	0.00%	2,408
DuPage	1,790	68.90%	803	30.91%	39	1.50%	2	0.08%	4	0.15%	2,598
Douglas	809	54.48%	629	42.36%	3	0.20%	8	0.54%	0	0.00%	1,485
Edgar	1,727	46.34%	1,923	51.60%	66	1.77%	11	0.30%	0	0.00%	3,727
Edwards	580	60.04%	370	38.30%	16	1.66%	0	0.00%	0	0.00%	966
Effingham	453	29.47%	1,084	70.53%	9	0.59%	0	0.00%	0	0.00%	1,537
Fayette	953	37.33%	1,571	61.54%	27	1.06%	2	0.08%	0	0.00%	2,553
Ford	235	61.36%	148	38.64%	0	0.00%	0	0.00%	0	0.00%	383
Franklin	228	13.42%	1,391	81.87%	75	4.41%	5	0.29%	0	0.00%	1,699
Fulton	3,629	47.66%	3,926	51.56%	48	0.63%	11	0.14%	0	0.00%	7,614
Gallatin	221	16.47%	1,020	76.01%	88	6.56%	13	0.97%	0	0.00%	1,342
Greene	979	30.38%	2,173	67.42%	67	2.08%	4	0.12%	0	0.00%	3,223
Grundy	1,412	66.35%	710	33.36%	0	0.00%	3	0.14%	0	0.00%	2,128
Hamilton	102	5.82%	1,553	88.54%	99	5.64%	0	0.00%	0	0.00%	1,754
Hancock	2,568	45.26%	2,960	52.17%	115	2.03%	31	0.55%	0	0.00%	5,674
Hardin	107	16.02%	499	74.70%	62	9.28%	0	0.00%	0	0.00%	668
Henderson	1,253	56.52%	911	41.09%	31	1.40%	22	0.99%	0	0.00%	2,217
Henry	3,022	66.07%	1,532	33.49%	4	0.09%	16	0.35%	0	0.00%	4,574
Iroquois	1,429	59.74%	955	39.92%	0	0.00%	8	0.33%	0	0.00%	2,392
Jackson	315	15.39%	1,556	76.01%	147	7.18%	29	1.42%	0	0.00%	2,047
Jasper	626	40.70%	906	58.91%	5	0.33%	1	0.07%	0	0.00%	1,538
Jefferson	459	18.60%	1,852	75.04%	136	5.51%	21	0.85%	0	0.00%	2,468
Jersey	910	39.27%	1,291	55.72%	105	4.53%	11	0.47%	0	0.00%	2,317
Jo Daviess	2,782	59.57%	1,841	39.42%	38	0.81%	9	0.19%	0	0.00%	4,670
Johnson	40	2.48%	1,563	96.96%	0	0.00%	9	0.56%	0	0.00%	1,612
Kane	4,207	71.57%	1,651	28.09%	8	0.14%	12	0.20%	0	0.00%	5,878
Kankakee	1,977	70.48%	803	28.63%	9	0.32%	16	0.57%	0	0.00%	2,805
Kendall	1,811	76.00%	571	23.96%	0	0.00%	1	0.04%	0	0.00%	2,383
Knox	3,832	62.95%	2,208	36.27%	30	0.49%	17	0.28%	0	0.00%	6,087
Lake	2,394	71.06%	965	28.64%	4	0.12%	6	0.18%	0	0.00%	3,369
LaSalle	5,342	55.21%	4,290	44.34%	35	0.36%	8	0.08%	7	0.07%	9,675
Lawrence	764	43.76%	970	55.56%	12	0.69%	0	0.00%	0	0.00%	1,746
Lee	2,420	67.58%	1,140	31.83%	15	0.42%	6	0.17%	1	0.03%	3,581
Livingston	1,474	57.53%	1,088	42.47%	0	0.00%	0	0.00%	0	0.00%	2,562
Logan	1,729	52.68%	1,521	46.34%	28	0.85%	4	0.12%	0	0.00%	3,282
Macon	1,501	48.00%	1,541	49.28%	56	1.79%	29	0.93%	0	0.00%	3,127
Macoupin	2,192	42.62%	2,688	52.27%	225	4.37%	38	0.74%	0	0.00%	5,143
Madison	3,161	48.93%	3,100	47.99%	178	2.76%	21	0.33%	0	0.00%	6,460
Marion	858	32.18%	1,715	64.33%	90	3.38%	3	0.11%	0	0.00%	2,666
Marshall	1,630	53.90%	1,376	45.50%	0	0.00%	18	0.60%	0	0.00%	3,024
Mason	1,198	48.46%	1,224	49.51%	47	1.90%	3	0.12%	0	0.00%	2,472
Massac	121	11.22%	873	80.98%	84	7.79%	0	0.00%	0	0.00%	1,078
McDonough	2,255	49.14%	2,266	49.38%	62	1.35%	6	0.13%	0	0.00%	4,589
McHenry	3,033	67.49%	1,444	32.13%	9	0.20%	8	0.18%	0	0.00%	4,494
McLean	3,547	57.40%	2,567	41.54%	58	0.94%	7	0.11%	2	0.03%	6,179
Menard	962	46.38%	1,035	49.90%	66	3.18%	11	0.53%	0	0.00%	2,074
Mercer	1,808	59.49%	1,193	39.26%	35	1.15%	3	0.10%	4	0.13%	3,039
Monroe	845	37.34%	1,401	61.91%	17	0.75%	0	0.00%	0	0.00%	2,263
Montgomery	1,099	36.50%	1,743	57.89%	169	5.61%	0	0.00%	0	0.00%	3,011
Morgan	2,312	47.78%	2,419	49.99%	94	1.94%	14	0.29%	0	0.00%	4,839
Moultrie	618	46.22%	707	52.88%	12	0.90%	0	0.00%	0	0.00%	1,337
Ogle	3,184	69.90%	1,315	28.87%	40	0.88%	16	0.35%	0	0.00%	4,555
Peoria	3,539	48.03%	3,738	50.73%	40	0.54%	51	0.69%	0	0.00%	7,368
Perry	649	34.36%	1,101	58.28%	138	7.31%	1	0.05%	0	0.00%	1,889
Piatt	782	54.61%	599	41.83%	51	3.56%	0	0.00%	0	0.00%	1,432
Pike	2,553	45.23%	3,016	53.43%	39	0.69%	37	0.66%	0	0.00%	5,645
Pope	127	8.99%	1,202	85.07%	83	5.87%	1	0.07%	0	0.00%	1,413
Pulaski	220	23.53%	560	59.89%	45	4.81%	40	4.28%	0	0.00%	935
Putnam	751	63.59%	366	30.99%	0	0.00%	64	5.42%	0	0.00%	1,181
Randolph	1,382	42.19%	1,815	55.40%	71	2.17%	8	0.24%	0	0.00%	3,276
Richland	777	42.53%	1,022	55.94%	22	1.20%	6	0.33%	0	0.00%	1,827
Rock Island	2,088	57.81%	1,478	40.92%	34	0.94%	12	0.33%	1	0.03%	3,612
Saline	100	6.39%	1,338	85.44%	113	7.22%	15	0.96%	0	0.00%	1,566
Sangamon	3,556	48.31%	3,598	48.88%	130	1.77%	77	1.05%	0	0.00%	7,361
Schuyler	956	37.67%	1,559	61.43%	15	0.59%	8	0.32%	0	0.00%	2,538
Scott	832	42.17%	1,131	57.32%	5	0.25%	5	0.25%	0	0.00%	1,973
Shelby	971	31.13%	2,088	66.94%	60	1.92%	0	0.00%	0	0.00%	3,119
Stark	1,164	63.06%	659	35.70%	23	1.25%	0	0.00%	0	0.00%	1,846
St. Clair	3,682	53.63%	3,014	43.90%	147	2.14%	23	0.33%	0	0.00%	6,866
Stephenson	2,670	59.69%	1,787	39.95%	4	0.09%	12	0.27%	0	0.00%	4,473
Tazewell	2,348	51.66%	2,168	47.70%	26	0.57%	3	0.07%	0	0.00%	4,545
Union	157	7.73%	996	49.06%	58	2.86%	819	40.34%	0	0.00%	2,030
Vermilion	2,251	58.64%	1,577	41.08%	4	0.10%	7	0.18%	0	0.00%	3,839
Wabash	597	44.89%	710	53.38%	22	1.65%	1	0.08%	0	0.00%	1,330
Warren	2,208	56.46%	1,672	42.75%	17	0.43%	14	0.36%	0	0.00%	3,911
Washington	793	32.82%	1,565	64.78%	58	2.40%	0	0.00%	0	0.00%	2,416
Wayne	620	26.75%	1,645	70.97%	48	2.07%	5	0.22%	0	0.00%	2,318
White	756	32.27%	1,544	65.90%	38	1.62%	5	0.21%	0	0.00%	2,343
Whiteside	2,713	70.50%	1,110	28.85%	17	0.44%	8	0.21%	0	0.00%	3,848
Will	3,219	55.90%	2,515	43.68%	12	0.21%	12	0.21%	1	0.02%	5,758
Williamson	173	7.81%	1,835	82.88%	166	7.50%	40	1.81%	0	0.00%	2,214
Winnebago	3,984	82.76%	817	16.97%	3	0.06%	10	0.21%	0	0.00%	4,814
Woodford	1,238	45.75%	1,419	52.44%	39	1.44%	10	0.37%	0	0.00%	2,706
Total	172,161	50.68%	160,215	47.16%	4,942	1.45%	2,320	0.68%	34	0.01%	339,693

==== Counties that flipped from Democratic to Republican ====
- Coles
- DeWitt
- Logan
- Tazewell

==== Counties that flipped from Know Nothing to Republican ====
- Bond
- Edwards
- Madison
- Piatt

==== Counties that flipped from Know Nothing to Democratic ====
- Wabash

== See also ==
- United States presidential elections in Illinois
