= Reevesville, Illinois =

- Unincorporated community
- Location within Illinois Location within the United States
- Coordinates: 37°20′35″N 88°43′11″W
- Country: United States
- State: Illinois
- County: Johnson
- Elevation: 351 ft (107 m)
- Time zone: UTC-6 (Central (CST))
  - Summer (DST): UTC-5 (CDT)
- Area code: 618
- GNIS feature ID: 416506

Reevesville is an unincorporated community in Johnson County, Illinois, United States. The community is located along County Route 10 and the Canadian National Railway (formerly the Illinois Central) 11 miles (18 km) east-southeast of Vienna.
