= Cypress, Illinois =

- Village
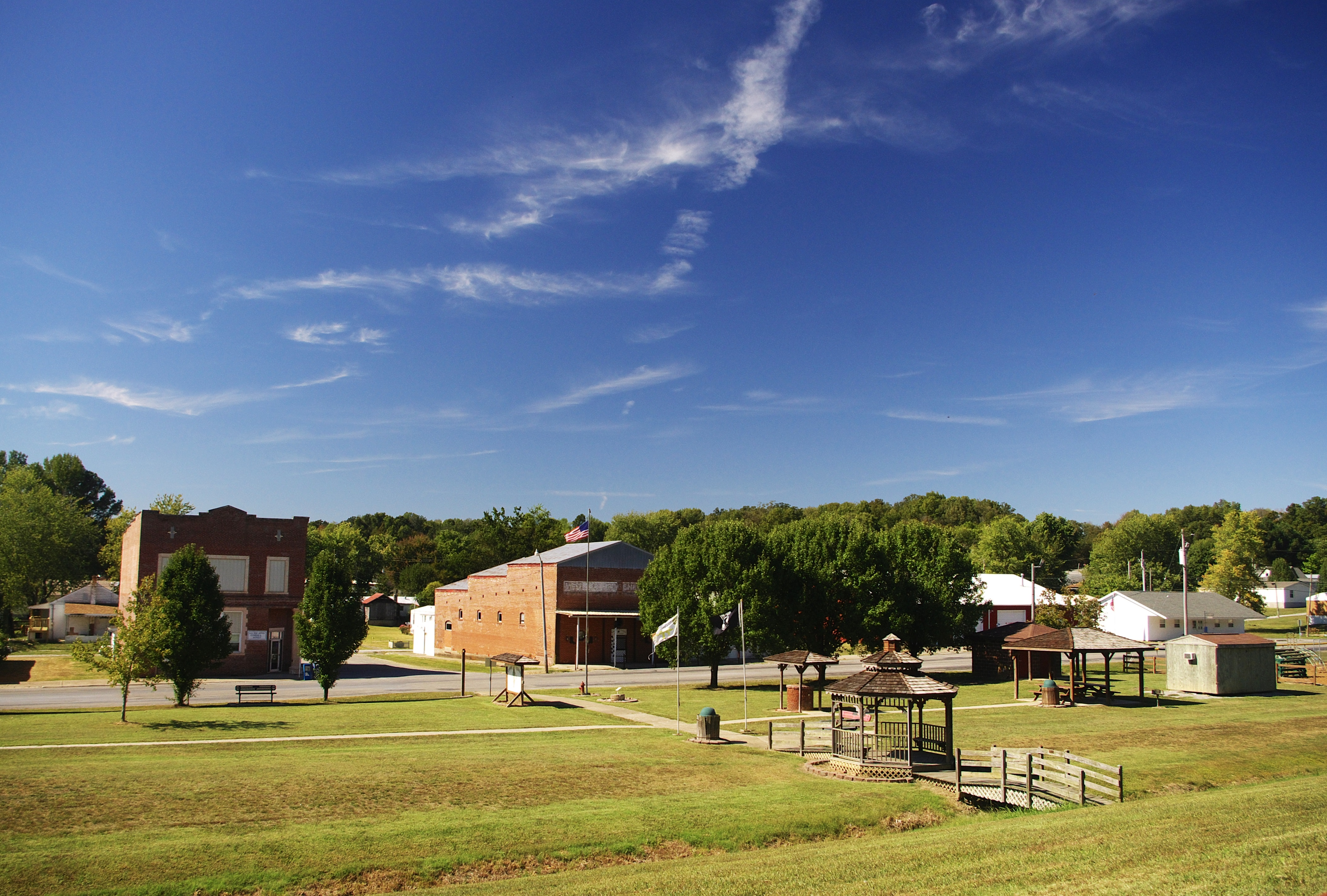
- Cypress

- Location of Cypress in Johnson County, Illinois
- Coordinates: 37°21′56″N 89°01′08″W
- Country: United States
- State: Illinois
- County: Johnson

Area
  - Total: 0.76 sq mi (1.96 km^{2})
  - Land: 0.75 sq mi (1.95 km^{2})
  - Water: 0.0039 sq mi (0.01 km^{2})
- Elevation: 381 ft (116 m)

Population (2020)
  - Total: 217
  - Density: 288.3/sq mi (111.31/km^{2})
- Time zone: UTC-6 (CST)
  - Summer (DST): UTC-5 (CDT)
- ZIP code: 62923
- Area code: 618
- FIPS code: 17-18251
- GNIS feature ID: 2398666

Cypress is a village in Johnson County, Illinois, United States. The population was 217 at the 2020 census.

== History ==
Cypress was established in the late 1890s as a stop along the Chicago and Eastern Illinois Railroad, a Class I railroad. A post office which had been operating at Gray's Mill (east of modern Cypress) was moved to the new location, a former bank. The village's name is likely a reference to the cypress trees that grow in abundance in the Cache River basin. Cypress Grade School was built in 1917, and was damaged by a tornado on April 28, 2002. Around four years later, the current school was finished.

== Geography ==
Cypress is located in southwestern Johnson County. The village is situated in the Cache River basin northwest of Karnak and southwest of Vienna. The Heron Pond – Little Black Slough Nature Preserve lies to the east of Cypress. Illinois Route 37 passes through the village.

According to the 2021 census gazetteer files, Cypress has a total area of 0.76 square miles (1.97 km^{2}), of which 0.75 square miles (1.94 km^{2}) (or 99.60%) is land and 0.00 square miles (0.00 km^{2}) (or 0.40%) is water.

== Demographics ==
Historical population
Census	Pop.	Note	%±
1910	311		—
1920	438		40.8%
1930	377		−13.9%
1940	407		8.0%
1950	357		−12.3%
1960	264		−26.1%
1970	261		−1.1%
1980	271		3.8%
1990	275		1.5%
2000	271		−1.5%
2010	234		−13.7%
2020	217		−7.3%
U.S. Decennial Census

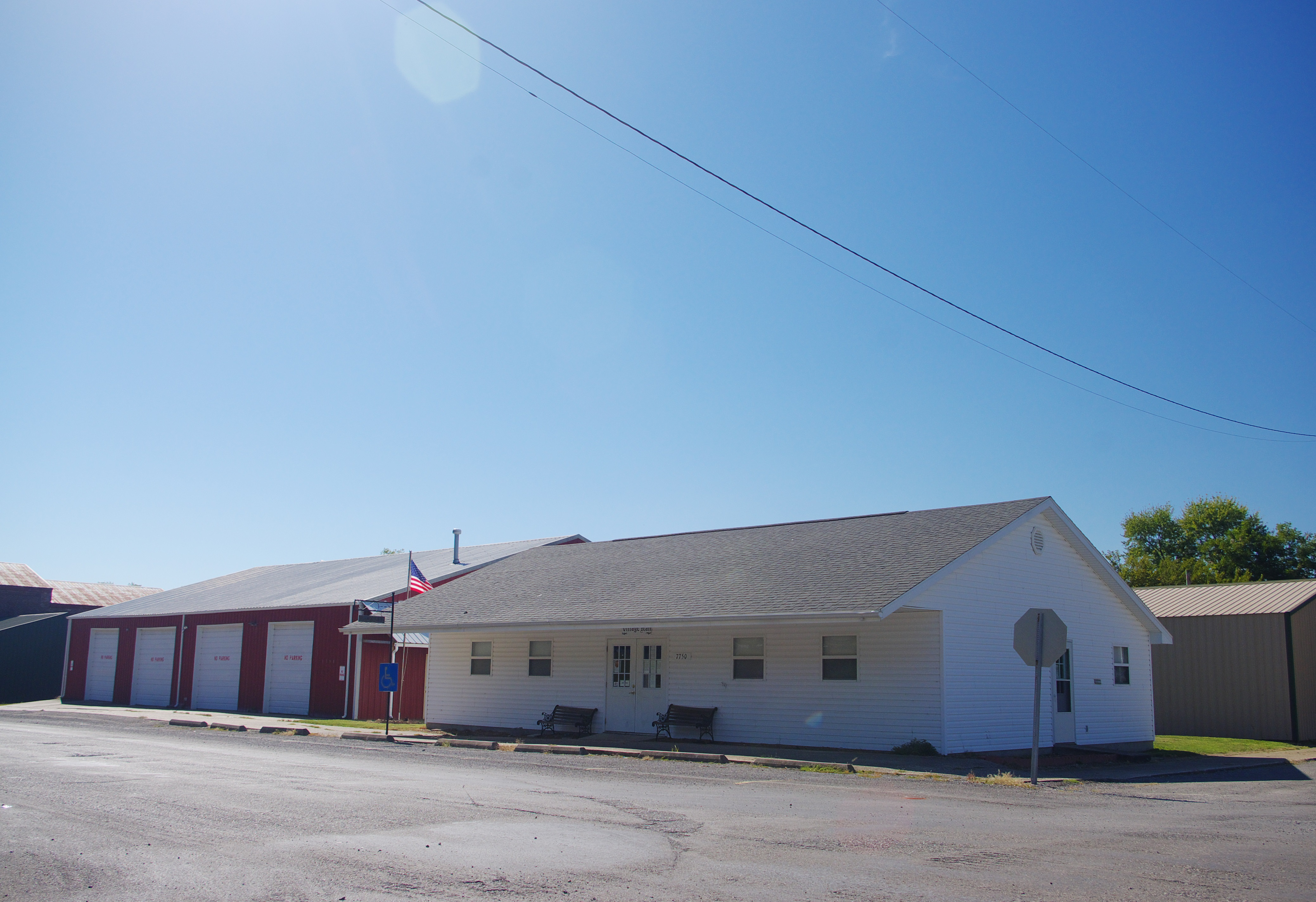
Cypress Village Hall

As of the 2020 census there were 217 people, 86 households, and 51 families residing in the village. The population density was 287.04 inhabitants per square mile (110.83/km^{2}). There were 97 housing units at an average density of 128.31 per square mile (49.54/km^{2}). The racial makeup of the village was 95.85% White, 0.00% African American, 0.00% Native American, 0.00% Asian, 0.00% Pacific Islander, 0.00% from other races, and 4.15% from two or more races. Hispanic or Latino of any race were 0.00% of the population.

There were 86 households, out of which 31.4% had children under the age of 18 living with them, 43.02% were married couples living together, 8.14% had a female householder with no husband present, and 40.70% were non-families. 31.40% of all households were made up of individuals, and 15.12% had someone living alone who was 65 years of age or older. The average household size was 3.04 and the average family size was 2.51.

The village's age distribution consisted of 23.6% under the age of 18, 12.0% from 18 to 24, 25.9% from 25 to 44, 21.7% from 45 to 64, and 16.7% who were 65 years of age or older. The median age was 35.2 years. For every 100 females, there were 56.5 males. For every 100 females age 18 and over, there were 61.8 males.

The median income for a household in the village was $37,500, and the median income for a family was $36,528. Males had a median income of $33,958 versus $11,875 for females. The per capita income for the village was $18,240. About 11.8% of families and 22.9% of the population were below the poverty line, including 24.5% of those under age 18 and 11.1% of those age 65 or over.

== Transportation ==
No airports or bus systems are active in Cypress. Bicycling is common inside the village. Train tracks from the Chicago and Eastern Illinois Railroad remain but have been abandoned since 1984.

=== Major highways ===
- Illinois Route 37
