= Johnson County, Illinois =

County in Illinois, United States

- County
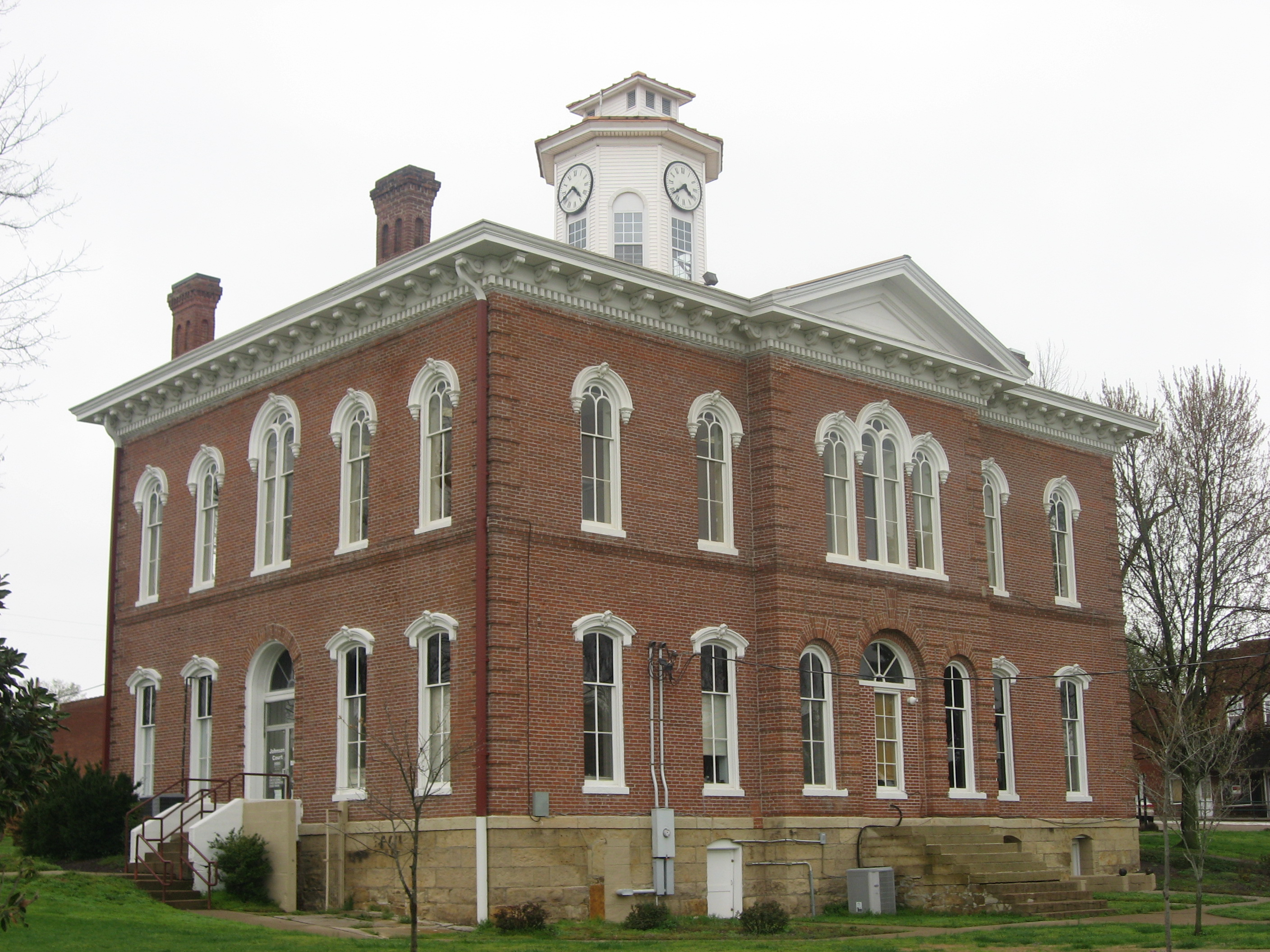
- Johnson County Courthouse in Vienna

- Location within the U.S. state of Illinois
- Coordinates: 37°28′N 88°52′W
- Country: United States
- State: Illinois
- Founded: 1812
- Named for: Richard Mentor Johnson
- Seat: Vienna
- Largest city: Vienna

Area
  - Total: 349 sq mi (900 km^{2})
  - Land: 344 sq mi (890 km^{2})
  - Water: 4.9 sq mi (13 km^{2}) 1.4%

Population (2020)
  - Total: 13,308
  - Estimate (2025): 13,363 ▲
  - Density: 38.7/sq mi (14.9/km^{2})
- Time zone: UTC−6 (Central)
  - Summer (DST): UTC−5 (CDT)
- Congressional district: 12th

Johnson County is a county in the U.S. state of Illinois. According to the 2020 census, it has a population of 13,308. Its county seat is Vienna. It is located in the southern portion of Illinois known locally as "Little Egypt".

== History ==
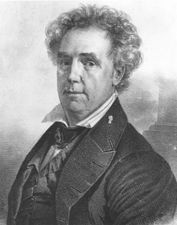
Richard M. Johnson

Johnson County was organized in 1812 out of Randolph County. It was named for Richard Mentor Johnson, who was then a U.S. Congressman from Kentucky. In 1813, Johnson commanded a Kentucky regiment at the Battle of the Thames, after which he claimed to have killed Tecumseh in hand-to-hand combat. Johnson went on to become Vice President of the United States.

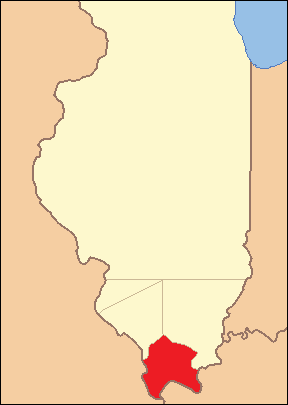
Johnson County at the time of its creation to 1816

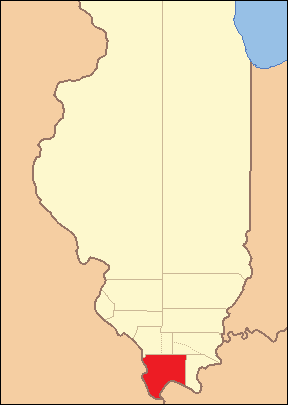
Johnson County between 1816 and 1818

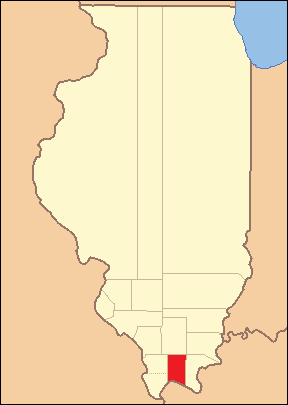
Johnson County between 1818 and 1843

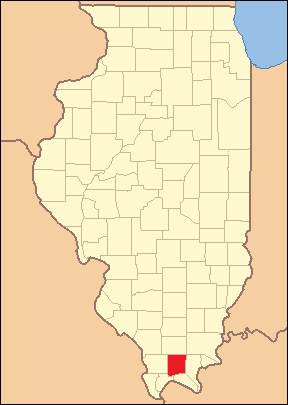
Johnson County in 1843, when it was reduced to its present size

== Geography ==
According to the U.S. Census Bureau, the county has a total area of 349 square miles (900 km^{2}), of which 344 square miles (890 km^{2}) is land and 4.9 square miles (13 km^{2}) (1.4%) is water.

=== Climate and weather ===
Vienna, Illinois

Climate chart (precipitation, max. and min. temperature)
J	F	M	A	M	J	J	A	S	O	N	D
3.4 43 25	3.4 50 29	4.6 60 38	4.7 71 46	5.2 79 55	4.1 87 63	3.8 90 67	3.6 90 65	3.3 84 58	3.2 73 47	4.7 59 39	4.4 47 29
- █ Average max. and min. temperatures in °F
- █ Precipitation totals in inches
- Source: The Weather Channel
Metric conversion
J	F	M	A	M	J	J	A	S	O	N	D
86 6 −4	86 10 −2	117 16 3	120 22 8	131 26 13	104 31 17	95 32 19	91 32 18	83 29 14	80 23 8	120 15 4	112 8 −2
- █ Average max. and min. temperatures in °C
- █ Precipitation totals in mm

In recent years, average temperatures in the county seat of Vienna have ranged from a low of 25 °F (−4 °C) in January to a high of 90 °F (32 °C) in July, although a record low of −20 °F (−29 °C) was recorded in January 1977 and a record high of 103 °F (39 °C) was recorded in August 2007. Average monthly precipitation ranged from 3.16 inches (80 mm) in October to 5.16 inches (131 mm) in May.

=== Major highways ===
- Interstate 24
- Interstate 57
- U.S. Route 45
- Illinois Route 37
- Illinois Route 146
- Illinois Route 147
- Illinois Route 166

=== Transit ===
- List of intercity bus stops in Illinois

=== Adjacent counties ===
- Williamson County - north
- Saline County - northeast
- Pope County - east
- Massac County - southeast
- Pulaski County - southwest
- Union County - west

=== National protected areas ===
- Cypress Creek National Wildlife Refuge (part)
- Shawnee National Forest (part)

== Demographics ==
Historical population
Census	Pop.	Note	%±
1820	843		—
1830	1,596		89.3%
1840	3,626		127.2%
1850	4,114		13.5%
1860	9,342		127.1%
1870	11,248		20.4%
1880	13,078		16.3%
1890	15,013		14.8%
1900	15,667		4.4%
1910	14,331		−8.5%
1920	12,022		−16.1%
1930	10,203		−15.1%
1940	10,727		5.1%
1950	8,729		−18.6%
1960	6,928		−20.6%
1970	7,550		9.0%
1980	9,624		27.5%
1990	11,347		17.9%
2000	12,878		13.5%
2010	12,582		−2.3%
2020	13,308		5.8%
2025 (est.)	13,363	▲	0.4%
U.S. Decennial Census; 1790-1960 1900-1990; 1990-2000 2010

2000 census age pyramid for Johnson County, skewed toward male because of the Vienna Correctional Center, an Illinois State Prison for men.

=== 2020 census ===
As of the 2020 census, the county had a population of 13,308. The median age was 42.8 years, 17.4% of residents were under the age of 18, and 20.1% of residents were 65 years of age or older. For every 100 females there were 142.4 males, and for every 100 females age 18 and over there were 151.7 males age 18 and over.

The racial makeup of the county was 82.5% White, 10.8% Black or African American, 0.2% American Indian and Alaska Native, 0.2% Asian, <0.1% Native Hawaiian or Pacific Islander, 3.1% from some other race, and 3.2% from two or more races. Hispanic or Latino residents of any race comprised 4.1% of the population.

Less than 0.1% of residents lived in urban areas, while 100.0% lived in rural areas.

There were 4,577 households in the county, of which 26.8% had children under the age of 18 living in them. Of all households, 53.2% were married-couple households, 17.5% were households with a male householder and no spouse or partner present, and 23.7% were households with a female householder and no spouse or partner present. About 27.6% of all households were made up of individuals and 14.8% had someone living alone who was 65 years of age or older.

There were 5,526 housing units, of which 17.2% were vacant. Among occupied housing units, 81.6% were owner-occupied and 18.4% were renter-occupied. The homeowner vacancy rate was 2.1% and the rental vacancy rate was 8.4%.

=== Racial and ethnic composition ===
Johnson County, Illinois – Racial and ethnic composition Note: the US Census treats Hispanic/Latino as an ethnic category. This table excludes Latinos from the racial categories and assigns them to a separate category. Hispanics/Latinos may be of any race.
Race / Ethnicity (NH = Non-Hispanic)	Pop 1980	Pop 1990	Pop 2000	Pop 2010	Pop 2020	% 1980	% 1990	% 2000	% 2010	% 2020
White alone (NH)	9,156	10,076	10,553	11,056	10,895	95.14%	88.80%	81.95%	87.87%	81.87%
Black or African American alone (NH)	353	1,042	1,821	1,004	1,419	3.67%	9.18%	14.14%	7.98%	10.66%
Native American or Alaska Native alone (NH)	16	26	34	19	20	0.17%	0.23%	0.26%	0.15%	0.15%
Asian alone (NH)	10	13	17	21	18	0.10%	0.11%	0.13%	0.17%	0.14%
Native Hawaiian or Pacific Islander alone (NH)	x	x	0	1	4	x	x	0.00%	0.01%	0.03%
Other race alone (NH)	7	1	0	4	12	0.07%	0.01%	0.00%	0.03%	0.09%
Mixed race or Multiracial (NH)	x	x	85	101	388	x	x	0.66%	0.80%	2.92%
Hispanic or Latino (any race)	82	189	368	376	552	0.85%	1.67%	2.86%	2.99%	4.15%
Total	9,624	11,347	12,878	12,582	13,308	100.00%	100.00%	100.00%	100.00%	100.00%

=== 2010 census ===
As of the 2010 census, there were 12,582 people, 4,584 households, and 3,270 families residing in the county. The population density was 36.6 inhabitants per square mile (14.1/km^{2}). There were 5,598 housing units at an average density of 16.3 per square mile (6.3/km^{2}).

The racial makeup of the county was 89.0% white, 8.0% black or African American, 0.2% Asian, 0.2% American Indian, 0.0% Native Hawaiian or Pacific Islander, 1.6% from other races, and 1.0% from two or more races. Those of Hispanic or Latino origin made up 3.0% of the population.

In terms of ancestry, 17.6% were German, 11.5% were Irish, 10.9% were English, and 6.5% were American.

Of the 4,584 households, 28.8% had children under the age of 18 living with them, 59.2% were married couples living together, 8.3% had a female householder with no husband present, 28.7% were non-families, and 25.3% of all households were made up of individuals. The average household size was 2.41 and the average family size was 2.85. The median age was 42.2 years.

The median income for a household in the county was $41,619 and the median income for a family was $47,423. Males had a median income of $48,047 versus $30,904 for females. The per capita income for the county was $16,402, the lowest of all 102 counties in Illinois and 57th in the U.S. About 11.1% of families and 13.6% of the population were below the poverty line, including 19.0% of those under age 18 and 10.7% of those age 65 or over.

== Communities ==
=== Cities ===
- Marion (mostly in Williamson County)
- Vienna

=== Villages ===
- Belknap
- Buncombe
- Cypress
- Goreville
- New Burnside
- Simpson

=== Unincorporated communities ===
- Bloomfield
- Dixon Springs
- Elvira
- Ganntown
- Grantsburg
- Ozark
- Parker City
- Pleasant Grove
- Pond
- Reevesville
- Reynoldsburg
- Tunnel Hill
- West Vienna
- White Hill

== Politics ==
In its early days Johnson County, being strongly Southern in its culture, was fiercely Democratic. In fact, in the 1860 presidential election, the county gave Illinois native and Northern Democrat Stephen A. Douglas a higher proportion of its votes than any other county in the United States.

However, during the Civil War, under the influence of Congressman John Logan, this region of dubious initial loyalty was to provide a number of Union soldiers rivaled on a per capita basis only by a few Unionist counties in Appalachia. This level of Union service has meant that despite its historic hostility towards Yankee culture, Johnson County has been Republican ever since the Civil War. Douglas in 1860 remains the last Democrat to win a majority of the county's vote: the solitary Democratic victory since was when Bill Clinton won a plurality against Republican George H. W. Bush and independent Ross Perot.

United States presidential election results for Johnson County, Illinois
Year	Republican		Democratic		Third party(ies)	
Year	No.	%	No.	%	No.	%
1892	1,716	55.41%	854	27.58%	527	17.02%
1896	2,027	58.18%	1,429	41.02%	28	0.80%
1900	1,940	59.02%	1,271	38.67%	76	2.31%
1904	2,164	65.16%	980	29.51%	177	5.33%
1908	1,913	62.27%	1,055	34.34%	104	3.39%
1912	1,025	35.07%	952	32.57%	946	32.36%
1916	3,273	62.58%	1,822	34.84%	135	2.58%
1920	2,972	70.91%	1,137	27.13%	82	1.96%
1924	2,468	60.59%	1,408	34.57%	197	4.84%
1928	2,892	70.69%	1,163	28.43%	36	0.88%
1932	2,424	49.87%	2,387	49.11%	50	1.03%
1936	3,537	58.46%	2,497	41.27%	16	0.26%
1940	3,827	62.80%	2,254	36.99%	13	0.21%
1944	3,298	68.24%	1,522	31.49%	13	0.27%
1948	2,778	64.47%	1,510	35.04%	21	0.49%
1952	3,327	67.25%	1,614	32.63%	6	0.12%
1956	2,973	65.72%	1,549	34.24%	2	0.04%
1960	2,778	66.19%	1,413	33.67%	6	0.14%
1964	2,217	55.61%	1,770	44.39%	0	0.00%
1968	2,406	60.53%	1,143	28.75%	426	10.72%
1972	2,826	68.54%	1,293	31.36%	4	0.10%
1976	2,417	52.23%	2,182	47.15%	29	0.63%
1980	3,201	65.49%	1,586	32.45%	101	2.07%
1984	3,424	67.36%	1,647	32.40%	12	0.24%
1988	2,797	59.61%	1,872	39.90%	23	0.49%
1992	2,124	39.40%	2,299	42.65%	968	17.96%
1996	2,241	45.46%	2,009	40.75%	680	13.79%
2000	3,285	61.26%	1,928	35.96%	149	2.78%
2004	3,997	68.15%	1,813	30.91%	55	0.94%
2008	3,912	66.15%	1,871	31.64%	131	2.22%
2012	3,963	69.60%	1,572	27.61%	159	2.79%
2016	4,649	76.35%	1,142	18.76%	298	4.89%
2020	5,059	78.43%	1,281	19.86%	110	1.71%
2024	4,798	78.62%	1,241	20.33%	64	1.05%

== Education ==
School districts include:

K-12:

- Century Community Unit School District 100
- Goreville Community Unit School District 1
- Marion Community Unit School District 2

Secondary:

- Vienna High School District 133

Elementary:

- Buncombe Consolidated School District 43
- Cypress School District 64
- New Simpson Hill Consolidated District 32
- Vienna School District 55

== See also ==
- National Register of Historic Places listings in Johnson County, Illinois
