= Millstone Bluff =

Archaeological site in Illinois, United States

- U.S. National Register of Historic Places
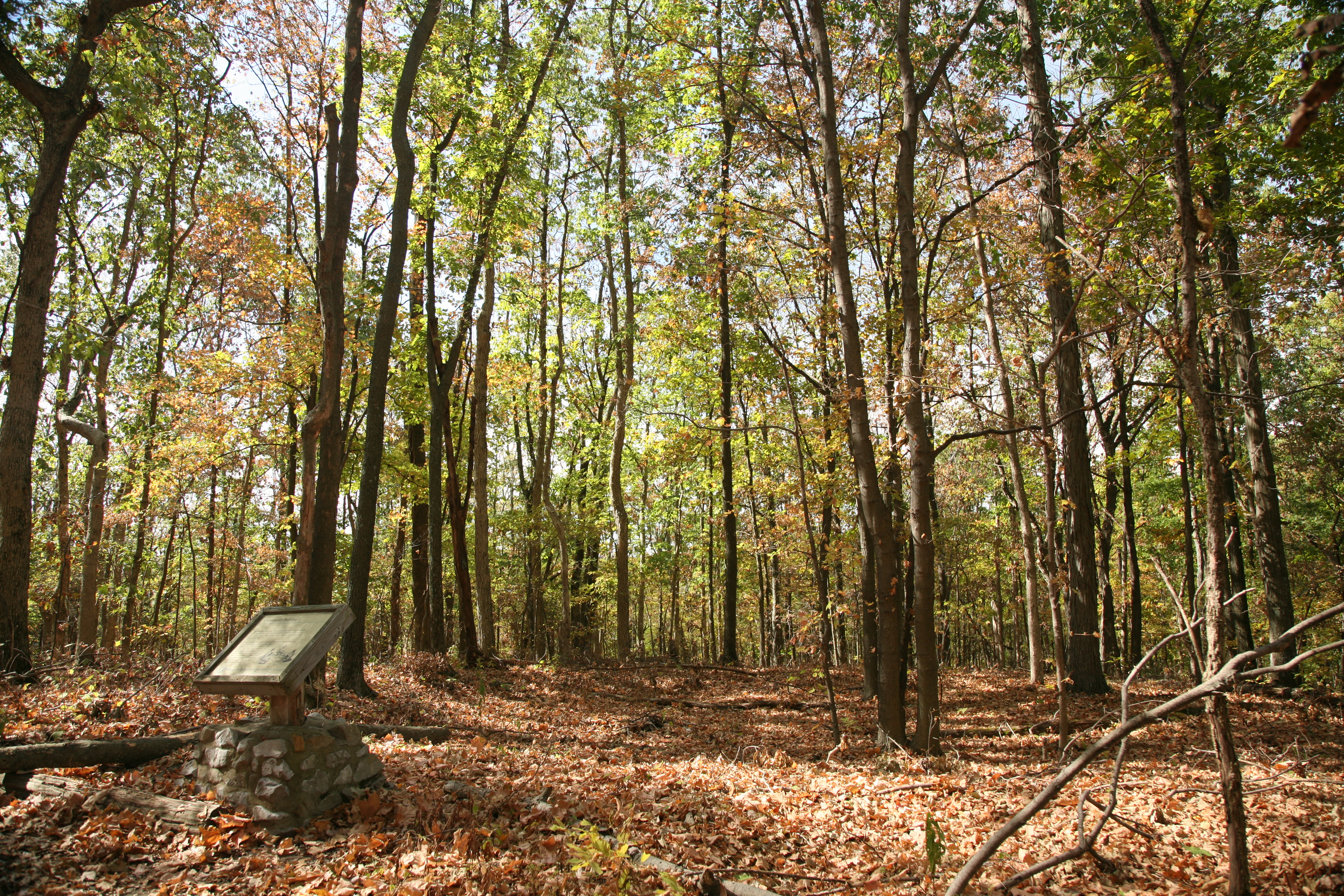
- Soil depressions indicate the location of houses
- Location: Illinois Route 147 west of its junction with Illinois Route 145
- Nearest city: Glendale, Illinois
- Coordinates: 37°28′1″N 88°41′17″W
- Area: 418 acres (169 ha)
- Built: c. 1492-1540
- NRHP reference No.: 73000716
- Added to NRHP: October 15, 1973

Millstone Bluff is a natural bluff in Pope County, Illinois, United States, located near the community of Glendale. Listed on the National Register of Historic Places because of its archaeological significance, Millstone Bluff is one of three National Register sites in Pope County, along with the Golconda Historic District and part of the Kincaid Mounds State Historic Site.

The bluff is home to a prehistoric Native American settlement used by Mississippian cultures. The settlement site is little more than depressions sitting atop the bluff, which lies within the Shawnee National Forest. The United States Forest Service controls an interpretive trail to the site. Aside from the remains of the Mississippian settlement, the bluff contains a prehistoric stone box cemetery, a rock art site, and a Late Woodland stone fort.

Petroglyphs at this site include two thunderbirds, pipes, axes, a spider-like creature, turkey tracks, a humanoid form, and the cross and circle motif common to other petroglyph sites in southern Illinois.

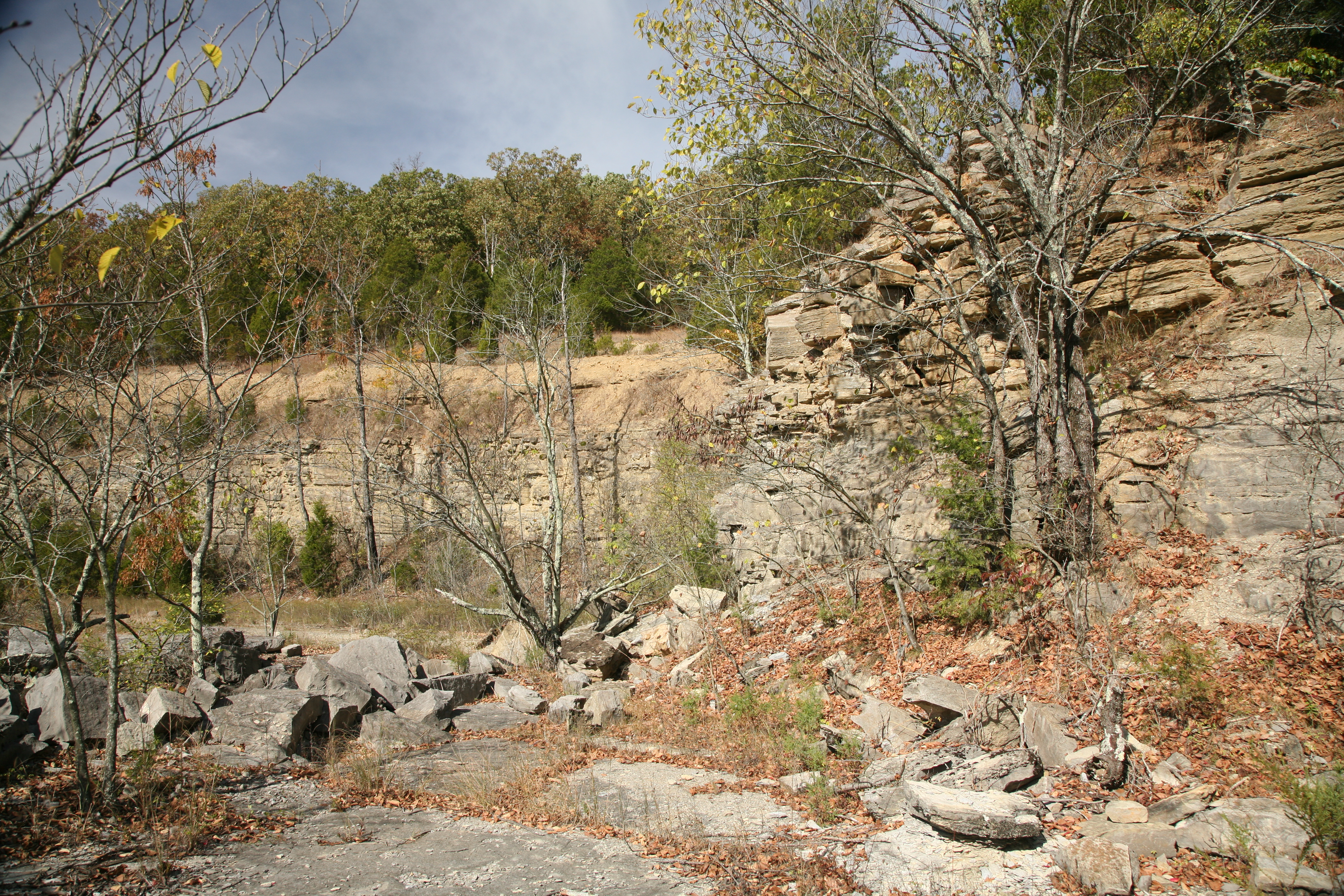
Early American settlers used the bluff as a millstone quarry.

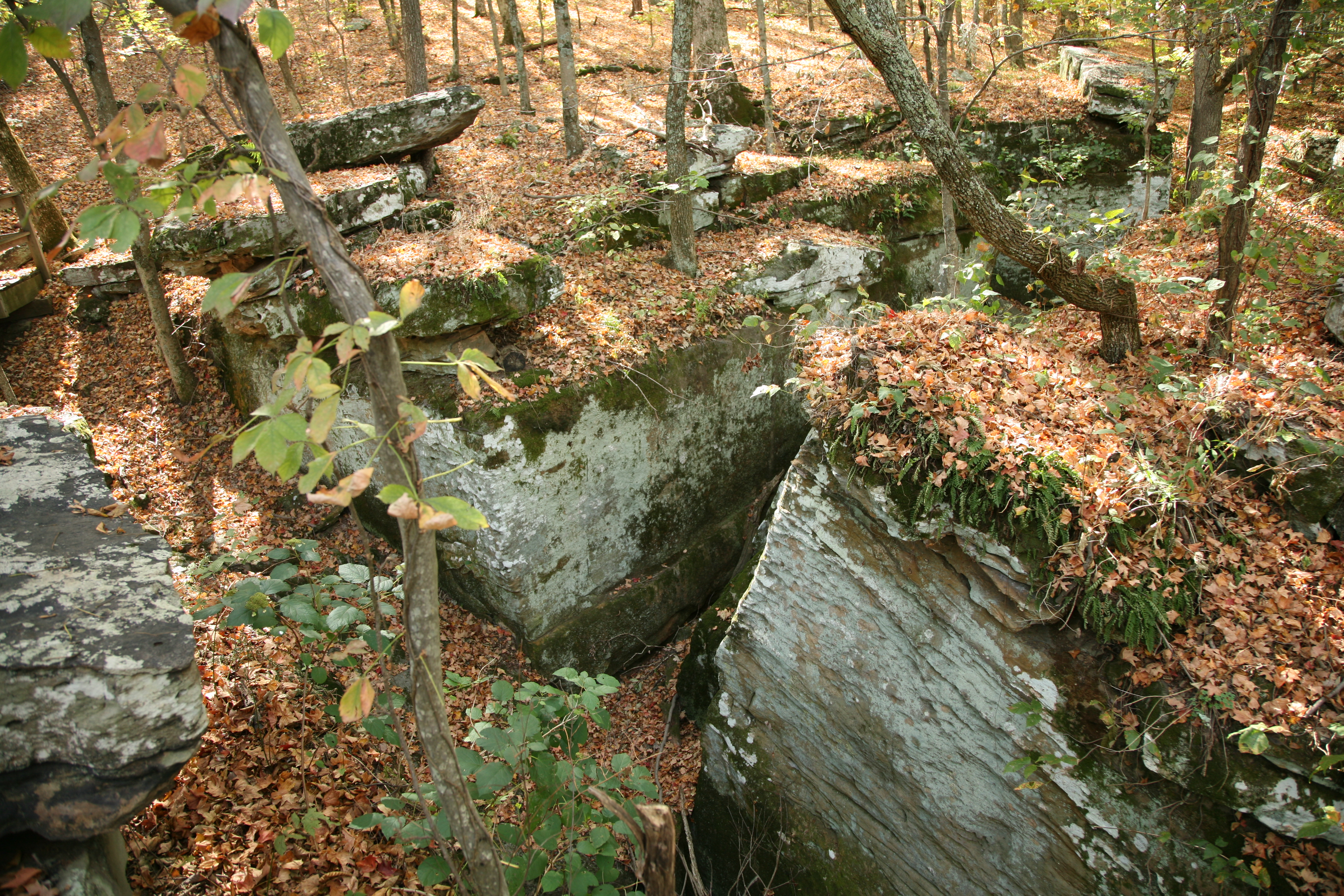
Petroglyph site on the northeast edge of the bluff

== See also ==
- List of archaeological sites on the National Register of Historic Places in Illinois
