= Dickason =

Dickason is an English patronymic surname, a variant form of Dickerson, meaning "son of Dick" (a medieval pet form of the given name Richard). Notable people with the surname include:

- Gladys Dickason (1903–1971), American labor economist
- Harry Dickason (gymnast) (1890–1962), British Olympic gymnast
- Harry Dickason (seaman) (1884–1943), English seaman
- Harry Dickason (Royal Navy sailor) (1884–1943), English Royal Navy sailor and Antarctic explorer
- Henry Lake Dickason (1886–1957), the president of Bluefield State College in West Virginia
- Olive Dickason CM (1920–2011), Métis Canadian historian and journalist

== See also ==
- Dickson (disambiguation)
- Dikson (disambiguation)
