= Dixson =

Dixson is a surname. Notable people with the surname include:

- Adrienne Dixson, American educational theorist
- Alice Dixson (born 1969), Filipino American actress, commercial model, and former beauty queen
- Daryus Dixson (born 2006), American football player
- Hugh Dixson (1841–1926), Australian business man and philanthropist
- Hugh Robert Dixson (1865–1940), Australian businessman, parliamentarian and philanthropist
- Julius Dixson (1913–2004), African-American songwriter and record company executive
- Miriam Dixson (born 1930), Australian social historian and author
- Robert James Dixson (1908–1963), American writer, simplified and adapted some classic works of literature
- Thomas Dixson (1733–1809), British colonial militiaman and politician serving in Canada
- Darius Scott, also known as Dixson (singer), American musician

== See also ==
- Dixson Island (Antarctica)
- Dickson (disambiguation)
- Dixon (disambiguation)
