= U.S. Route 45 in Illinois =

US Highway in Illinois

U.S. Route 45
- US 45 highlighted in red

Route information
- Maintained by IDOT
- Length: 428.99 mi (690.39 km)

Major junctions
- South end: US 45 near Brookport
- I-24 in Metropolis; I-64 near Mill Shoals; US 50 in Flora; I-70 / US 40 in Effingham; I-74 in Urbana; I-57 in Kankakee; US 30 in Frankfort; I-80 in Tinley Park; US 6 in Orland Park; I-55 in Hodgkins
- North end: US 45 near Antioch

Location
- Country: United States
- State: Illinois
- Counties: Massac, Johnson, Williamson, Saline, Gallatin, White, Wayne, Clay, Effingham, Shelby, Cumberland, Coles, Douglas, Champaign, Ford, Iroquois, Kankakee, Will, Cook, Lake

Highway system
- United States Numbered Highway System; List; Special; Divided; Illinois State Highway System; Interstate; US; State; Tollways; Scenic
← IL 43	→ IL 47
← IL 45	IL 46	→ IL 47
← US 51	IL 51	→ US 52

U.S. Route 45 (US 45) in the state of Illinois is a major north–south U.S. Highway that runs from the Brookport Bridge over the Ohio River at Brookport north through rural sections of eastern Illinois and then through the suburbs of Chicago to the Wisconsin state line east of Antioch. This is a distance of 428.99 miles (690.39 km). US 45 is the longest numbered route in Illinois.

== Route description ==
=== Southern Illinois ===
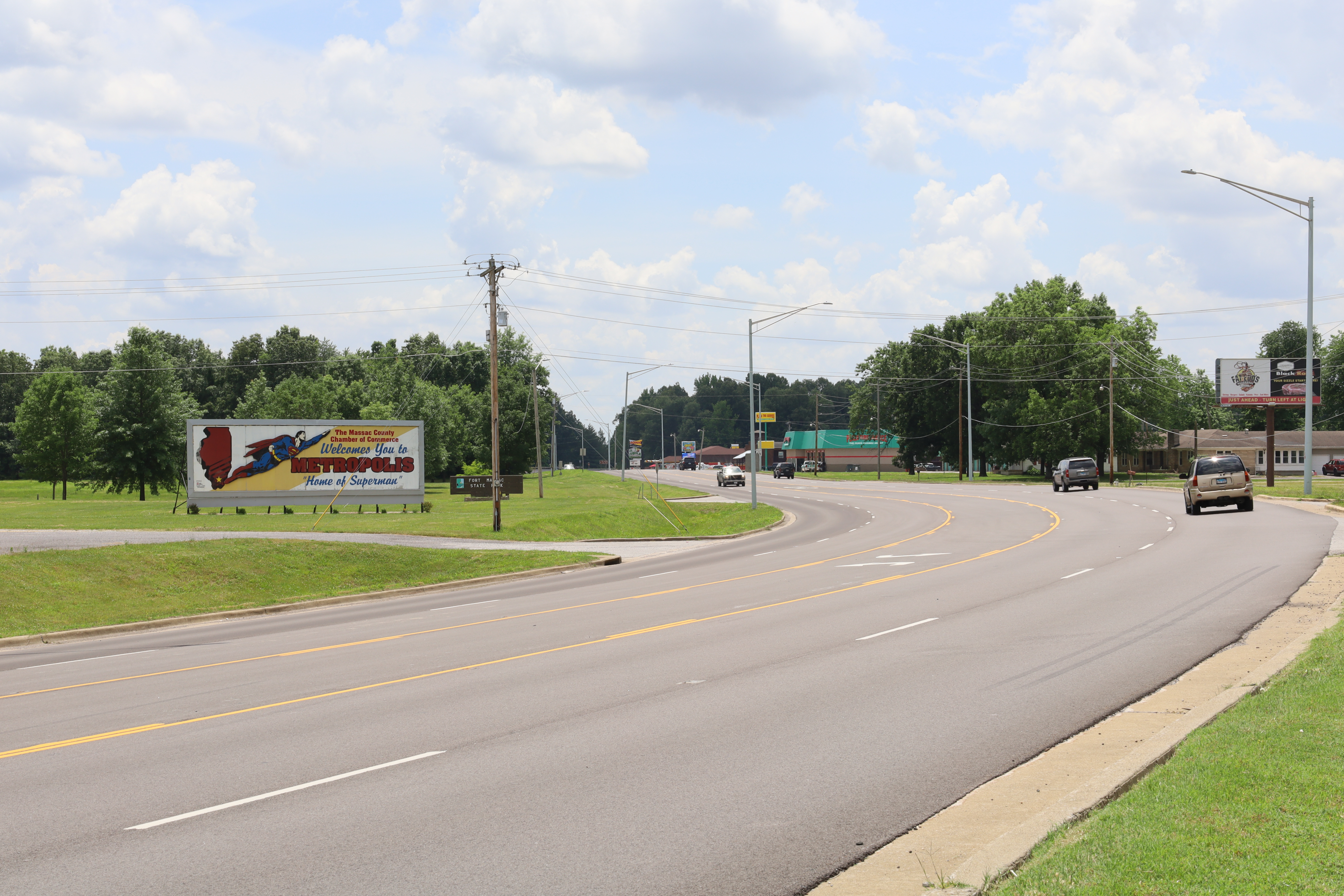
The highway passes a "Home of Superman" sign as it enters Metropolis, Illinois

The route crosses the Ohio River over the Brookport Bridge, and then curves to the west to travel through downtown Metropolis. It continues northwest to Vienna, after which it turns to the northeast.

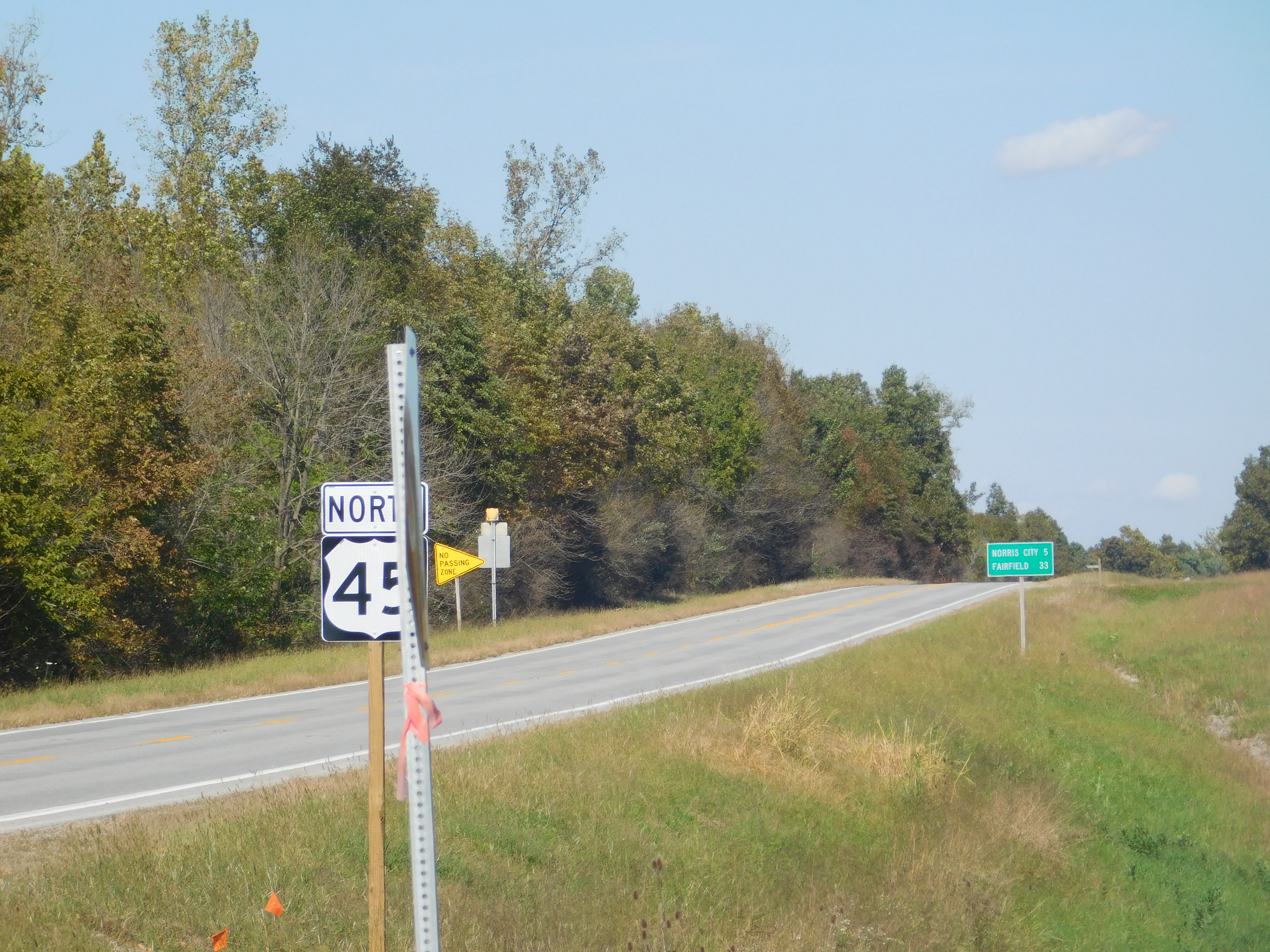
US 45 north of IL 141

=== Champaign/Urbana ===
US 45 serves as the western boundary of the University of Illinois at Urbana–Champaign campus. Entering downtown Champaign as Neil Street, US 45 then goes east on Springfield Avenue, running concurrently with US 150. Farther east of downtown Champaign, it again serves as a boundary for the campus. Following Wright Street, US 45 then moves east on University Avenue, forming the northern border of the University. This path continues to Cunningham Avenue in Urbana. US 45 then turns onto Cunningham Avenue northward towards Chicago.

=== Kankakee to Hickory Hills ===
US 45 overlaps US 52 at an intersection with Illinois 49 east of Ashkum. US 45/52 intersects with Illinois Route 17 in Kankakee and Illinois Route 102 in Bourbonnais. Just west of Peotone, US 52 takes a westward course, and US 45 heads north. From this point on until its intersection with Cermak Road/22nd Street in Westchester, US 45 is also known as La Grange Road.

In Frankfort, US 45 intersects with US 30. From that point on until its interchange with Archer Avenue/Illinois Route 171, US 45/La Grange Road is also known as 96th Avenue (9600 W in Chicago's street grid, 96 blocks and 12 miles (19 km) west of State Street). During this stretch it intersects with Interstate 80 and US 6/159th Street in Orland Park. It also intersects Illinois Route 83 (Calumet Sag Road) for the first time in Palos Hills, just south of the Cal-Sag Channel.

Starting at 95th Street near Hickory Hills, US 45 becomes concurrent US 12 and US 20. Two miles further north, at Archer, the road loses its 96th Avenue designation; this is due to the road entering suburbs that do not use Chicago's address system, and that most of its alignment north of Archer would be at 10000 W anyway, if the address system extended to these suburbs.

=== Hickory Hills to O'Hare International Airport ===
The concurrent US 12/20/45, past 87th Street, briefly becomes a 4-lane freeway as it intersects with Illinois Route 171 (Archer Avenue) in Justice and Interstate 55 (the Stevenson Expressway) in Hodgkins (along with Interstate 294, which only has a southbound interchange ramp). North of Interstate 55, US 12/20/45 becomes a regular 4-lane highway before it intersects with the former US 66 at Joliet Road in Countryside.

In Downtown La Grange, US 12/20/45 intersects the Burlington Northern/Santa Fe railroad tracks and intersects with US 34 (Ogden Avenue), possibly the only intersection of 4 separate US routes in Illinois.

Following the intersection with US 34, US 12/20/45 passes through La Grange Park (as La Grange Road), moving in a slight northwesterly direction. After passing over Salt Creek, US 12/20/45 intersects with Cermak Road/22nd Street in Westchester and is known as Mannheim Road north of this intersection. Mannheim Road, as US 12/20/45 serves as the Eastern starting point for Illinois Route 38 (Roosevelt Road) in Hillside, has a full interchange with Interstate 290, also in Hillside, and serves as the Eastern starting point for Illinois Route 56 (briefly Washington Boulevard in Bellwood, before becoming Butterfield Road).

After passing over a Union Pacific rail yard, US 45 becomes concurrent with only US 12 in Melrose Park as US 20 breaks off at Lake Street there. US 12 and US 45 remain concurrent on Mannheim Road, passing Interstate 294 again without an interchange, but, after passing Illinois Route 19 (Irving Park Road), has a full interchange with Interstate 190, which leads directly to O'Hare International Airport or Interstate 90 East (into Chicago). This area between IL19 and IL72 once ran straight though but was realigned to the east in 1960 for the construction of O'Hare's 4R/22L runway.

=== O'Hare International Airport to Antioch ===
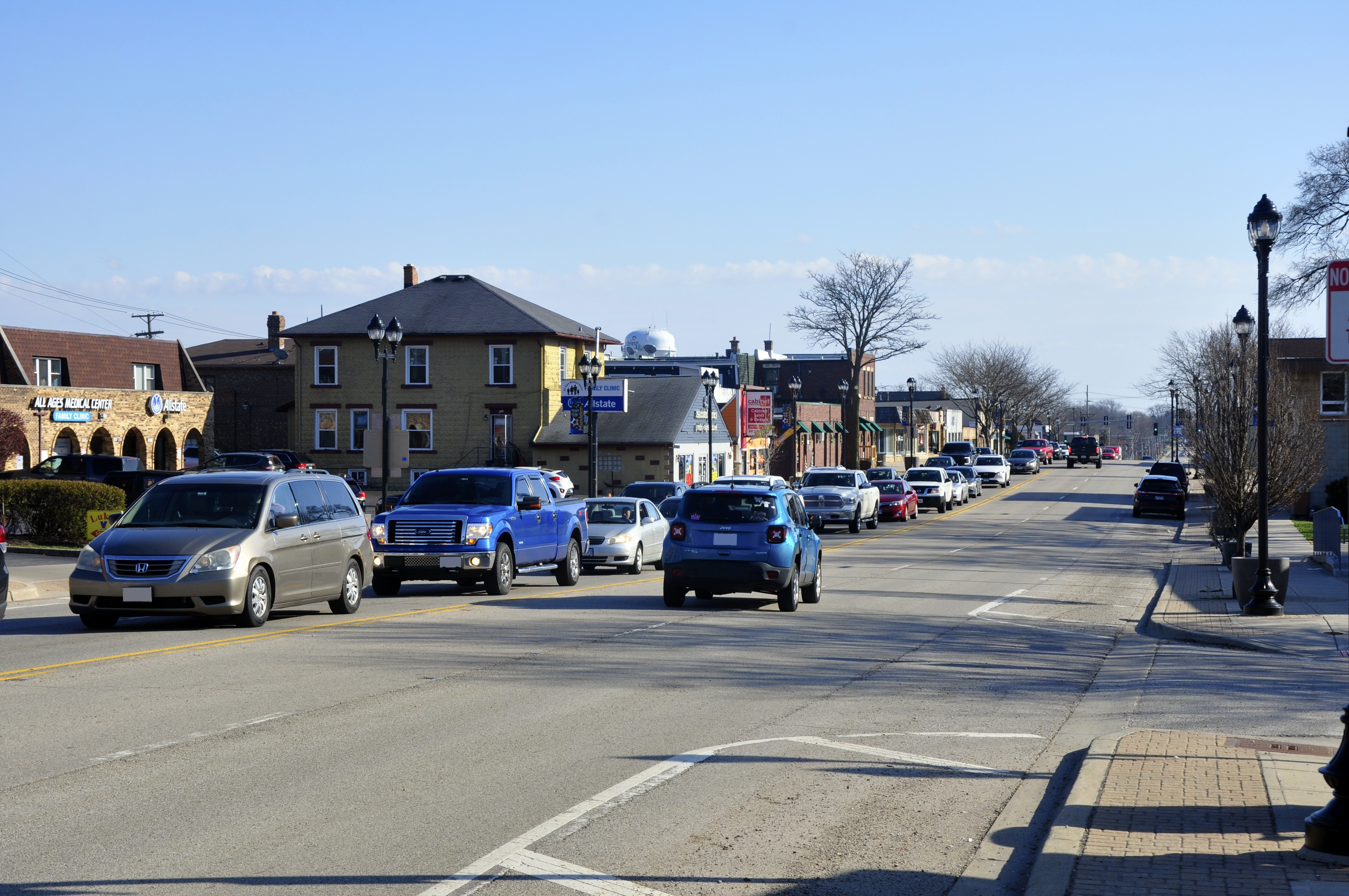
US Route 45 in Mundelein, Illinois

Near the Northeast portion of O'Hare airport, US 12/45 intersects with Illinois Route 72 in Rosemont, IL, and continues along Mannheim Road into Des Plaines. Mannheim Road ends and feeds into Lee Street at the end of an S-curve. The northbound and southbound routes are split in downtown Des Plaines between Lee Street (West 12/North 45) and Graceland Avenue (East 12/South 45). During this time, US 12/45 intersects with US 14 (Miner Street) at two separate points, due to the separation of their directions.

Just north of US 14, US 12/45 are reunited in both directions on Lee Street, only to be separated as US 12 diverges onto Rand Road and US 45 becomes Des Plaines River Road in a complicated intersection on the north side of Des Plaines, just south of Illinois Route 58.

US 45 continues along Des Plaines River Road, intersecting with Illinois 58 in Des Plaines, and eventually becomes concurrent with Illinois Route 21, Milwaukee Avenue, in Prospect Heights, until Lincolnshire (just north of Illinois Route 22) where US 45 takes a northwest route.

US 45 also intersects with Illinois Route 83 just south of Mundelein (where they exchange routes, as IL 83 goes northwest, and US 45 continues north), Illinois Route 60 in Mundelein, Illinois Route 137 in Libertyville, Illinois Route 120 in Grayslake, and Illinois Route 173 just south of the Wisconsin border.

== History ==
Initially, US 45 ran from Metropolis to Des Plaines, Illinois, with some portions under construction. In 1929, a ferry that once crossed the Ohio River closed in favor of opening Brookport Bridge. By 1930, most of the sections were finished and then opened to traffic. The original alignment followed (from south–north) what used to be part of IL 1, IL 140, IL 25, IL 44, IL 51, and IL 46 before terminating at US 12. These state routes were eventually either truncated or removed as of 1935. That same year, US 45 was extended north from Des Plaines, Illinois to Michigan. In 1936, a new bridge crossing the Des Plaines River, Chicago Sanitary and Ship Canal, and the Illinois and Michigan Canal opened. As a result, US 45 moved off from another bridge carrying Willow Springs Road. In 1940, US 45 was rerouted to branch off west from Half Day instead of branching off north of Libertyville.

In 1954, a portion of US 45 south of Kankakee moved eastward, resulting in the extension of IL 115. In 1962, another portion of US 45 east of O'Hare Field moved slightly eastward. In 1969, a portion of Interstate 57 east of Kankakee was extended south to US 54 west of Onarga. As a result, US 45 moved away from Clifton and Chebanse.

In October 2019, the 4-lane Millburn Bypass opened in order to reduce congestion in and near Millburn.

== Major intersections ==
All exits are unnumbered.

County	Location	mi	km	Destinations	Notes
Ohio River		0.0	0.0	US 45 south – Paducah	Continuation into Kentucky
Ohio River		0.0	0.0	Brookport Bridge	
Massac	Metropolis	5.1	8.2	IL 145 north – Harrisburg	
Massac	Metropolis	5.5	8.9	I-24 – Paducah, Interstate 57	I-24 exit 37
Massac		21.4	34.4	IL 169 west (Karnak Road) – Karnak	
Johnson	Vienna	30.5	49.1	IL 146 (Vine Street) – Anna	
Johnson		32.8	52.8	I-24 – Interstate 57, Paducah	I-24 exit 14
Johnson		45.2	72.7	IL 166 north – Creal Springs	
Williamson	No major junctions				
Saline	Harrisburg	62.0	99.8	IL 145 south / IL 34 south – Rosiclare, Metropolis	Southern end of IL 34 concurrency
Saline	Harrisburg	63.2	101.7	IL 13 / IL 34 west – Marion, Shawneetown	Northern end of IL 34 concurrency
Saline	Eldorado	70.2	113.0	IL 142 (State Street) – McLeansboro, Equality	
Gallatin–White county line		79.1	127.3	IL 141 east – Omaha	
White	Norris City	83.3	134.1	IL 1 – Carmi, Omaha	
White		91.6	147.4	IL 14 – McLeansboro, Carmi	
Wayne	Mill Shoals	104.7	168.5	I-64 – Evansville, Mount Vernon	I-64 exit 110
Wayne	Fairfield	112.7	181.4	IL 15 east (Main Street) – Albion	Southern end of IL 15 concurrency
Wayne	Fairfield	115.2	185.4	IL 15 west – Mount Vernon	Northern end of IL 15 concurrency
Clay		137.5	221.3	US 50 east – Olney	Southern end of US 50 concurrency
Clay		141.3	227.4	US 50 west – Salem	Northern end of US 50 concurrency
Effingham		165.9	267.0	IL 37 south – Watson	
Effingham	Effingham	172.5	277.6	US 40 west / IL 33 (Fayette Avenue west)	Southern end of US 40 concurrency
Effingham	Effingham	172.8	278.1	US 40 east / IL 33 (Fayette Avenue east)	Northern end of US 40 concurrency
Effingham	Effingham	174.6	281.0	I-57 / I-70 – Champaign, Terre Haute, Mount Vernon, East St. Louis	I-57 exit 162
Shelby	No major junctions				
Cumberland		188.9	304.0	I-57 – Effingham, Champaign	I-57 exit 177
Cumberland		192.5	309.8	IL 121 south – Toledo	Southern end of IL 121 concurrency
Coles	Mattoon	197.1	317.2	I-57 – Champaign, Effingham	I-57 exit 184
Coles	Mattoon	201.0	323.5	IL 16 east – Charleston	Southern end of IL 16 concurrency; serves Sarah Bush Lincoln Health Center
Coles	Mattoon	201.0	323.5	IL 16 west – Shelbyville, Driver Services Facility	Northern end of IL 16 concurrency
Coles	Mattoon	201.6	324.4	IL 121 north (DeWitt Avenue west)	Northern end of IL 121 concurrency
Coles				CR 18 (Mattoon-Charleston Enterprise Parkway) to I-57	Interchange via connector road
Douglas	Arcola	215.5	346.8	IL 133 (Springfield Road) – Lovington, Paris	
Douglas	Tuscola	223.2	359.2	US 36 (Southline Road) – Decatur, Indianapolis	
Champaign	Pesotum	231.4	372.4	I-57 – Effingham, Champaign	I-57 exit 220
Champaign	Champaign	245.9	395.7	US 150 west (Springfield Avenue)	Southern end of US 150 concurrency
Champaign	Urbana	248.2	399.4	US 150 east (University Avenue)	Northern end of US 150 concurrency
Champaign	Urbana	249.6	401.7	I-74 – Danville, Bloomington	I-74 exit 184
Champaign	Rantoul	262.2	422.0	US 136 (Champaign Avenue)	
Ford	Paxton	273.1	439.5	IL 9 west (Patton Street)	Southern end of IL 9 concurrency
Ford	Paxton	273.4	440.0	IL 9 east (Pells Street)	Northern end of IL 9 concurrency
Iroquois	Onarga	291.6	469.3	IL 54 west – Roberts	
Iroquois	Gilman	294.6	474.1	US 24 west – Chatsworth	Southern end of US 24 concurrency
Iroquois	Gilman	296.4	477.0	US 24 east – Watseka	Northern end of US 24 concurrency
Iroquois	Ashkum	304.8	490.5	IL 116 west to I-57 – Pontiac	
Iroquois		309.4	497.9	US 52 east / IL 49 south – Sheldon, Rankin	Southern end of US 52 concurrency; northern terminus of IL 49
Kankakee	Kankakee	322.5	519.0	I-57 – Chicago, Champaign	I-57 exit 308
Kankakee	Kankakee	324.4	522.1	IL 50 north	
Kankakee	Kankakee	325.1	523.2	IL 115 south (McMullin Drive south)	
Kankakee	Kankakee	325.7	524.2	IL 17 east (Court Street east) – Momence	Southern end of IL 17 concurrency
Kankakee	Kankakee	326.1	524.8	IL 17 west (Court Street west)	Northern end of IL 17 concurrency
Kankakee	Bourbonnais	328.5	528.7	IL 102 west (Main Street NW)	
Will	Peotone	342.3	550.9	US 52 west / CR 20 east (West Joliet Road) – Joliet	Northern end of US 52 concurrency; western terminus of CR 20
Will	Frankfort	353.4	568.7	US 30 / Lincoln Highway	
Will	Mokena–Orland Park– Tinley Park tripoint	356.7	574.1	I-80 – Indiana, Joliet	I-80 exit 145
Cook	Orland Park	360.1	579.5	US 6 (159th Street)	
Cook	Orland Park	362.5	583.4	IL 7 (Southwest Highway)	Access via 135th and 143rd Streets
Cook	Palos Park	365.8	588.7	IL 83 (Calumet Sag Road)	Interchange
Cook	Oak Lawn	368.2	592.6	US 12 east / US 20 east (95th Street)	Southern end of US 12 & US 20 concurrency
Cook	Willow Springs	370.1	595.6	IL 171 (Archer Avenue) to 79th Street / I-294 Toll south (Tri-State Tollway) – Indiana	Cloverleaf interchange; left exit southbound
Cook	Hodgkins–Countryside line	371.6	598.0	I-55 (Stevenson Expressway) to I-294 Toll north – Chicago, St. Louis	Cloverleaf interchange; I-55 exit 279
Cook	Hodgkins–Countryside line	372.7	599.8	Historic US 66 (Joliet Road)	
Cook	La Grange	375.4	604.1	US 34 (Ogden Avenue)	
Cook	Westchester	378.7	609.5	IL 38 west (Roosevelt Road)	
Cook	Westchester	379.2	610.3	I-290 / IL 110 (CKC) (Dwight D. Eisenhower Expressway)	I-290 exit 17
Cook	Bellwood	379.9	611.4	IL 56 west (Washington Boulevard)	
Cook	Stone Park	381.0	613.2	US 20 west (Lake Street)	Northern end of US 20 concurrency
Cook	Stone Park	381.7	614.3	IL 64 (North Avenue)	Partial interchange
Cook	Franklin Park	383.5	617.2	Frontage Road	Interchange via connector roads
Cook	Schiller Park	385.2	619.9	IL 19 (Irving Park Road) to I-294 Toll north	
Cook	Schiller Park–Chicago line	386.1	621.4	Balmoral Avenue	South end of expressway
Cook	Chicago	387.0	622.8	I-190 (Kennedy Expressway) – Chicago, O'Hare	Parclo interchange; no direct access from I-190 EB; I-190 west exits 2A-B
Cook	Chicago	387.9	624.3	Economy Parking F, Rental Car Return	North end of expressway; no southbound exit
Cook	Chicago–Rosemont line	388.3	624.9	IL 72 (Higgins Road)	
Cook	Des Plaines	391.6	630.2	US 14 (Miner Street)	
Cook	Des Plaines	392.1	631.0	US 12 west (Rand Road)	Northern end of US 12 concurrency
Cook	Des Plaines	392.6	631.8	IL 58 (Golf Road)	
Cook	Prospect Heights	396.1	637.5	IL 21 south (Milwaukee Avenue south)	Southern end of IL 21 concurrency
Cook	Prospect Heights	396.4	637.9	Willow Road east to Illinois Tollway (I-294)	Diamond interchange
Cook	Prospect Heights	396.4	637.9	Palatine Road west – Chicago Executive Airport Viewing Area	Diamond interchange
Cook	Wheeling	398.8	641.8	IL 68 (Dundee Road)	
Cook–Lake county line	Wheeling–Buffalo Grove line	399.8	643.4	Lake Cook Road	Interchange
Lake	Vernon Hills	403.1	648.7	IL 22 (Half Day Road)	
Lake	Vernon Hills	403.4	649.2	IL 21 north (Milwaukee Avenue north)	Northern end of IL 21 concurrency
Lake	Mundelein	407.3	655.5	IL 83	
Lake	Mundelein	407.6	656.0	IL 60 (Townline Road)	
Lake	Mundelein	410.1	660.0	IL 176 (Maple Avenue)	
Lake	Libertyville	412.9	664.5	IL 137 (Buckley Road) – Volo, North Chicago	Interchange
Lake	Grayslake	414.6	667.2	IL 120 (Belvidere Road)	
Lake	Grandwood Park	418.1	672.9	IL 132 (Grand Avenue)	
Lake	Antioch	423.7	681.9	IL 173	
Lake		428.99	690.39	US 45 north – Milwaukee	Continuation into Wisconsin
1.000 mi = 1.609 km; 1.000 km = 0.621 mi: Concurrency terminus; Incomplete access

U.S. Route 45
Previous state: Kentucky	Illinois	Next state: Wisconsin
