= Dixon Springs =

Dixon Springs may refer to:

- Dixon Springs, Illinois
- Dixon Springs, Tennessee
- Dixon Springs State Park

== See also ==
- Dixon (disambiguation)
