= Illinois Route 146 =

State highway in southern Illinois, US

Illinois Route 146
- IL 146 highlighted in red

Route information
- Maintained by IDOT
- Length: 92.93 mi (149.56 km)
- Existed: 1926–present

Major junctions
- West end: Route 34 / Route 74 in East Cape Girardeau
- US 51 in Anna; I-57 in Anna; US 45 in Vienna; I-24 in Vienna
- East end: IL 1 in Loves Corner

Location
- Country: United States
- State: Illinois
- Counties: Alexander, Union, Johnson, Pope, Hardin

Highway system
- Illinois State Highway System; Interstate; US; State; Tollways; Scenic
← IL 145	→ IL 147

Illinois Route 146 (IL 146) is an east–west state highway in the U.S. state of Illinois. It serves the extreme southern region of the state, commonly called Little Egypt or the Illinois Ozarks. IL 146 is 92.93 miles (149.56 km) long. An east–west highway, it serves Hardin County, Pope County, Johnson County, Union County, and Alexander County. These are some of the least-populated counties in Illinois. IL 146 serves two sections of the Shawnee National Forest.

== Route description ==
IL 146 generally follows a land route of the Trail of Tears, a trail taken by bands of approximately 9,000 Cherokee who were forced to march through southern Illinois from November 1838 until January 1839 as part of a U.S. government mandated relocation. In 2006, the state of Illinois designated IL 146 as a historic highway and route of the Trail of Tears.

IL 146 intersects with two U.S. Interstate Highways: Interstate 24 at exit 16 near Vienna, and Interstate 57 at exit 30 near Anna.

IL 146 passes through an area of Illinois noted for scenic beauty and significant tourist visitation. State-operated parks and recreation areas on or adjacent to IL 146 include, from west to east:

- Union County State Fish and Wildlife Area near Jonesboro
- Trail of Tears State Forest near Jonesboro
- Cache River State Natural Area near Vienna
- Dixon Springs State Park near Dixon Springs
- Rauchfuss Hill State Recreation Area near Golconda
- Rose Hotel State Historic Site in Elizabethtown
- Cave-in-Rock State Park in Cave-in-Rock

The city of Jonesboro was the site of an open-air debate between Abraham Lincoln and Stephen Douglas in 1858. The site of the debate is preserved as a picnic area and park in Jonesboro.

== History ==
SBI Route 146 originally ran from East Cape Girardeau east to Golconda. In 1937 it was extended east to Elizabethtown, replacing a leg of Route 34. In 1942 the road was extended east to Cave-In-Rock. There have been no changes since 1942.

== Major intersections ==
County	Location	mi	km	Destinations	Notes
Mississippi River		0.0	0.0	Route 74 west – Cape Girardeau	Continuation into Missouri
Mississippi River		0.0	0.0	Bill Emerson Memorial Bridge; Missouri–Illinois state line	
Alexander	McClure	3.7	6.0	IL 3 south / Great River Road (National Route) south / Lincoln Heritage Trail (Southern Branch) – Cairo	Western end of IL 3 / Great River Road / Lincoln Heritage Trail overlap
Union	Ware	15.4	24.8	IL 3 north / Great River Road (National Route) north / Lincoln Heritage Trail (Southern Branch) – Wolf Lake, Chester, LaRue Pine Hills	Eastern end of IL 3 / Great River Road overlap
Union		20.8	33.5	IL 127 north – Murphysboro, Bald Knob	Western end of IL 127 overlap
Union	Jonesboro	23.0	37.0	Lincoln Heritage Trail (Southern Branch) (West Market Street) – Court House	Eastern end of Lincoln Heritage Trail overlap
Union	Jonesboro	23.3	37.5	IL 127 south – Cairo, Lincoln Memorial Park	Eastern end of IL 127 overlap; traffic circle around city park
Union	Anna	25.8	41.5	US 51 – Carbondale, Cairo	
Union		30.6	49.2	I-57 – Mount Vernon, Cairo	I-57 exit 30
Johnson	West Vienna	40.3	64.9	IL 37 – Marion, Cairo, Cache River Wetlands Center	
Johnson	Vienna	44.8	72.1	US 45 – Harrisburg, Metropolis	
Johnson	Vienna	46.0	74.0	I-24 – Interstate 57, Paducah	I-24 exit 16
Johnson		46.3	74.5	IL 147 east – Simpson	
Pope		57.4	92.4	IL 145 – Harrisburg, Paducah, KY	interchange
Hardin	Humm Wye	77.7	125.0	IL 34 north – Harrisburg	Western end of IL 34 overlap
Hardin		81.2	130.7	IL 34 south – Rosiclare	Eastern end of IL 34 overlap
Hardin	Loves Corner	92.93	149.56	IL 1 – Carmi, Cave in Rock	
1.000 mi = 1.609 km; 1.000 km = 0.621 mi: Concurrency terminus
