= Dixon =

Dixon may refer to:

== Places ==
=== International ===
- Dixon Entrance, part of the Inside Passage between Alaska and British Columbia

=== Canada ===
- Dixon, Ontario

=== United States ===
- Dixon, California
- Dixon, Illinois
- Dixon, Indiana and Ohio, an unincorporated community in Allen County, Indiana and Van Wert County, Ohio
- Dixon, Iowa
- Dixon, Kentucky
- Dixon, New Orleans
- Dixon, Michigan
- Dixon, Missouri
- Dixon, Nebraska
- Dixon, New Mexico
- Dixon, South Dakota
- Dixon, Wyoming
- Dixon County, Nebraska
- Dixon Lane-Meadow Creek, California
- Sčilíp, Montana, Previously named Dixon

=== Other ===
- Dixons Creek, Victoria, Australia

== Other uses ==
- Dixon (surname)
- Dixon (DJ) (born 1975), German house and techno DJ and producer
- Dixon, drummer in an early line-up of Siouxsie and the Banshees
- Dixon of Dock Green, BBC TV police series
- Dixon Ticonderoga, a pencil manufacturer
- Dixon (Shacklefords, Virginia)
- USS Dixon, a U.S. Navy submarine tender
- Dixon Technologies, Indian multinational electronics manufacturing services company

== See also ==
- Dickson (disambiguation)
- Dikson (disambiguation)
- Dixon Springs (disambiguation)
- Dixon Township (disambiguation)
- Dixons (disambiguation)
- Justice Dixon (disambiguation)
