= New Liberty, Illinois =

- Unincorporated community
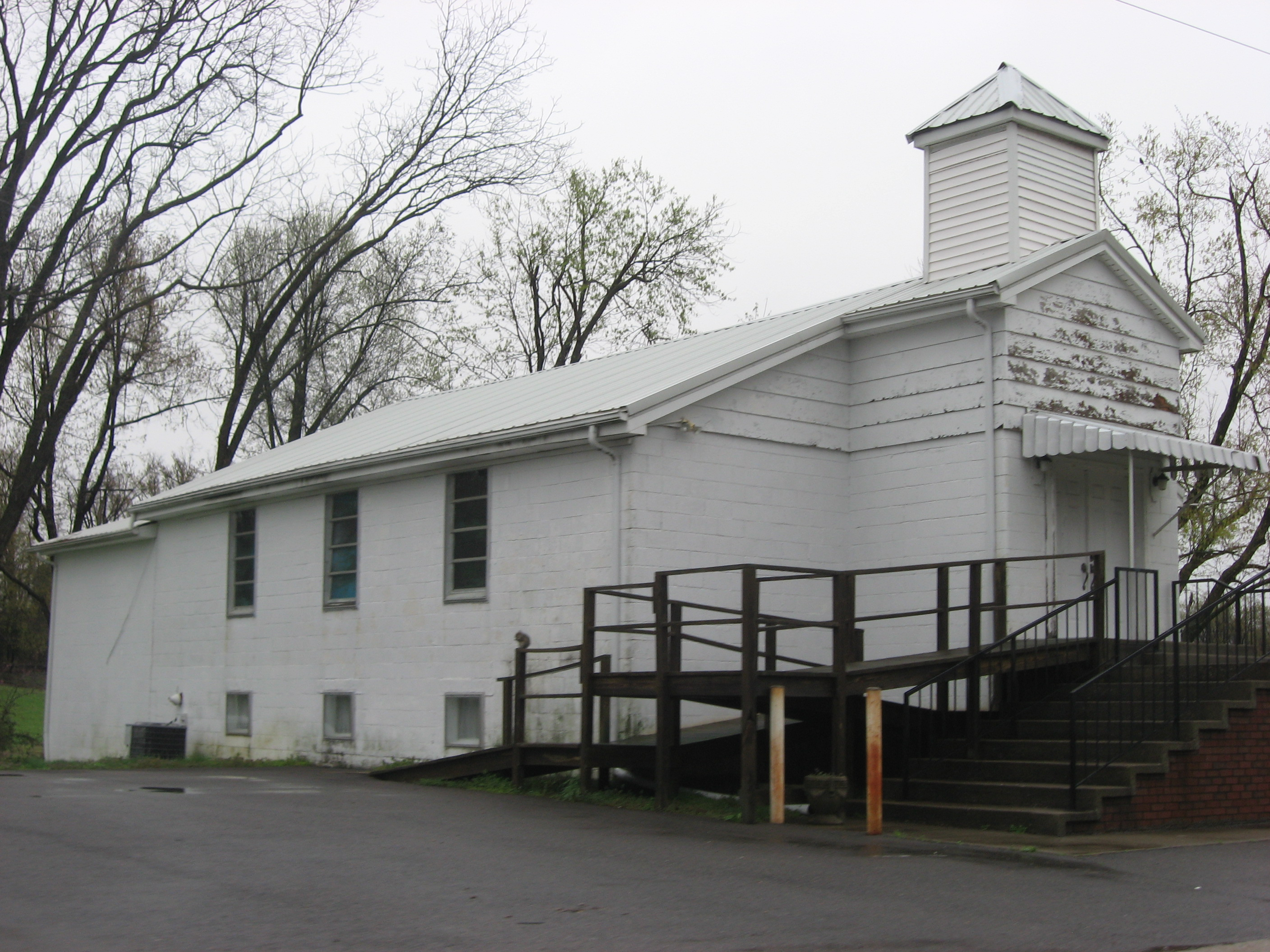
- Calvary Missionary Baptist Church

- Location within Illinois Location within the United States
- Coordinates: 37°07′19″N 88°26′52″W
- Country: United States
- State: Illinois
- County: Pope
- Elevation: 335 ft (102 m)
- Time zone: UTC-6 (Central (CST))
  - Summer (DST): UTC-5 (CDT)
- Area code: 618
- GNIS feature ID: 414440

New Liberty is an unincorporated community in Pope County, Illinois, United States. New Liberty is 10 miles (16 km) east of Brookport.

A post office named New Liberty operated from 1848 to 1974.
