= Simpson, Illinois =

- Village
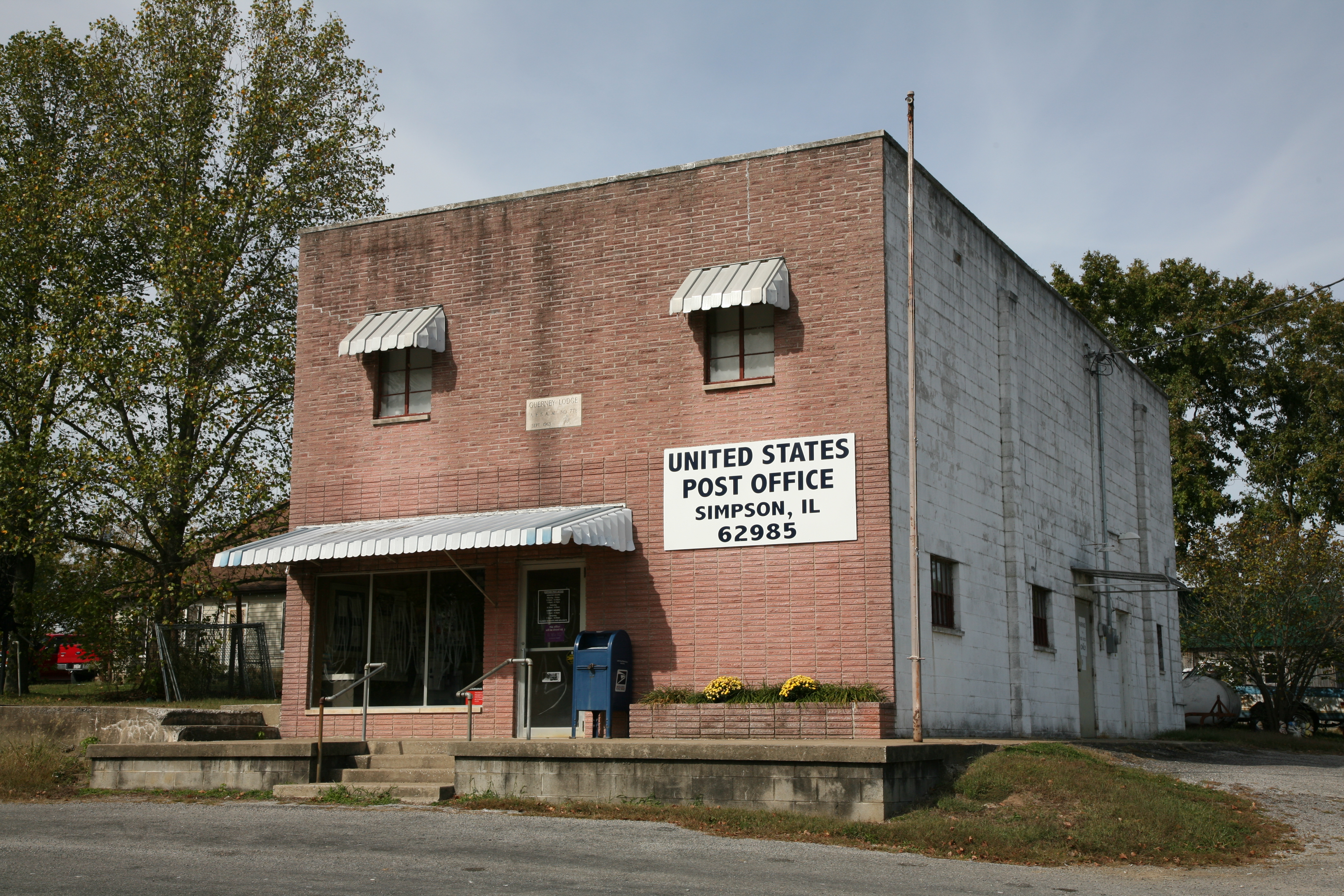
- Simpson post office on Main Street

- Location of Simpson in Johnson County, Illinois
- Coordinates: 37°28′02″N 88°45′12″W
- Country: United States
- State: Illinois
- County: Johnson

Area
  - Total: 0.53 sq mi (1.36 km^{2})
  - Land: 0.53 sq mi (1.36 km^{2})
  - Water: 0 sq mi (0.00 km^{2})
- Elevation: 384 ft (117 m)

Population (2020)
  - Total: 44
  - Density: 83.8/sq mi (32.34/km^{2})
- Time zone: UTC-6 (CST)
  - Summer (DST): UTC-5 (CDT)
- ZIP code: 62985
- Area code: 618
- FIPS code: 17-70005
- GNIS feature ID: 2399824

Simpson is a village in Johnson County, Illinois, United States. As of the 2020 census, Simpson had a population of 44.

== Geography ==
Simpson is located in eastern Johnson County in the valley of Cedar Creek, a south-flowing tributary of Bay Creek and part of the Ohio River watershed. Illinois Route 147 passes through the village, leading southwest 9 miles (14 km) to Vienna, the county seat, and east 5 miles (8 km) to its terminus at Glendale.

According to the 2021 census gazetteer files, Simpson has a total area of 0.53 square miles (1.37 km^{2}), of which 0.53 square miles (1.37 km^{2}) (or 99.81%) is land and 0.00 square miles (0.00 km^{2}) (or 0.19%) is water.

== Demographics ==
Historical population
Census	Pop.	Note	%±
1900	187		—
1910	161		−13.9%
1920	178		10.6%
1930	144		−19.1%
1940	172		19.4%
1950	119		−30.8%
1960	89		−25.2%
1970	82		−7.9%
1980	67		−18.3%
1990	61		−9.0%
2000	54		−11.5%
2010	60		11.1%
2020	44		−26.7%
U.S. Decennial Census

As of the 2020 census there were 44 people, 17 households, and 14 families residing in the village. The population density was 83.65 inhabitants per square mile (32.30/km^{2}). There were 27 housing units at an average density of 51.33 per square mile (19.82/km^{2}). The racial makeup of the village was 97.73% White, 0.00% African American, 0.00% Native American, 0.00% Asian, 0.00% Pacific Islander, 2.27% from other races, and 0.00% from two or more races. Hispanic or Latino of any race were 2.27% of the population.

There were 17 households, out of which 47.1% had children under the age of 18 living with them, 70.59% were married couples living together, 11.76% had a female householder with no husband present, and 17.65% were non-families. 11.76% of all households were made up of individuals, and 0.00% had someone living alone who was 65 years of age or older. The average household size was 4.64 and the average family size was 4.06.

The village's age distribution consisted of 34.8% under the age of 18, 2.9% from 18 to 24, 34.7% from 25 to 44, 26% from 45 to 64, and 1.4% who were 65 years of age or older. The median age was 30.9 years. For every 100 females, there were 91.7 males. For every 100 females age 18 and over, there were 80.0 males.

The median income for a household in the village was $49,375, and the median income for a family was $51,250. Males had a median income of $16,719 versus $23,571 for females. The per capita income for the village was $19,136. None of the population was below the poverty line.
