= Dixons =

Dixons may refer to:

- Currys plc - the current parent company of numerous European retailers of electronic goods, formerly known as Dixons Carphone
  - Dixons Retail - former parent company, before its merger with Carphone Warehouse
  - Dixons (retailer), former British electronic goods retailer
  - Dixons Travel, a current spin-off of the former brand, exclusive to airports
- Dixons (Netherlands), a Dutch electricals retailer, originally part of the British Dixons, now independent
- Dixon's factorization method, an application of the square factoring method
- Dixons Lake, Nova Scotia, Canada
- J F Dixons, former department store, Southend-on-Sea, England

== See also ==
- Dixon (disambiguation)
- Dickson (disambiguation)
