= Vienna, Illinois =

- City
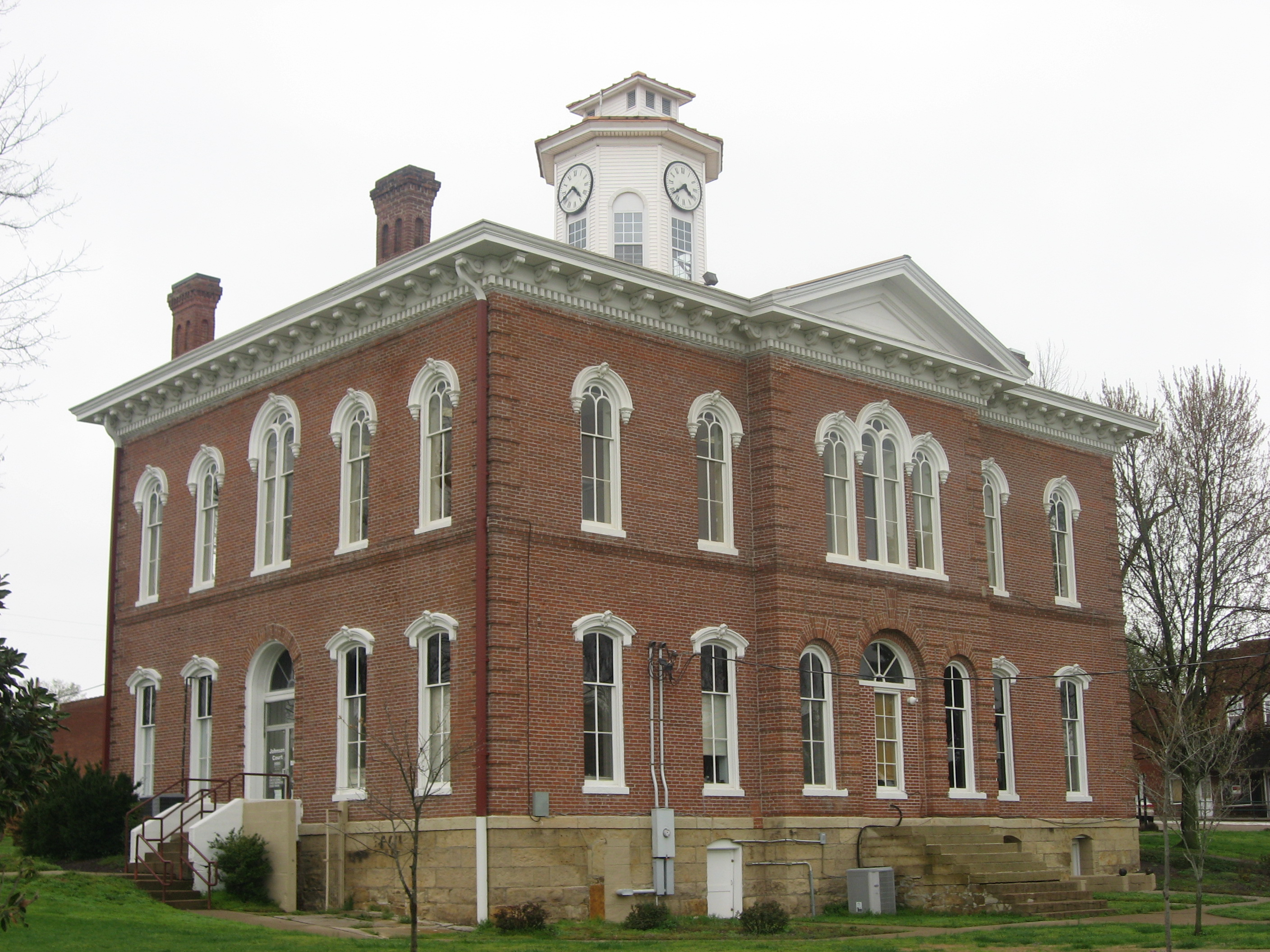
- Johnson County Courthouse
- Interactive map of Vienna, Illinois
- Location within Illinois Location within the United States
- Coordinates: 37°24′47″N 88°52′32″W
- Country: United States
- State: Illinois
- County: Johnson

Area
  - Total: 2.87 sq mi (7.44 km^{2})
  - Land: 2.84 sq mi (7.35 km^{2})
  - Water: 0.039 sq mi (0.10 km^{2})
- Elevation: 367 ft (112 m)

Population (2020)
  - Total: 1,343
  - Density: 473/sq mi (182.8/km^{2})
- Time zone: UTC-6 (CST)
  - Summer (DST): UTC-5 (CDT)
- ZIP code: 62995
- Area codes: 618/730
- FIPS code: 17-77863
- GNIS feature ID: 2397137
- Website: cityofviennail.net

Vienna (/vaɪˈænə/ vy-AN-ə) is a city in and the county seat of Johnson County, Illinois, United States. The population of Vienna was 1,343 at the 2020 census.

== History ==
Vienna was originally an Indian trading post in the early 1800s, the forming of Vienna far preceded the rise of the railroad and coal industries in the region, but it was not named after Austria's capital. Platted as early as 1818 - the same year Illinois became a state - and named the county seat, Vienna was incorporated as a village in 1837 and then as a city in 1893. It has served as the county seat for close to 200 years. In fact, the first post office opened in 1821 before the town was ever incorporated. Vienna is also one of the settlements tens of thousands of Native Americans were forced to pass through in 1830 en route to Oklahoma where they were relocated by the U.S. government. That forced migration westward came to be known as the Trail of Tears due to the brutal conditions that the Native Americans faced. Having to walk barefoot in the middle of winter, thousands died by order of the U.S. government. The Johnson County Courthouse was built in 1868 and is one of the oldest active courthouses in the state. Total cost of the project 140 years ago was a little more than $80,000 (approximately $1.5 million in 2021).

== Geography ==
According to the 2010 census, Vienna has a total area of 2.887 square miles (7.48 km^{2}), of which 2.85 square miles (7.38 km^{2}) (or 98.72%) is land and 0.037 square miles (0.10 km^{2}) (or 1.28%) is water.

=== Notable locations ===
Vienna Correctional Center—6695 State Route 146 E., Vienna, IL 62995—was opened in November 1965. Vienna is a minimum-security prison. The operational capacity is 1,963. This is an adult male facility only. The Average Annual Cost Per Inmate is $21,310 (FY16).

Heron Pond - Little Black Slough Nature Preserve, a National Natural Landmark, is nearby.

The Tunnel Hill State Trail trail-head and headquarters is located in Vienna.

The Trail of Tears halfway point commemorative totem and flags are located in the adjacent city park.

Vienna is home to the Johnson County Courthouse and the Vienna Public Library, which are on the National Register of Historic Places.

Dixon Springs State Park is located nearby in Dixon Springs, which offers a public pool and picnic areas.

The Garden of the Gods Wilderness is located a short distance east of Vienna, offering hikers a place to hike locally.

== Demographics ==
Historical population
Census	Pop.	Note	%±
1850	142		—
1870	550		—
1880	494		−10.2%
1890	828		67.6%
1900	1,217		47.0%
1910	1,124		−7.6%
1920	907		−19.3%
1930	874		−3.6%
1940	1,173		34.2%
1950	1,085		−7.5%
1960	1,094		0.8%
1970	1,325		21.1%
1980	1,420		7.2%
1990	1,446		1.8%
2000	1,234		−14.7%
2010	1,434		16.2%
2020	1,343		−6.3%
U.S. Decennial Census

=== 2020 census ===
As of the 2020 census, Vienna had a population of 1,343. There were 370 families residing in the city. The population density was 467.29 inhabitants per square mile (180.42/km^{2}). There were 707 housing units at an average density of 246.00 per square mile (94.98/km^{2}).

The median age was 43.7 years. 22.5% of residents were under the age of 18 and 26.5% of residents were 65 years of age or older. For every 100 females there were 80.0 males, and for every 100 females age 18 and over there were 72.6 males age 18 and over.

0.0% of residents lived in urban areas, while 100.0% lived in rural areas.

There were 625 households in Vienna, of which 25.9% had children under the age of 18 living in them. Of all households, 32.3% were married-couple households, 17.9% were households with a male householder and no spouse or partner present, and 43.8% were households with a female householder and no spouse or partner present. About 44.3% of all households were made up of individuals and 25.7% had someone living alone who was 65 years of age or older.

There were 707 housing units, of which 11.6% were vacant. The homeowner vacancy rate was 2.4% and the rental vacancy rate was 8.2%.

Racial composition as of the 2020 census
Race	Number	Percent
White	1,230	91.6%
Black or African American	18	1.3%
American Indian and Alaska Native	3	0.2%
Asian	1	0.1%
Native Hawaiian and Other Pacific Islander	1	0.1%
Some other race	28	2.1%
Two or more races	62	4.6%
Hispanic or Latino (of any race)	48	3.6%

=== Income and poverty ===
The median income for a household in the city was $30,809, and the median income for a family was $55,234. Males had a median income of $36,103 versus $21,484 for females. The per capita income for the city was $22,554. About 15.9% of families and 24.0% of the population were below the poverty line, including 41.6% of those under age 18 and 9.5% of those age 65 or over.

== Education ==
The city, which has about 700 students within its two districts, is home to Vienna Grade School and Vienna High School. Located nearby are Shawnee Community College in Ullin and Southern Illinois University Carbondale in Carbondale.

== Transportation ==
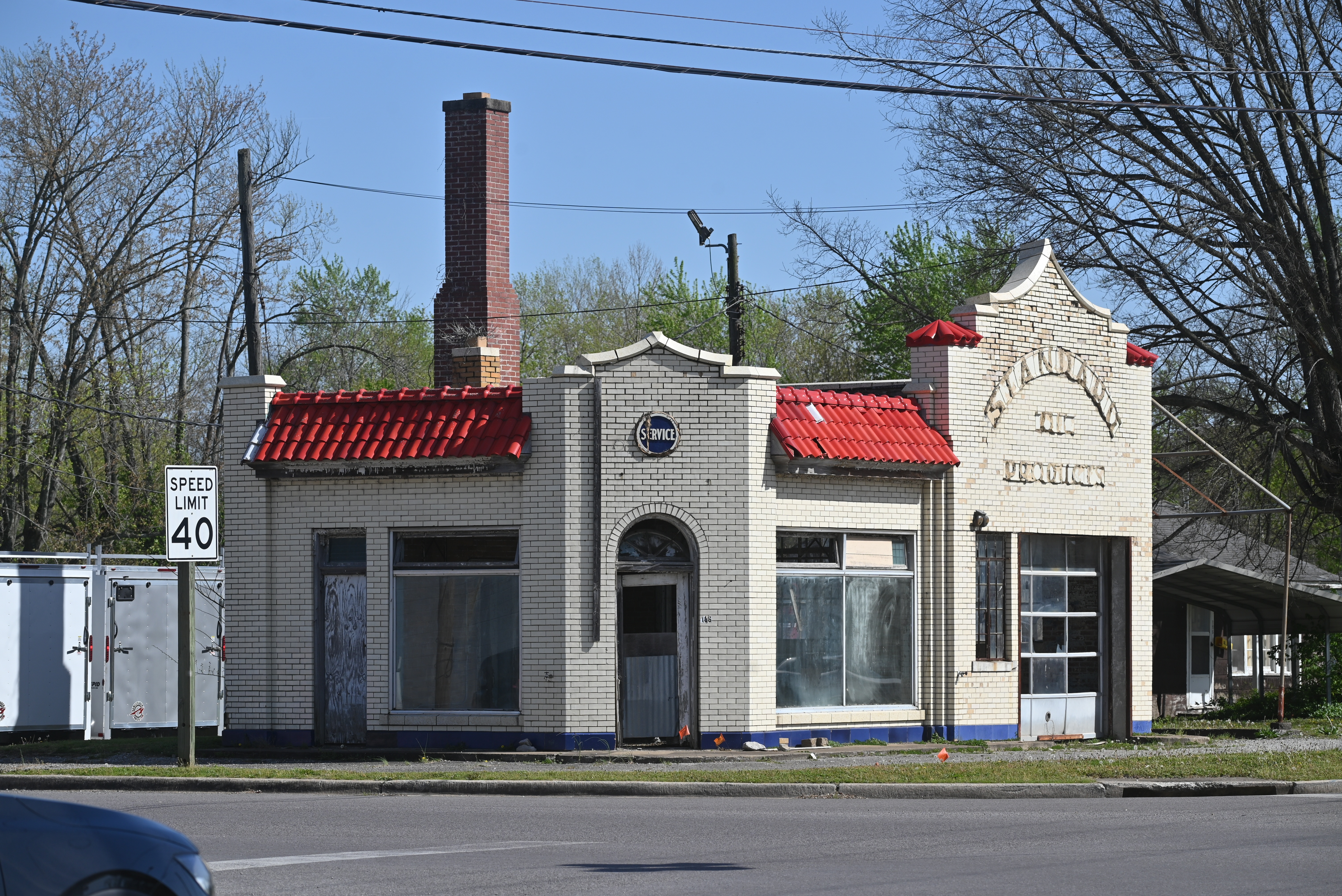
Historic gas station at the intersection of US 45 and Illinois 146

Greyhound Bus service to Vienna formerly ran daily, but this direct service is no longer available as of late 2025.

=== Major highways ===
- I-24
- US 45
- Illinois Route 146 crosses with U.S. 45 and IL 37.
- Illinois Route 147
- Illinois Route 37

=== Cycling ===
Vienna is known for its regular cycling events and proximity to Tunnel Hill State Trail, which spans from Eldorado to Karnak. An additional path that runs from Vienna High School to Vienna Trail of Tears City Park was completed in August 2014, directly connecting Northern Vienna and the Tunnel Hill State Trail.

U.S. Bicycle Route 76 crosses with Tunnel Hill State Trail in Vienna.

The state trail's headquarters is in Vienna, and a small museum is located onsite.

== Notable people ==
- Levi Casey, triple jumper
- Pleasant T. Chapman, Congressman, born nearby and practiced law here
- George W. English, U.S. District Court judge, born nearby, practiced law here, was impeached in 1926
- William Heirens, reputed serial-killer, spent 23 years at Vienna Correctional Center
- Andrew J. Kuykendall, Congressman, practiced law here
- Adrian Lindsey, college football coach
- C. L. McCormick, Illinois legislator, lived here
- William W. Mitchell Sr., Arizona legislator, born here
- Paul Powell, former Illinois Secretary of State, born here
