= Allen Springs =

Allen Springs may refer to:

- Allen Springs, California, a group of mineral water springs in Lake County, California
- Allen Springs, Kentucky, a rural unincorporated community in northwest Allen County, Kentucky
- Allens Spring, Illinois, an unincorporated community in Pope County, Illinois
