= Rising Sun, Illinois =

Rising Sun, Illinois may refer to:

- Rising Sun, Pope County, Illinois, an unincorporated community in Pope County
- Rising Sun, White County, Illinois, an unincorporated community in White County
