= Illinois Route 147 =

State highway in southern Illinois, US

Illinois Route 147
- IL 147 highlighted in red

Route information
- Maintained by IDOT
- Length: 12.81 mi (20.62 km)
- Existed: 1947–present

Major junctions
- West end: IL 146 in Vienna
- East end: IL 145 in Eddyville

Location
- Country: United States
- State: Illinois
- Counties: Johnson, Pope

Highway system
- Illinois State Highway System; Interstate; US; State; Tollways; Scenic
← IL 146	→ IL 148

Illinois Route 147 is an east–west state road in southern Illinois. It runs from Illinois Route 146 east of Vienna (very near an interchange with Interstate 24) to Illinois Route 145 in Glendale. This is a distance of 12.81 miles (20.62 km).

== Route description ==
Illinois 147 is a two-lane surface road for its entire length. It runs through central portions of Shawnee National Forest. Illinois 147 also serves Simpson.

== History ==
SBI Route 147 was originally the road from Marion to Cairo. The stretch from Mounds to Marion was designated as part of the Egyptian Highway in February 1933. In 1942, this road became Illinois Route 37. Illinois 147 then replaced what was Illinois Route 142A from McLeansboro to Wayne City. In 1947, Illinois 142A became Illinois Route 142; Illinois 147 was again moved to its current Vienna-to-Glendale routing.

IL 147 east of Vienna is commonly referred to by locals as "The Simpson Blacktop".

== Major Intersections ==
County	Location	mi	km	Destinations	Notes
Johnson		0.00	0.00	IL 146	
Pope		12.81	20.62	IL 145	
1.000 mi = 1.609 km; 1.000 km = 0.621 mi
