= Homberg, Illinois =

- Unincorporated community
- Location within Illinois Location within the United States
- Coordinates: 37°19′31″N 88°33′07″W
- Country: United States
- State: Illinois
- County: Pope
- Elevation: 364 ft (111 m)
- Time zone: UTC-6 (Central (CST))
  - Summer (DST): UTC-5 (CDT)
- Area code: 618
- GNIS feature ID: 425007

Homberg is an unincorporated community in Pope County, Illinois, United States, near the Ohio River and about five miles (8 km) southwest of the county seat of Golconda. It is on a flat riverbed, a former channel of the Ohio River when the river turned west and flowed a bit south of the present Illinois Route 146, crossing the current Mississippi River south of Cape Girardeau, Missouri, eventually merging with the Mississippi of that time, near Memphis, Tennessee. Earthquakes of 10,000 years ago may have helped change the channels of the rivers.

A rail line, used to transport feldspar mined near Rosiclare, ran through Homberg. The rail line, abandoned as mining died down, was officially removed in 1982. A small foodstore which doubled as a post office, continued to operate until the 1970s. The bluff along the north side of the old river bed is 240 feet high.
