= Humm Wye, Illinois =

- Unincorporated community
- Location within Illinois Location within the United States
- Coordinates: 37°27′38″N 88°24′22″W
- Country: United States
- State: Illinois
- County: Hardin
- Elevation: 443 ft (135 m)
- Time zone: UTC-6 (Central (CST))
  - Summer (DST): UTC-5 (CDT)
- Area code: 618
- ISO 3166 code: USA
- GNIS feature ID: 425021

Humm Wye is an unincorporated community in Hardin County, Illinois, United States. Humm Wye is located at the intersection of Illinois Route 34 and Illinois Route 146, west of Elizabethtown.
