= Brownfield, Illinois =

- Unincorporated community
- Location within Illinois Location within the United States
- Coordinates: 37°20′44″N 88°36′25″W
- Country: United States
- State: Illinois
- County: Pope
- Elevation: 348 ft (106 m)
- Time zone: UTC-6 (Central (CST))
  - Summer (DST): UTC-5 (CDT)
- Area code: 618
- GNIS feature ID: 424678

Brownfield is an unincorporated community in Pope County, Illinois, United States. Brownfield is 7 miles (11 km) west-southwest of Golconda.

Brownfield was originally named New Brownfield with a post office of that name opening in 1903 shortly after the construction of the railroad at the locale. The original Brownfield post office about 1 mile to the northeast closed in 1906 (since marked on maps as Old Brownfield), and the New Brownfield post office name was shortened to Brownfield in 1911. The Brownfield post office closed on July 27, 1991.
