= Hamletsburg, Illinois =

- unincorporated community
- Location within Illinois Location within the United States
- Coordinates: 37°14′30″N 88°43′20″W
- Country: United States
- State: Illinois
- County: Pope County
- Elevation: 358 ft (109 m)
- Time zone: Central Standard Time (North America)
- ZIP code: 62910
- GNIS feature ID: 409706

Hamletsburg, Illinois is an unincorporated community in Pope County, Illinois, United States.

== History ==
Hamletsburg was named for Hamlet Ferguson, an early settler (1814) and the first Pope county sheriff. Previously an incorporated village, it was disincorporated in 1998.

A post office named Hamletsburg opened in 1885.
