= Dickson (given name) =

- Gender: Male
- Language: English

Origin
- Region of origin: British Empire

Other names
- Short form: Dick

Dickson is a male given name mainly found in countries of the former British Empire.

== Notable people who bears the name ==
- Dickson Agyeman (born 1985), Belgian football midfielder
- Dickson Choto (born 1981), Zimbabwean football defender playing in Poland
- Dickson Chumba (born 1986), Kenyan long-distance runner
- Dickson Despommier (1940–2025), American academic, microbiologist and ecologist
- Dickson Etuhu (born 1982), Nigerian football defensive midfielder playing in England
- Dickson Iroegbu, Nigerian film director and producer
- Dickson Mabon (1925–2008), Scottish politician and former minister for the Labour Party
- Dickson Makwaza (born 1942), Zambian football coach and international defender
- Dickson Marwa (born 1982), Tanzanian long-distance runner
- Dickson Matorwa (born 1975), Zimbabwean sculptor
- Dickson Mua (born 1972), Solomon Islands politician and government minister
- Dickson Nwakaeme (born 1986), Nigerian football forward
- Dickson Poon (born 1956), Hong Kong businessman and founder of Dickson Concepts
- Dickson Wamwiri (1984–2020), Kenyan taekwondo practitioner.

=== It may also refer to ===
- Dickson (surname)
- Dickson (disambiguation)
- Dixon (surname)
