= Loves Corner, Illinois =

- Unincorporated community
- Location within Illinois Location within the United States
- Coordinates: 37°29′44″N 88°10′14″W
- Country: United States
- State: Illinois
- County: Hardin
- Elevation: 469 ft (143 m)
- Time zone: UTC-6 (Central (CST))
  - Summer (DST): UTC-5 (CDT)
- Area code: 618
- GNIS feature ID: 425146

Loves Corner is an unincorporated community in Hardin County, Illinois, United States. Loves Corner is located at the intersection of Illinois Route 1 and Illinois Route 146, north of Cave-In-Rock.
