= Vienna High School =

Coordinates: 37.4206°N 88.8945°W

Location
- 601 North First Street, Vienna, IL; Johnson County 62995

Information
- School type: Public secondary
- School district: Vienna HSD 133
- Superintendent: Joshua W. Stafford
- Dean: Kathy L. Anderson (Dean of Instruction)
- Principal: John R. Giffin
- Staff: 25.41 (FTE)
- Grades: 9-12
- Enrollment: 324 (2023–2024)
- Student to teacher ratio: 12.75
- Campus type: Distant Rural
- Colour
- Mascot: Eagle
- Rival: Goreville High School
- Newspaper: The Talon
- Yearbook: The Illianna
- Feeder schools: -Buncombe Grade School -Cypress Grade School -New Simpson Hill Grade School -Vienna Grade School
- Website: http://www.viennahighschool.com/

Vienna High School (VHS) is a public four-year high school located in Vienna, Illinois. VHS serves approximately 356 students in Vienna HSD 133, which covers 300 square miles in Johnson County. Feeder schools include Buncombe, Cypress, New Simpson Hill, and Vienna grade schools.

== History ==
VHS was founded in the 19th century and had its first graduating class in 1895.

In 2016, the Illinois Clean Energy Community Foundation and the USDA partnered with VHS to install free solar panels at the school for students to get hands-on training and certification to install solar panels.

== Athletics ==
David Hill serves as the Athletic Director.

=== Baseball ===
David Hill serves as the baseball coach at Vienna High school and has served in the role since 2003-04 season. His career record following the 2018-2019 season stands at 235-227 with 2 Regional Championships to his credit. All-time, the program is 1192-749 dating back to 1952 with 9 Regional Titles, 1 Sectional, and 1 State Finals appearance in 1978.

== Notable alumni ==
- Bob Shoemaker, Illinois Coaches Association Softball Hall of Fame Inductee 2010.
