= Johnson County Courthouse (Illinois) =

Local government building in the United States

- U.S. National Register of Historic Places
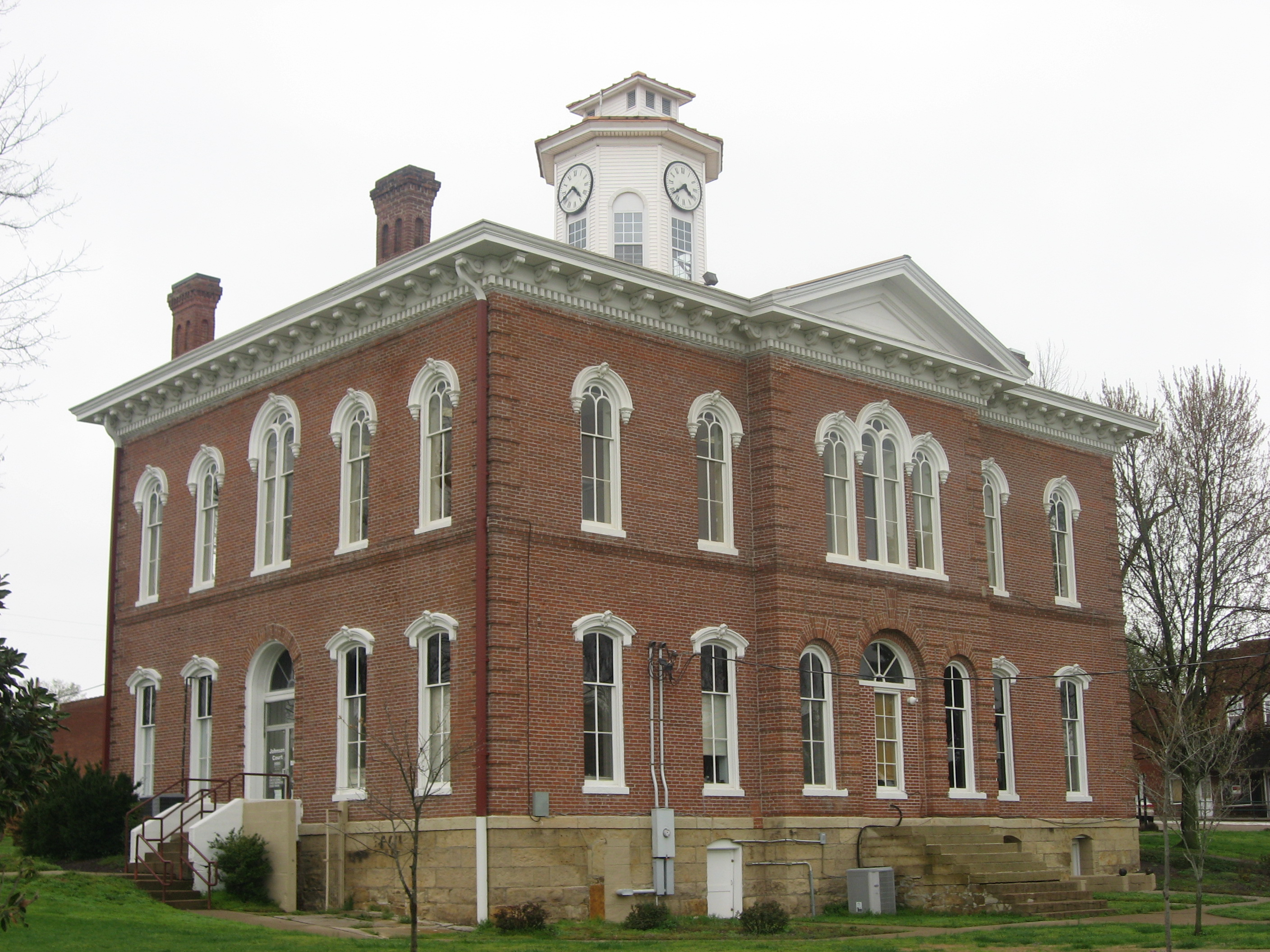

- Location within Illinois Location within the United States
- Interactive map showing the location of Johnson County Courthouse
- Location: Courthouse Square, Vienna, Illinois
- Coordinates: 37°24′52″N 88°53′48″W
- Built: 1869-1871
- Architect: Niles Llewelly Wickwire
- Architectural style: Italianate
- NRHP reference No.: 10000725
- Added to NRHP: September 9, 2010

The Johnson County Courthouse, located at Courthouse Square in Vienna, is the county courthouse serving Johnson County, Illinois. The courthouse was built from 1869 to 1871; as county records are unclear on the matter, the courthouse was either the fourth or fifth built in the county and the second or third in Vienna. Architect Niles Llewelly Wickwire designed the courthouse in the Italianate style. The courthouse's design features narrow arched windows with iron hoods, brick quoins on the corners, triangular pediments above the east and west entrances, and a bracketed cornice. The roof is topped by an octagonal cupola with a clock facing each side of the building. The courthouse has functioned continuously since its opening.

The courthouse was added to the National Register of Historic Places on September 9, 2010.
