= Illinois Route 34 =

State highway in southern Illinois, US

Illinois Route 34
- IL 34 highlighted in red

Route information
- Maintained by IDOT
- Length: 61.74 mi (99.36 km)
- Existed: November 5, 1918–present

Major junctions
- South end: Hopkinton and Walnut Streets in Rosiclare
- US 45 / IL 13 / IL 145 in Harrisburg
- North end: IL 14 / IL 37 in Benton

Location
- Country: United States
- State: Illinois
- Counties: Hardin, Pope, Saline, Franklin

Highway system
- Illinois State Highway System; Interstate; US; State; Tollways; Scenic
← US 34	→ IL 35

Illinois Route 34 (IL 34) is a north–south state road in southern Illinois. It runs from a former ferry crossing to Kentucky Route 297 across the Ohio River in Rosiclare to Illinois Routes 14/37 in Benton. This is a distance of 61.74 miles (99.36 km).

== Route description ==
Illinois 34 overlaps Illinois Route 146 and Illinois Route 145 between Rosiclare and Harrisburg. In Harrisburg, Illinois 34 formerly ran the length of Main Street where it at one time sharply turned at Raymond St, then crossed a five way stop between U.S. Route 45, Sloan St, and Illinois Route 145 where it overlapped.

Congestion in this area was greatly reduced when the concurrent highway was re-routed farther south to connect and is now concurrent with U.S. Route 45, which it follows to the Bill Franks Bypass (Illinois Route 13). Route 34 then travels west with Route 13 to Main Street, where it then departs Harrisburg heading north.

Illinois Route 34 serves as a main north–south road for towns located in the eastern portion of the Shawnee National Forest.

== History ==
SBI Route 37 ran from Harrisburg to Elizabethtown, currently located northeast of Rosiclare on Illinois 146. There was also a spur west to Golconda, which is located southwest of Rosiclare on modern-day Illinois 146. In 1937, the road was extended northwest to Benton and its southern end moved to the Rosiclare ferry, which stopped operating in the mid 1960s.

== Major intersections ==
County	Location	mi	km	Destinations	Notes
Hardin	Rosiclare	0.0	0.0	CR 1 south (Main Street) / Hopkinton Street / Walnut Street	Southern terminus; road continues as CR 1 (Main Street)
Hardin	Elizabethtown	2.2	3.5	IL 146 east	South end of IL 146 overlap
Hardin	Humm Wye	5.6	9.0	IL 146 west	North end of IL 146 overlap
Pope	No major junctions				
Saline	Harrisburg	22.5	36.2	IL 145 south	South end of IL 145 overlap
Saline	Harrisburg	28.4	45.7	US 45 south (Commercial Street south) / IL 145 end	South end of US 45 overlap; north end of IL 145 overlap; northern terminus of IL 145
Saline	Harrisburg	29.6	47.6	US 45 north (Commercial Street north) / IL 13 east (Harrisburg Bypass east)	South end of IL 13 overlap; north end of US 45 overlap
Saline	Harrisburg	30.2	48.6	IL 13 west (Harrisburg Bypass west)	North end of IL 13 overlap
Franklin	Thompsonville	51.6	83.0	IL 149 west	
Franklin	Benton	61.74	99.36	IL 14 / IL 37 (Public Square) to I-57	Roundabout; northern terminus
1.000 mi = 1.609 km; 1.000 km = 0.621 mi: Concurrency terminus
