= Allens Spring, Illinois =

- Unincorporated community
- Location within Illinois Location within the United States
- Coordinates: 37°22′08″N 88°39′25″W
- Country: United States
- State: Illinois
- County: Pope
- Elevation: 486 ft (148 m)
- Time zone: UTC-6 (Central (CST))
  - Summer (DST): UTC-5 (CDT)
- Area code: 618
- GNIS feature ID: 422399

Allens Spring is an unincorporated community in Pope County, in the U.S. state of Illinois.

== History ==
A post office was established at Allen Spring in 1857, and remained in operation until 1928. George M. Allen, an early postmaster, gave the community his name.
