= Gladys Dickason =

American economist

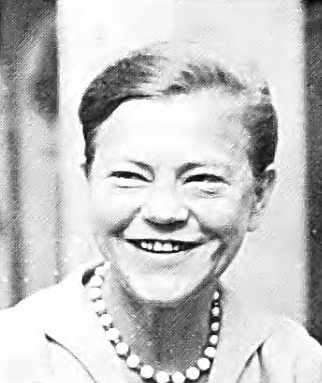
- Dickason c. 1960
- Born: January 28, 1903; Galena, Oklahoma
- Died: August 31, 1971 (aged 68); New York, New York

Academic background
- Education: Columbia University; University of Oklahoma

Academic work
- Discipline: Labor economics
- Institutions: Sweet Briar College; Hunter College

Gladys Marie Dickason (1903–1971) was an American labor economist. She was a research director with the Amalgamated Clothing Workers of America. She earned degrees from the University of Oklahoma and Columbia University. She fought for minimum-wage standards in the 1938 Fair Labor Standards Act and campaigned against Cluett Peabody & Company.

== Early life and education ==
Gladys Marie Dickason was born on January 28, 1903, in Galena, Oklahoma, to Linnie (née Kellerman) and Simon Milton Dickason. Her family moved to Okemeh, Indian Territory in 1904, and were cotton farmers there.

Dickason attended the University of Oklahoma, earning her AB in 1922. She then attended Columbia University, earning an AM in economics and political science in 1924. She was a teacher in New York at the Hamilton Grange School. She also attended London School of Economics briefly.

== Career ==
Dickason moved to Virginia where she taught economics at Sweet Briar College. In the 1920s and 1930s, she taught at Hunter College as part of the political science department. She befriended Jacob Potofsky of the Amalgamated Clothing Workers of America (ACWA). From 1933 to 1934, Dickason worked with the Cotton Garment Code Authority of the National Recovery Administration. Beginning in 1936, she was a research director at ACWA.

She was appointed a special representative of the cotton garment workers. In 1937, she campaigned against Cluett Peabody & Company, finally winning in 1941. Dickason fought for minimum-wage standards in the 1938 Fair Labor Standards Act. In 1951 she spent time in Japan, training women as union organizers. She was honored by the National Council of Negro Women in 1951, for her contributions to the "social and cultural development of mankind". She worked with the ACWA until 1954.

Dickason retired in 1963, and died on August 31, 1971, at age 68, in New York City.

== Publications ==
- "Notes from Oklahoma" (1921)
- "Women in Labor Unions" (1947)
- "Gains and Goals of Women Workers" (1948)
