= Justice Dixon =

Justice Dixon may refer to:

- Jane Dixon (judge) (fl. 1980s–2020s), judge of the Supreme Court of Victoria
- John Dixon (judge) (fl. 1970s–2020s), judge of the Supreme Court of Victoria
- Jonathan Dixon (judge) (1839–1906), associate justice of the New Jersey Supreme Court
- John Allen Dixon Jr. (1920–2003), associate justice of the Louisiana Supreme Court
- Luther S. Dixon (1825–1891), chief justice of the Wisconsin Supreme Court
- Sir Owen Dixon (1886–1972), sixth chief justice of Australia
- William C. Dixon (1904–1997), associate justice of the Ohio Supreme Court

== See also ==
- Brian Dickson (1916–1998), Canadian judge, and Chief Justice of Canada 1984–1990
