= Dikson =

Dikson may refer to

- Dikson Island, a Russian island in the Kara Sea
- Dikson (urban-type settlement), a port urban-type settlement in Krasnoyarsk Krai, Russia
- Dikson Airport, airport in the urban-type settlement of Dikson
- Dikson (icebreaker), a Russian icebreaker

== See also ==
- Dixon (disambiguation)
- Dickson (disambiguation)
- Dickson (surname)
