= Rising Sun, Pope County, Illinois =

Rising Sun, Illinois
- Unincorporated community
- Location within Illinois Location within the United States
- Coordinates: 37°24′25″N 88°34′41″W
- Country: United States
- State: Illinois
- County: Pope
- Elevation: 640 ft (200 m)
- Time zone: UTC-6 (Central (CST))
  - Summer (DST): UTC-5 (CDT)
- Area code: 618
- GNIS feature ID: 425385

Rising Sun is an unincorporated community in Pope County, Illinois, United States. Rising Sun is 6 miles (9.7 km) northwest of Golconda.
