= Brookport Bridge =

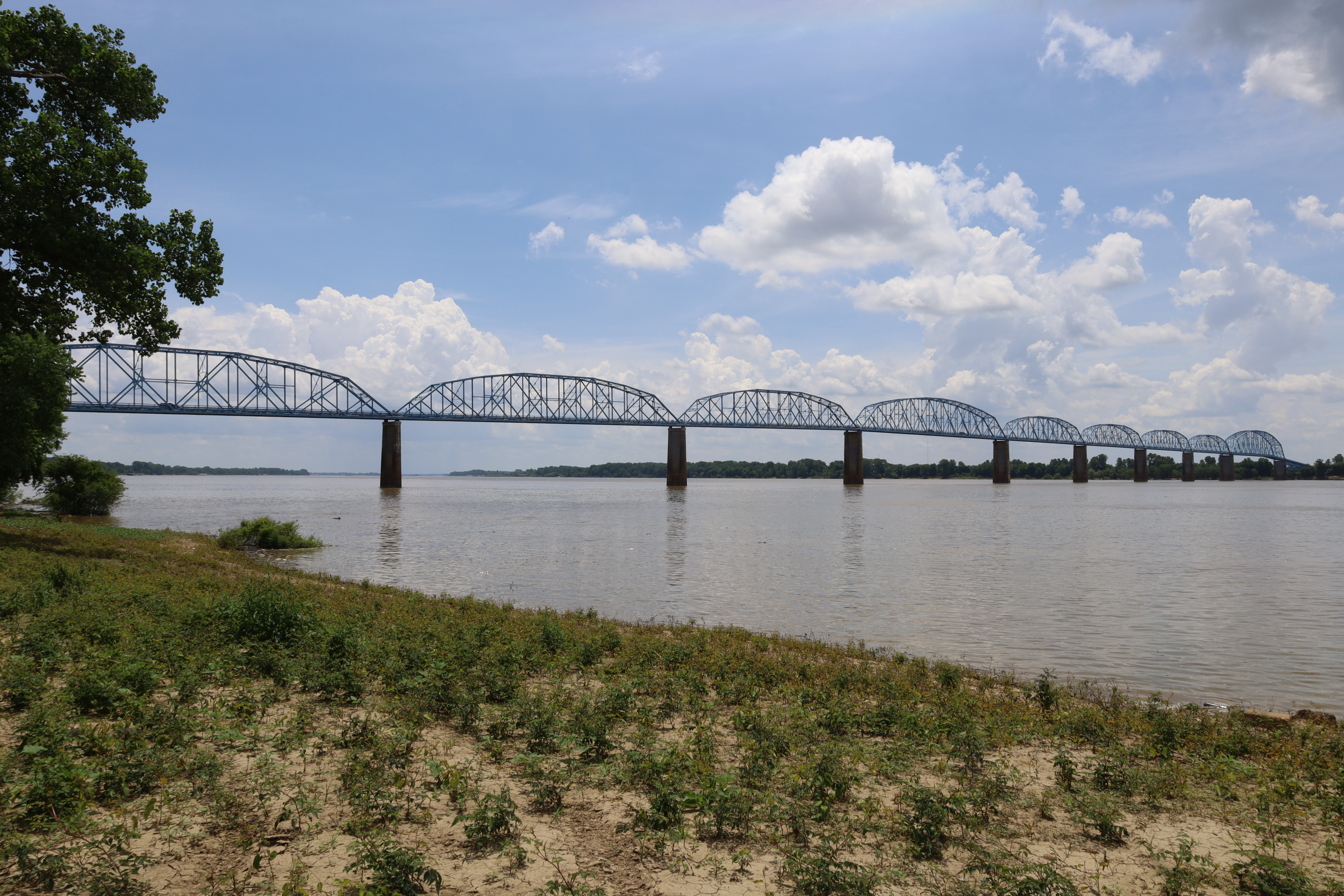
- The bridge in 2022
- Coordinates: 37.11465°N 88.62915°W
- Carries: 2 lanes of US 45
- Crosses: Ohio River
- Locale: Paducah, KY and Brookport, IL
- Official name: Irvin S. Cobb Bridge
- Maintained by: Kentucky Transportation Cabinet

Characteristics
- Design: Truss bridge
- Total length: 5,385.8 ft (1,641.6 m)
- Width: 19.7 ft (6.0 m)
- Longest span: 711.0 ft (216.7 m)
- Load limit: 15 short tons (13,607.8 kg)
- Clearance above: 9 ft 6 in (2.9 m)

History
- Construction end: 1929

Location
- Interactive map of Brookport Bridge

The Brookport Bridge (officially the Paducah-Brookport Bridge 1929–1943, and the Irvin S. Cobb Bridge since 1943) is a ten-span, steel deck (grate), narrow two-lane truss bridge that carries U.S. Route 45 (US 45) across the Ohio River in the U.S. states of Illinois and Kentucky. It connects Paducah, Kentucky, north to Brookport, Illinois.

== History ==
On February 4, 1927, Kentucky congressman Alben William Barkley introduced a bill authorizing the Paducah Board of Trade to construct the bridge. Following House and Senate passage, President Calvin Coolidge signed the bill on February 23. Paducah's Board of Trade consulted with several bond houses about financing, and the bid from Toledo's Stranahan, Harris & Otis was accepted on March 17, with construction cost then estimated as one to two million dollars. Traffic surveys—preliminaries to siting the bridge—began on March 24. The bridge was designed by the Kansas City firm of Harrington, Howard and Ashe, and construction was superintended by Chicago's P.W. Chapman & Company. The Paducah-Ohio River Bridge Company would be the bridge's legal owner-operator. The final obstacle to groundbreaking was surmounted upon obtaining the War Department's approval for the project on July 22.

Construction began in the fall of 1927 and continued year-round, sometimes slowed by high water on the Ohio River. As early as October 1928, the State of Kentucky proposed taking over the bridge and—once tolls had paid off its bonds—making passage toll-free. The Paducah-Brookport Bridge officially opened on Sunday, April 14, 1929, with a toll schedule of ten cents for pedestrians, bicyclists, and passengers on buses; fifty cents for horse-drawn vehicles; $1 for an automobile and its driver, with five cents added for each passenger; and higher tolls for trucks and other large vehicles. The bridge's final cost was approximately $2 million, and it was used by approximately 1200 automobiles on its first day in operation.

The bridge's formal dedication was on May 9, 1929, with thousands in attendance. The ceremonial ribbon-cutting by "Miss Paducah" Hazel Miller, and appearances of Paducah's and Brookport's mayors, were included in Paramount's newsreel celebrating these festivities. Sunday toll discounts, implemented soon after the bridge's opening, boosted tourism to Paducah and Brookport. By mid-August, all fares were reduced, and round-trip discounts offered: $1 for any automobile and its passengers, $1.25 for the two-way fare.

On October 23, 1929, a river steamer, the Chaperon—which was towing a showboat—struck a submerged concrete block below the bridge which had been created to facilitate construction but was unmarked by light or buoy. The Paducah-Brookport Bridge Company, along with the Milwaukee builder the Wisconsin Bridge and Iron Co., were sued for $40,000. The lawsuit was heard in Louisville on June 9 in the U.S. District Court in Louisville.

In 1932, the Paducah-Brookport Bridge Company indicated its willingness to explore a sale to the State of Kentucky. Until September 1933, that firm operated the bridge; whereupon the bridge's bondholders—in a procedure commonly used to protect such mortgages—sold the bridge in foreclosure to a Delaware-registered corporation supervised by the bondholders, the Kentucky-Illinois Bridge Corporation, for $300,000. During its first six years of operation, the bridge's average annual gross income from tolls were only about $69,000, and net losses for 1931–1933 alone totaled $457,509.40.

On February 15, 1935, the Kentucky State Highway Commission voted 6–2 to purchase the bridge for $800,000, subject to approval by the Federal court supervising its receivership status. On July 10, the state formally awarded $800,000 in bridge bonds, paying 3-1/2% annually for 20 years, to the Kentucky-Illinois Bridge Company, the bonds to be underwritten primarily through tolls; the bond transfer would be completed by August 15.

Brookport Bridge, northbound, September 2026

The State of Kentucky gradually reduced tolls. In February 1938, a 90-day experiment further lowered the passenger car fee to 25 cents each way, anticipating that increases in vehicle traffic would make up for the reduced fees, and the reduction was made permanent in June. By 1939, an average of 1000 vehicles daily were using the bridge. In February 1941, the toll for automobiles was again reduced, to 15 cents.

In November 1943, the structure was renamed the Irvin S. Cobb Bridge as a tribute to the state's famed journalist-humorist Irvin S. Cobb, a Paducah native. That same month, tolls were eliminated.

By the 1960s, a Paducah newspaper columnist was among those hoping for a modern replacement:

The Brookport bridge was built for the 1920s. It was magnificent then; it is old and outmoded and almost a bottleneck now....We’ve got an outmoded bridge that, in the near future, is going to be a bigger problem even than it is now....It’s just that you drive along the bridge and there is nothing but a rail between you and a mighty river; the bridge is scary. It will be as long as it is just an ordinary road hanging up there with nothing but rails on the side. You’ve got to widen it so that there’ll be some play between that road and the rails. But what really is needed is a new four-lane bridge which can carry traffic the way modern traffic must be carried....The best bet for a new bridge over the Ohio [River] here is for Interstate-24 to come close to here and cross the river near Metropolis. This is our only hope for a new bridge until time really runs its course the way it did with covered bridges.

The nearby four-lane Interstate 24 Bridge, three miles west of the Cobb bridge, was completed in 1974. The Cobb bridge—still the "Brookport bridge" to many locals—is presently challenging to cross, due to its very narrow lanes and steel grate deck. It is restricted to vehicles less than 8 feet (2.4 m) in width and 9.5 feet (2.9 m) in height, preventing most commercial vehicles from using the bridge.

== See also ==
- List of crossings of the Ohio River
