= Dixon, South Dakota =

Unincorporated community in Gregory County, South Dakota

Coordinates: 43°23′00″N 99°28′23″W

Dixon is an unincorporated community in Gregory County, in the U.S. state of South Dakota.

== History ==
Dixon was laid out in 1905, and named after Dixon, Illinois, the native home of a first settler. A post office was established at Dixon in 1905, and remained in operation until 1973.
