= Pope County, Illinois =

County in Illinois, United States

- County
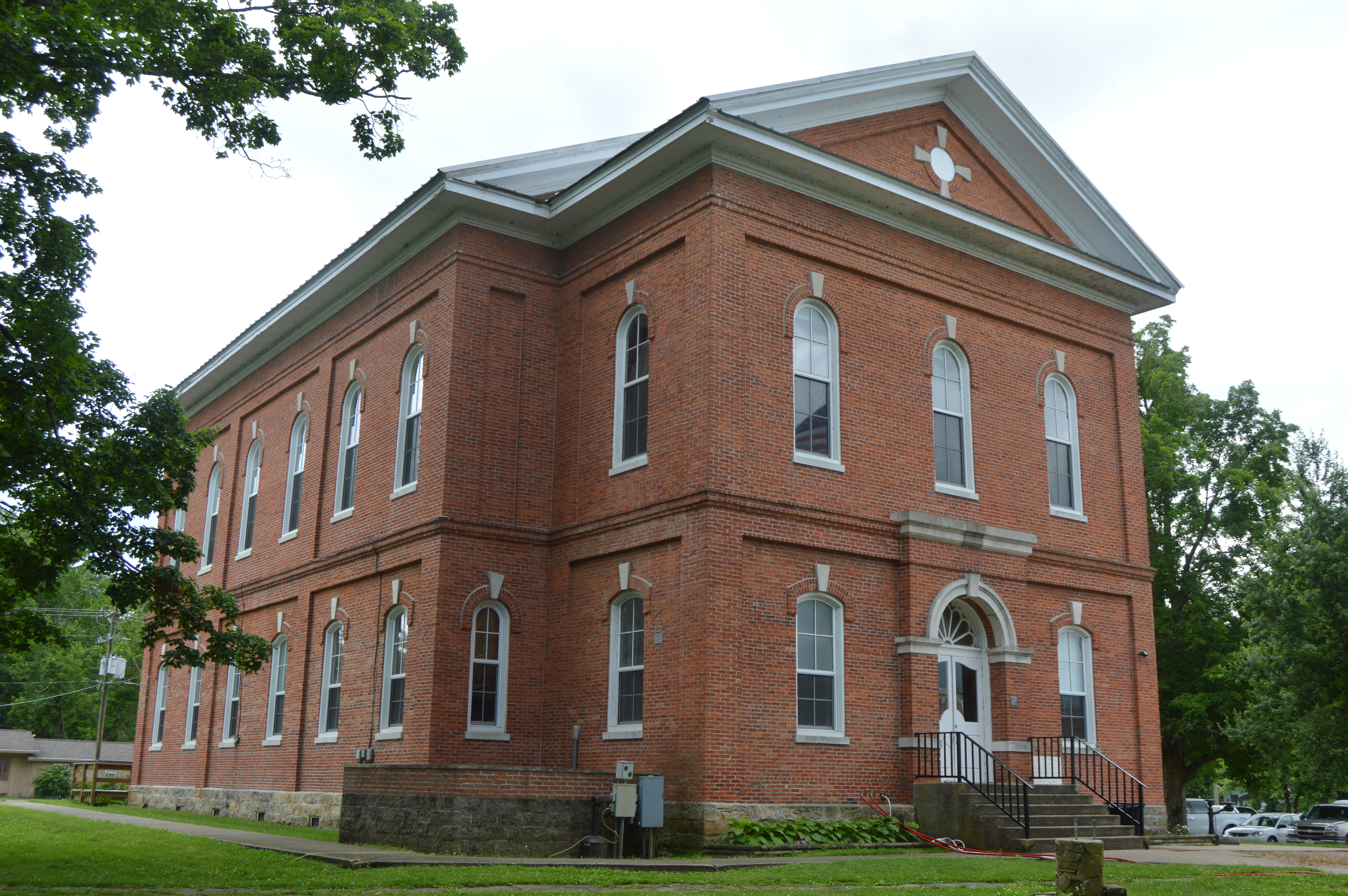
- Pope County Courthouse in Golconda

- Location within the U.S. state of Illinois
- Coordinates: 37°25′N 88°34′W
- Country: United States
- State: Illinois
- Founded: 1816
- Named for: Nathaniel Pope
- Seat: Golconda
- Largest city: Golconda

Area
  - Total: 374 sq mi (970 km^{2})
  - Land: 369 sq mi (960 km^{2})
  - Water: 5.5 sq mi (14 km^{2}) 1.5%

Population (2020)
  - Total: 3,763
  - Estimate (2025): 3,672 ▼
  - Density: 10.2/sq mi (3.94/km^{2})
- Time zone: UTC−6 (Central)
  - Summer (DST): UTC−5 (CDT)
- Congressional district: 12th

Pope County is the southeasternmost county in the U.S. state of Illinois. According to the 2020 census, it had a population of 3,763, making it the second-least populous county in Illinois. Its county seat is Golconda. The county was organized in 1816 from portions of Gallatin and Johnson counties and named after Nathaniel Pope, a politician and jurist from the Illinois Territory and State of Illinois.

== History ==
The first permanent settlement in future Pope County was established in 1798 at the modern-day site of Golconda, then a part of the Northwest Territory which operated as a ferry point across the Ohio River. The county was formed in 1816 from portions of Gallatin and Johnson Counties.

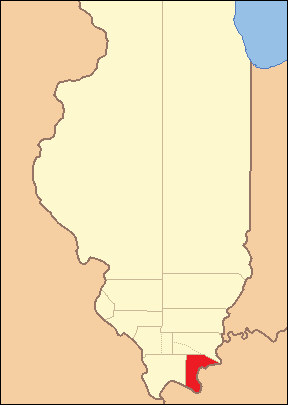
Pope County from the time of its creation in 1816 to 1839

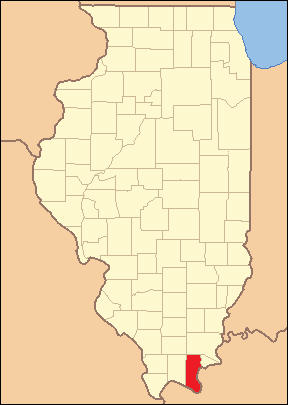
Pope County between 1839 and 1843

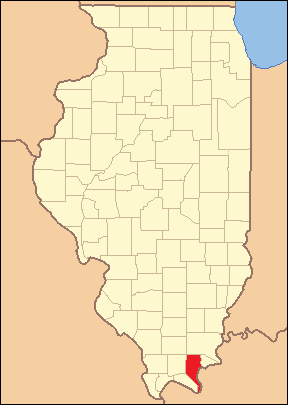
Pope County between 1843 and 1847

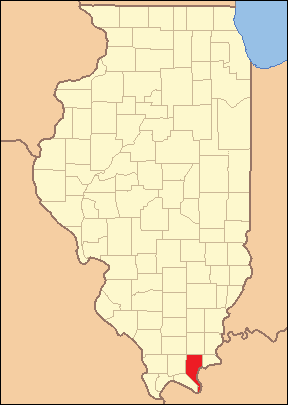
In 1847, Pope's border with Hardin County was adjusted, bringing both to their present borders

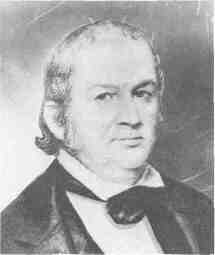
Nathaniel Pope, a politician and jurist from the Illinois Territory and State of Illinois was the Pope County namesake.

== Geography ==
According to the U.S. Census Bureau, the county has a total area of 374 square miles (970 km^{2}), of which 369 square miles (960 km^{2}) is land and 5.5 square miles (14 km^{2}) (1.5%) is water.

The entire county is hilly and during rainy weather rivulets cascade down the hills in the park forming waterfalls of varying sizes and heights. The county contains Dixon Springs State Park, one of many state parks in the Illinois Shawnee Hills, and is part of the Shawnee National Forest. It is bordered to the south and east by the Ohio River, which marks the state's border with Kentucky.

=== Climate and weather ===
Golconda, Illinois

Climate chart (precipitation, max. and min. temperature)
| J | F | M | A | M | J | J | A | S | O | N | D |
| 3.5 41 21 | 3.7 47 24 | 4.7 57 33 | 4.8 68 42 | 5 76 52 | 4.2 84 60 | 4.2 87 65 | 3.5 87 63 | 3.2 80 55 | 3.2 70 43 | 4.4 57 34 | 4.3 46 25 |
- █ Average max. and min. temperatures in °F
- █ Precipitation totals in inches
- Source: The Weather Channel
Metric conversion
| J | F | M | A | M | J | J | A | S | O | N | D |
| 88 5 −6 | 93 8 −4 | 120 14 1 | 121 20 6 | 128 24 11 | 106 29 16 | 107 31 18 | 89 31 17 | 82 27 13 | 82 21 6 | 112 14 1 | 109 8 −4 |
- █ Average max. and min. temperatures in °C
- █ Precipitation totals in mm

In recent years, average temperatures in the county seat of Golconda have ranged from a low of 21 °F (−6 °C) in January to a high of 87 °F (31 °C) in July, although a record low of −22 °F (−30 °C) was recorded in January 1994 and a record high of 104 °F (40 °C) was recorded in August 2007. Average monthly precipitation ranged from 3.22 inches (82 mm) in October to 5.02 inches (128 mm) in May.

=== Transit ===
- Rides Mass Transit District

=== Major highways ===
- Illinois Route 34
- Illinois Route 145
- Illinois Route 146
- Illinois Route 147

=== Adjacent counties ===
- Saline County - north
- Hardin County - east
- Livingston County, Kentucky - southeast
- Massac County - southwest
- Johnson County - west
- Williamson County - northwest

=== National protected area ===
- Shawnee National Forest (part)

== Demographics ==
Historical population
| Census | Pop. | Note | %± |
|---|---|---|---|
| 1820 | 2,610 | | — |
| 1830 | 3,316 | | 27.0% |
| 1840 | 4,094 | | 23.5% |
| 1850 | 3,975 | | −2.9% |
| 1860 | 6,742 | | 69.6% |
| 1870 | 11,437 | | 69.6% |
| 1880 | 13,256 | | 15.9% |
| 1890 | 14,016 | | 5.7% |
| 1900 | 13,585 | | −3.1% |
| 1910 | 11,215 | | −17.4% |
| 1920 | 9,625 | | −14.2% |
| 1930 | 7,996 | | −16.9% |
| 1940 | 7,999 | | 0.0% |
| 1950 | 5,779 | | −27.8% |
| 1960 | 4,061 | | −29.7% |
| 1970 | 3,857 | | −5.0% |
| 1980 | 4,404 | | 14.2% |
| 1990 | 4,373 | | −0.7% |
| 2000 | 4,413 | | 0.9% |
| 2010 | 4,470 | | 1.3% |
| 2020 | 3,763 | | −15.8% |
| 2025 (est.) | 3,672 | ▼ | −2.4% |
U.S. Decennial Census; 1790-1960 1900-1990; 1990-2000 2010-2017

=== 2020 census ===
As of the 2020 census, the county had a population of 3,763, the median age was 52.5 years, 18.5% of residents were under the age of 18, and 27.3% of residents were 65 years of age or older. For every 100 females there were 102.4 males, and for every 100 females age 18 and over there were 104.8 males age 18 and over.

The racial makeup of the county was 93.4% White, 1.1% Black or African American, 0.2% American Indian and Alaska Native, 0.5% Asian, less than 0.1% Native Hawaiian and Pacific Islander, 0.5% from some other race, and 4.4% from two or more races. Hispanic or Latino residents of any race comprised 1.9% of the population.

Less than 0.1% of residents lived in urban areas, while 100.0% lived in rural areas.

There were 1,694 households in the county, of which 25.1% had children under the age of 18 living in them. Of all households, 49.1% were married-couple households, 21.8% were households with a male householder and no spouse or partner present, and 23.6% were households with a female householder and no spouse or partner present. About 31.0% of all households were made up of individuals and 16.7% had someone living alone who was 65 years of age or older.

There were 2,355 housing units, of which 28.1% were vacant. Among occupied housing units, 81.8% were owner-occupied and 18.2% were renter-occupied. The homeowner vacancy rate was 3.6% and the rental vacancy rate was 9.6%.

=== Racial and ethnic composition ===
Pope County, Illinois – Racial and ethnic composition Note: the US Census treats Hispanic/Latino as an ethnic category. This table excludes Latinos from the racial categories and assigns them to a separate category. Hispanics/Latinos may be of any race.
| Race / Ethnicity (NH = Non-Hispanic) | Pop 1980 | Pop 1990 | Pop 2000 | Pop 2010 | Pop 2020 | % 1980 | % 1990 | % 2000 | % 2010 | % 2020 |
|---|---|---|---|---|---|---|---|---|---|---|
| White alone (NH) | 4,168 | 4,036 | 4,104 | 4,055 | 3,491 | 94.64% | 92.29% | 93.00% | 90.72% | 92.77% |
| Black or African American alone (NH) | 180 | 260 | 158 | 269 | 38 | 4.09% | 5.95% | 3.58% | 6.02% | 1.01% |
| Native American or Alaska Native alone (NH) | 8 | 14 | 30 | 28 | 1 | 0.18% | 0.32% | 0.68% | 0.63% | 0.03% |
| Asian alone (NH) | 8 | 6 | 12 | 11 | 16 | 0.18% | 0.14% | 0.27% | 0.25% | 0.43% |
| Native Hawaiian or Pacific Islander alone (NH) | x | x | 0 | 1 | 0 | x | x | 0.00% | 0.02% | 0.00% |
| Other race alone (NH) | 9 | 0 | 8 | 3 | 0 | 0.20% | 0.00% | 0.18% | 0.07% | 0.00% |
| Mixed race or Multiracial (NH) | x | x | 61 | 39 | 146 | x | x | 1.38% | 0.87% | 3.88% |
| Hispanic or Latino (any race) | 31 | 57 | 40 | 64 | 71 | 0.70% | 1.30% | 0.91% | 1.43% | 1.89% |
| Total | 4,404 | 4,373 | 4,413 | 4,470 | 3,763 | 100.00% | 100.00% | 100.00% | 100.00% | 100.00% |

=== 2010 census ===
As of the 2010 census, there were 4,470 people, 1,829 households, and 1,209 families living in the county. The population density was 12.1 inhabitants per square mile (4.7/km^{2}). There were 2,491 housing units at an average density of 6.8 per square mile (2.6/km^{2}). The racial makeup of the county was 91.7% white, 6.0% black or African American, 0.6% American Indian, 0.2% Asian, 0.5% from other races, and 0.9% from two or more races. Those of Hispanic or Latino origin made up 1.4% of the population. In terms of ancestry, 31.8% were German, 19.1% were Irish, 11.4% were English, and 5.4% were American.

Of the 1,829 households, 23.9% had children under the age of 18 living with them, 53.9% were married couples living together, 7.8% had a female householder with no husband present, 33.9% were non-families, and 29.8% of all households were made up of individuals. The average household size was 2.23 and the average family size was 2.72. The median age was 46.6 years.

The median income for a household in the county was $39,672 and the median income for a family was $51,500. Males had a median income of $45,865 versus $28,519 for females. The per capita income for the county was $20,134. About 6.6% of families and 12.4% of the population were below the poverty line, including 18.4% of those under age 18 and 9.1% of those age 65 or over.

== Politics ==
In its early days Pope County, being strongly Southern in its culture and opposed to Northern Illinois, was powerfully Democratic, giving a majority to that party in every pre-war Presidential election.

However, during the Civil War, under the influence of Congressman John A. Logan, this region of dubious initial loyalty was to provide a number of Union soldiers rivalled on a per capita basis only by a few fiercely Unionist counties in Appalachia.

Stephen A. Douglas in 1860 remains the last Democrat to win a majority of the county's vote, although Bill Clinton won pluralities in both 1992 and 1996 due to Ross Perot siphoning votes from Republican opponents George Bush senior and Bob Dole. Hillary Clinton in 2016 fared extremely poorly, carrying fewer than eighteen percent of Pope County's votes.

United States presidential election results for Pope County, Illinois
| Year | Republican | | Democratic | | Third party(ies) | |
| Year | No. | % | No. | % | No. | % |
|---|---|---|---|---|---|---|
| 1892 | 1,629 | 58.49% | 816 | 29.30% | 340 | 12.21% |
| 1896 | 1,852 | 62.95% | 1,074 | 36.51% | 16 | 0.54% |
| 1900 | 1,817 | 66.02% | 908 | 32.99% | 27 | 0.98% |
| 1904 | 1,744 | 68.58% | 676 | 26.58% | 123 | 4.84% |
| 1908 | 1,706 | 67.75% | 748 | 29.71% | 64 | 2.54% |
| 1912 | 1,099 | 45.81% | 664 | 27.68% | 636 | 26.51% |
| 1916 | 2,924 | 70.14% | 1,158 | 27.78% | 87 | 2.09% |
| 1920 | 2,486 | 77.42% | 687 | 21.40% | 38 | 1.18% |
| 1924 | 2,161 | 66.51% | 978 | 30.10% | 110 | 3.39% |
| 1928 | 2,004 | 74.06% | 679 | 25.09% | 23 | 0.85% |
| 1932 | 2,011 | 53.89% | 1,697 | 45.47% | 24 | 0.64% |
| 1936 | 2,787 | 61.28% | 1,728 | 37.99% | 33 | 0.73% |
| 1940 | 2,914 | 65.78% | 1,499 | 33.84% | 17 | 0.38% |
| 1944 | 2,305 | 72.99% | 813 | 25.74% | 40 | 1.27% |
| 1948 | 1,764 | 65.43% | 916 | 33.98% | 16 | 0.59% |
| 1952 | 1,947 | 67.53% | 933 | 32.36% | 3 | 0.10% |
| 1956 | 1,842 | 66.62% | 922 | 33.35% | 1 | 0.04% |
| 1960 | 1,689 | 63.38% | 971 | 36.44% | 5 | 0.19% |
| 1964 | 1,329 | 54.33% | 1,117 | 45.67% | 0 | 0.00% |
| 1968 | 1,307 | 57.63% | 732 | 32.28% | 229 | 10.10% |
| 1972 | 1,440 | 64.92% | 773 | 34.85% | 5 | 0.23% |
| 1976 | 1,187 | 52.18% | 1,070 | 47.03% | 18 | 0.79% |
| 1980 | 1,501 | 61.14% | 880 | 35.85% | 74 | 3.01% |
| 1984 | 1,545 | 62.00% | 940 | 37.72% | 7 | 0.28% |
| 1988 | 1,202 | 54.44% | 996 | 45.11% | 10 | 0.45% |
| 1992 | 951 | 39.44% | 1,063 | 44.09% | 397 | 16.47% |
| 1996 | 850 | 41.38% | 915 | 44.55% | 289 | 14.07% |
| 2000 | 1,346 | 57.77% | 927 | 39.79% | 57 | 2.45% |
| 2004 | 1,500 | 61.58% | 918 | 37.68% | 18 | 0.74% |
| 2008 | 1,343 | 60.20% | 845 | 37.88% | 43 | 1.93% |
| 2012 | 1,512 | 68.05% | 650 | 29.25% | 60 | 2.70% |
| 2016 | 1,678 | 78.34% | 375 | 17.51% | 89 | 4.15% |
| 2020 | 1,722 | 79.14% | 433 | 19.90% | 21 | 0.97% |
| 2024 | 1,698 | 79.53% | 416 | 19.48% | 21 | 0.98% |

== Communities ==
=== City ===
- Golconda

=== Village ===
- Eddyville

=== Unincorporated communities ===
- Allens Spring
- Bay City
- Brownfield
- Dixon Springs
- Glendale
- Hamletsburg
- Herod
- Homberg
- Lusk's Ferry
- McCormick
- New Liberty
- Rising Sun
- Robbs

== Notable people ==
- James Lusk Alcorn (1816-1894), born near Golconda, American Civil War general in the Confederate Army
- John R. Hodge (1893-1963), born in Golconda; Military Governor of South Korea preceding the Korean War and Commanding General of the U.S. Third Army
- C. L. McCormick (1919-1987), born in McCormick, Illinois state representative and businessman
- Green B. Raum (1820-1909), born in Golconda, American Civil War general in the Union Army
- James A. Rose (1850-1912), born in Golconda, Illinois Secretary of State
- Mason Ramsey (born 2006), raised in Golconda, country singer
- Victor Belenko (1947-2023) born in the USSR, served in the Soviet Air Force until he stole a MiG-25 and flew to Japan providing the West with invaluable intelligence. He became an American and settled in the town of Rosebud, where he died in 2023.

== See also ==
- Dixon Springs State Park
- Ku Klux Klan in Southern Illinois
- National Register of Historic Places listings in Pope County
- Ohio River
- Shawnee National Forest
