= Dixon Township =

Dixon Township may refer to the following townships in the United States:

- Dixon Township, Lee County, Illinois
- Dixon Township, Logan County, North Dakota
- Dixon Township, Ohio

== See also ==
- South Dixon Township, Lee County, Illinois
