= Adrienne Dixson =

American educational theorist

Academic background
- Education: Youngstown University; University of Michigan; University of Wisconsin–Madison

Academic work
- Discipline: Educational studies, critical race theory, Black feminism
- Institutions: Ohio State University; University of Illinois Urbana-Champaign; University of Kentucky; Pennsylvania State University

Adrienne Denise Dixson is an American educational theorist who heads the department of educational policy studies in the Penn State College of Education.

== Life ==
Dixson earned a B.A. in music theory with a minor in Black studies from the Dana School of Music at Youngstown University. She completed a M.A. in educational studies with a minor in sociology at the University of Michigan School of Education. She received a Ph.D. in multicultural education with a minor in Afro-American studies from the department of curriculum and instruction at the University of Wisconsin–Madison School of Education. Her dissertation was titled, Theorizing Black Women’s Pedagogy: the Pedagogical Practices and Philosophies of Black Women Teachers.

Dixson is a scholar of education studies and her research applies several frameworks including critical race theory and Black feminism. From 2004 to 2011, she was an associate professor at Ohio State University. She was a professor at the University of Illinois College of Education from 2011 to 2022 where served was also the interim director of the center for education in small urban communities in 2013. In 2021, she was elected a fellow of the American Educational Research Association. In 2022, she joined the University of Kentucky as a professor of educational leadership studies and the executive director of the education and civil rights initiative. In May 2024, Dixson was announced as the new head of the department of education policy studies in the Penn State College of Education, succeeding Kevin Kinser. She began the role on July 1, 2024 and held the position until May 2026.
