= Illinois Route 145 =

State highway in southern Illinois, US

Illinois Route 145
- IL 145 highlighted in red

Route information
- Maintained by IDOT
- Length: 43.47 mi (69.96 km)
- Existed: 1926–present

Major junctions
- South end: US 45 in Metropolis
- North end: US 45 / IL 34 in Harrisburg

Location
- Country: United States
- State: Illinois
- Counties: Massac, Pope, Saline

Highway system
- Illinois State Highway System; Interstate; US; State; Tollways; Scenic
← IL 143	→ IL 146

Illinois Route 145 is a north–south state road in southern Illinois. It splits off from U.S. Route 45 near Metropolis (across the Ohio River from Paducah, Kentucky) and runs north, rejoining U.S. 45 in Harrisburg. This is a distance of 43.47 miles (69.96 km).

== Route description ==
Illinois 145 runs through the central portion of Shawnee National Forest, and serves Dixon Springs State Park near Dixon Springs. It is a rural, two-lane road for its entire length. It is multi-plexed with Illinois 34 from its northern terminus at U.S. 45 in Harrisburg through Pankeyville and on to Mitchellsville where 34 spurs east to Rosiclaire. Between 34 and Eddyville is the small settlement of Delwood. The route also meets Illinois 147 6 miles south of Eddyville just north of Glendale. It connects with Illinois 146 just west of Dixon Springs. Eddyville Road which runs from Eddyville to just north of Golconda at Illinois 146 is a well maintained Pope County Route that serves as a shortcut from Eddyville to Golconda. In fact it saves several miles from having to drive south to 146 at Dixon Springs and then east on to Golconda.

On its original routing, Illinois 145 can be considered a spur of its "parent route", U.S. 45; with its extension in 1955, it can now be considered a "loop" of U.S. 45.

== History ==
SBI Route 145 originally ran from Metropolis north to Dixon Springs. In 1955 it was extended north to its current terminus.

== Major Intersections ==
County	Location	mi	km	Destinations	Notes
Massac		0.0	0.0	US 45 (Ohio River Scenic Byway)	Southern terminus of IL 145
Pope		15.5	24.9	IL 146	interchange
Pope		21.2	34.1	IL 147 west	Eastern terminus of IL 147
Saline		37.6	60.5	IL 34 south – Rosiclare	South end of IL 34 concurrency
Saline	Harrisburg	43.47	69.96	US 45 (Commercial St) / IL 34 north	Northern terminus of IL 145; north end of IL 34 concurrency
1.000 mi = 1.609 km; 1.000 km = 0.621 mi: Concurrency terminus
