= Dixon Springs State Park =

State park in Pope County, Illinois

- IUCN category III (natural monument or feature)
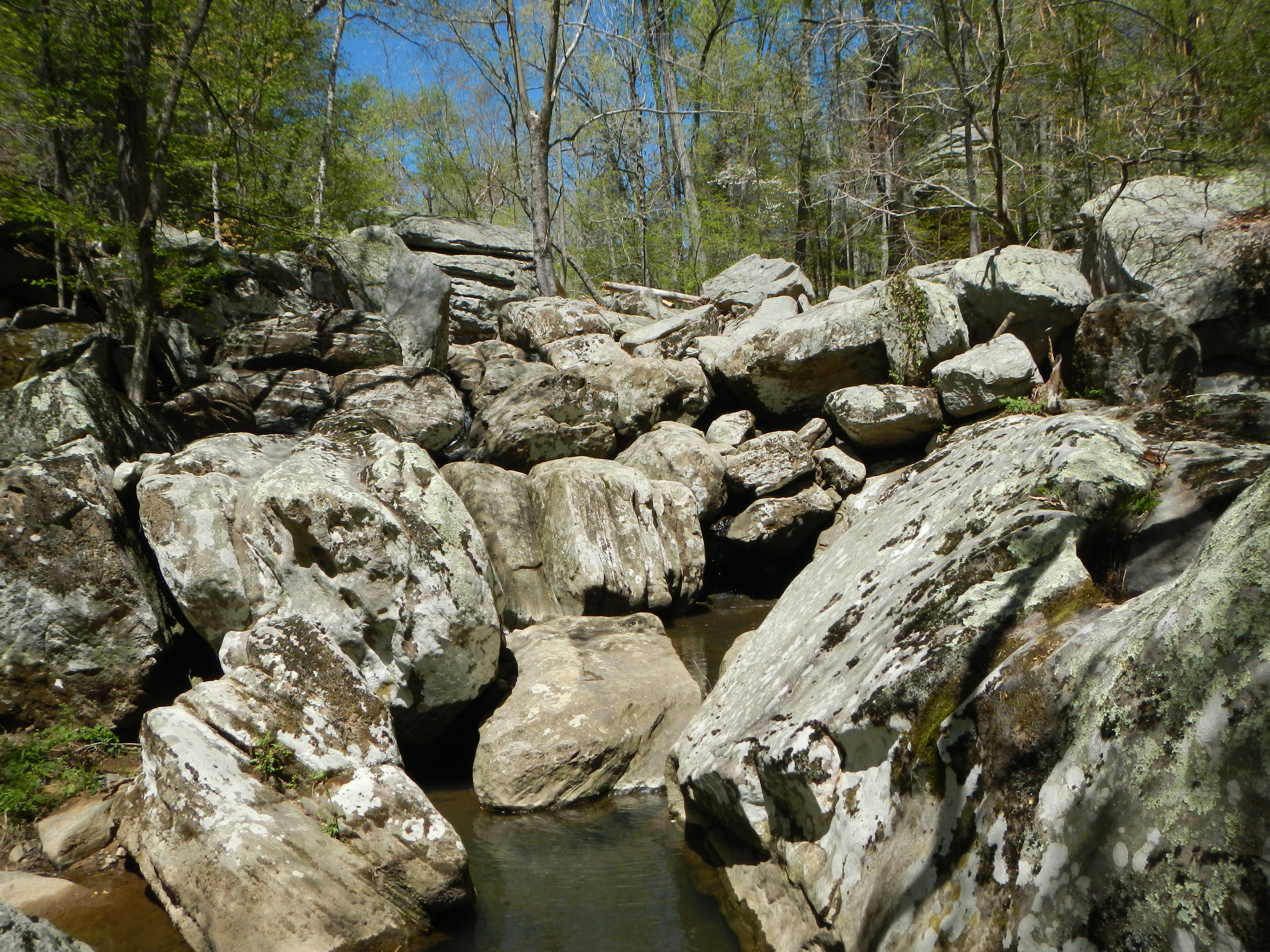
- Ghost Dance Canyon, Dixon Springs State Park, April 2014

- Location within Illinois Location within the United States
- Location: Pope County, Illinois, United States
- Nearest city: Golconda, Illinois
- Coordinates: 37°22′57″N 88°39′56″W
- Area: 801 acres (324 ha)
- Established: 1946
- Governing body: Illinois Department of Natural Resources

Dixon Springs State Park is an Illinois state park in Pope County, Illinois, United States, and is one of several state parks in the Illinois Shawnee Hills. The park is on a giant block of rock that was dropped 200 feet (61 m) along a fault that extends northwesterly across Pope County. The 801-acre (324 ha) park is about 10 miles (16 km) west of Golconda on Illinois Route 146, near its junction with Illinois Route 145. The first land acquisition was in 1946.
