= Brookport, Illinois =

- City
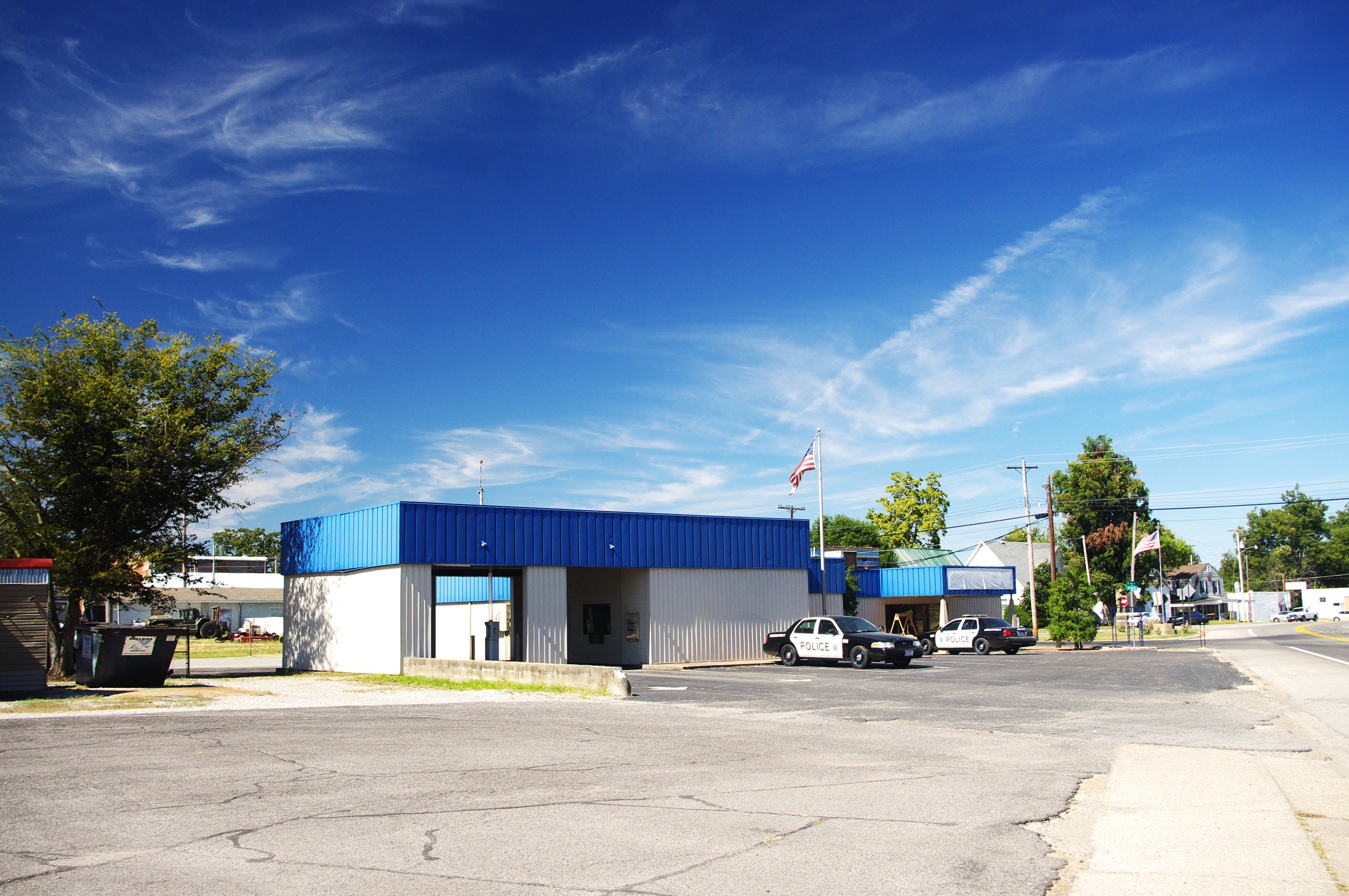
- City Hall

- Location in Massac County, Illinois
- Coordinates: 37°07′30″N 88°37′40″W
- Country: United States
- State: Illinois
- County: Massac

Area
  - Total: 0.66 sq mi (1.71 km^{2})
  - Land: 0.65 sq mi (1.69 km^{2})
  - Water: 0.0077 sq mi (0.02 km^{2})
- Elevation: 338 ft (103 m)

Population (2020)
  - Total: 725
  - Density: 1,110.5/sq mi (428.77/km^{2})
- Time zone: UTC-6 (CST)
  - Summer (DST): UTC-5 (CDT)
- ZIP Code: 62910
- Area code: 618
- FIPS code: 17-08706
- GNIS feature ID: 2393430

Brookport is a city in Massac County, Illinois, United States. The population was 725 at the 2020 census, down from 984 in 2010. It is part of the Paducah, KY-IL Metropolitan Statistical Area.

== History ==
Brookport was founded by Charles Pell in 1855. It was originally known as "Pellonia," after Pell. The small city declined within a few years, but saw a resurgence with the construction of the Illinois Central Railroad nearby in the late 1880s. It was reincorporated as "Brooklyn" in 1888. The name was changed to "Brookport", a portmanteau of "Brooklyn" and "port," in 1901.

== Geography ==
Brookport is located in southeastern Massac County on the north bank of the Ohio River, opposite Paducah, Kentucky. U.S. Route 45 traverses the city, connecting it with Paducah across the river to the south and Interstate 24 near Metropolis to the northwest. US 45 crosses the river on the Brookport Bridge, which is officially known as the "Irvin S. Cobb Bridge" in honor of author Irvin S. Cobb, who was born in Paducah. The two-lane steel deck truss bridge was completed in 1929. Ohio River Lock and Dam Number 52, operated by the United States Army Corps of Engineers, was located 1 mile (1.6 km) downstream from Brookport.

According to the U.S. Census Bureau, Brookport has a total area of 0.66 square miles (1.71 km^{2}), of which 0.01 square miles (0.03 km^{2}), or 1.06%, are water.

== Demographics ==
Historical population
Census	Pop.	Note	%±
1870	104		—
1890	216		—
1900	865		300.5%
1910	1,443		66.8%
1920	1,098		−23.9%
1930	1,336		21.7%
1940	1,247		−6.7%
1950	1,119		−10.3%
1960	1,154		3.1%
1970	1,046		−9.4%
1980	1,128		7.8%
1990	1,070		−5.1%
2000	1,054		−1.5%
2010	984		−6.6%
2020	725		−26.3%
U.S. Decennial Census

As of the U.S. census of 2000, there were 1,054 people, 450 households, and 283 families residing in the city. The population density was 1,321.8 inhabitants per square mile (510.3/km^{2}). There were 519 housing units at an average density of 650.9 per square mile (251.3/km^{2}). The racial makeup of the city was 90.61% White, 7.12% African American, 0.47% Native American, 0.28% Asian, 0.47% from other races, and 1.04% from two or more races. Hispanic or Latino of any race were 1.90% of the population.

There were 450 households, out of which 30.0% had children under the age of 18 living with them, 44.2% were married couples living together, 14.7% had a female householder with no husband present, and 37.1% were non-families. 33.8% of all households were made up of individuals, and 15.1% had someone living alone who was 65 years of age or older. The average household size was 2.34 and the average family size was 2.97.

In the city, the population was spread out, with 28.1% under the age of 18, 8.3% from 18 to 24, 26.7% from 25 to 44, 21.4% from 45 to 64, and 15.6% who were 65 years of age or older. The median age was 35 years. For every 100 females, there were 94.5 males. For every 100 females age 18 and over, there were 90.9 males.

The median income for a household in the city was $24,438, and the median income for a family was $30,000. Males had a median income of $31,250 versus $19,188 for females. The per capita income for the city was $11,751. About 16.2% of families and 19.8% of the population were below the poverty line, including 28.5% of those under age 18 and 17.5% of those age 65 or over.

== See also ==
- List of cities and towns along the Ohio River
