= Glendale, Illinois =

- Unincorporated community
- Location within Illinois Location within the United States
- Coordinates: 37°27′20″N 88°40′17″W
- Country: United States
- State: Illinois
- County: Pope
- Elevation: 407 ft (124 m)
- Time zone: UTC-6 (Central (CST))
  - Summer (DST): UTC-5 (CDT)
- Area code: 618
- GNIS feature ID: 409067

Glendale is an unincorporated community in Pope County, Illinois, United States. Glendale is located on Illinois Route 145, 5.5 miles (8.9 km) southwest of Eddyville.
