= Dickson =

Dickson may refer to:

== People ==
- Dickson (given name)
- Dickson (surname)

== Places ==
In Australia:

- Dickson, Australian Capital Territory in Canberra
- Dickson College in Canberra
- Dickson Centre, Australian Capital Territory in Canberra
- Division of Dickson, Electoral Division, Queensland

In Canada:

- Dickson, Alberta
- Dickson Hill, Ontario

In Greenland:

- Dickson Fjord

In Malaysia:

- Port Dickson, Negeri Sembilan

In Russia:

- Dikson (urban-type settlement), Krasnoyarsk Krai (named for Oscar Dickson)

In the United States:

- Dickson, Alaska
- Dickson, Oklahoma
- Dickson, Tennessee
- Dickson City, Pennsylvania
- Dickson County, Tennessee
- Dickson Township, Michigan
- Dickson Tavern Erie, PA Historical Building
- Dickson, West Virginia

== Lakes ==
- Dickson Lake in Argentina and Chile

== Literature ==
- Dickson!, a collection of short stories by Gordon R. Dickson

== Ships ==
- SS Dickson, a cargo ship leased to the Soviet Union during the Second World War

== Other ==
- a 6-row barley variety
- Father Dickson Cemetery, Crestwood, St. Louis County, Missouri

== See also ==
- Dikson (disambiguation)
- Dixon (disambiguation)
