= Dixon Springs, Illinois =

- Unincorporated community
- Location within Illinois Location within the United States
- Coordinates: 37°23′04″N 88°40′07″W
- Country: United States
- State: Illinois
- County: Pope
- Elevation: 486 ft (148 m)
- Time zone: UTC-6 (Central (CST))
  - Summer (DST): UTC-5 (CDT)
- Area code: 618
- GNIS feature ID: 407260

Dixon Springs is an unincorporated community in Pope County, Illinois, United States. Dixon Springs is 10 miles (16 km) west of Golconda.

== History ==
Dixon Springs was named after William Dixon, the first settler, in 1848. In the early 1900s it became a favorite summer resort.

A post office named Dixon Springs operated from 1905 to 1962.

== Attractions ==
Dixon Springs park is located in the village. It has play places and a swimming pool with a waterslide. The chocolate factory is another favorite thing to do and serves chocolate and ice cream.
