= Olmstead station =

Historic railroad station in Illinois

Olmsted
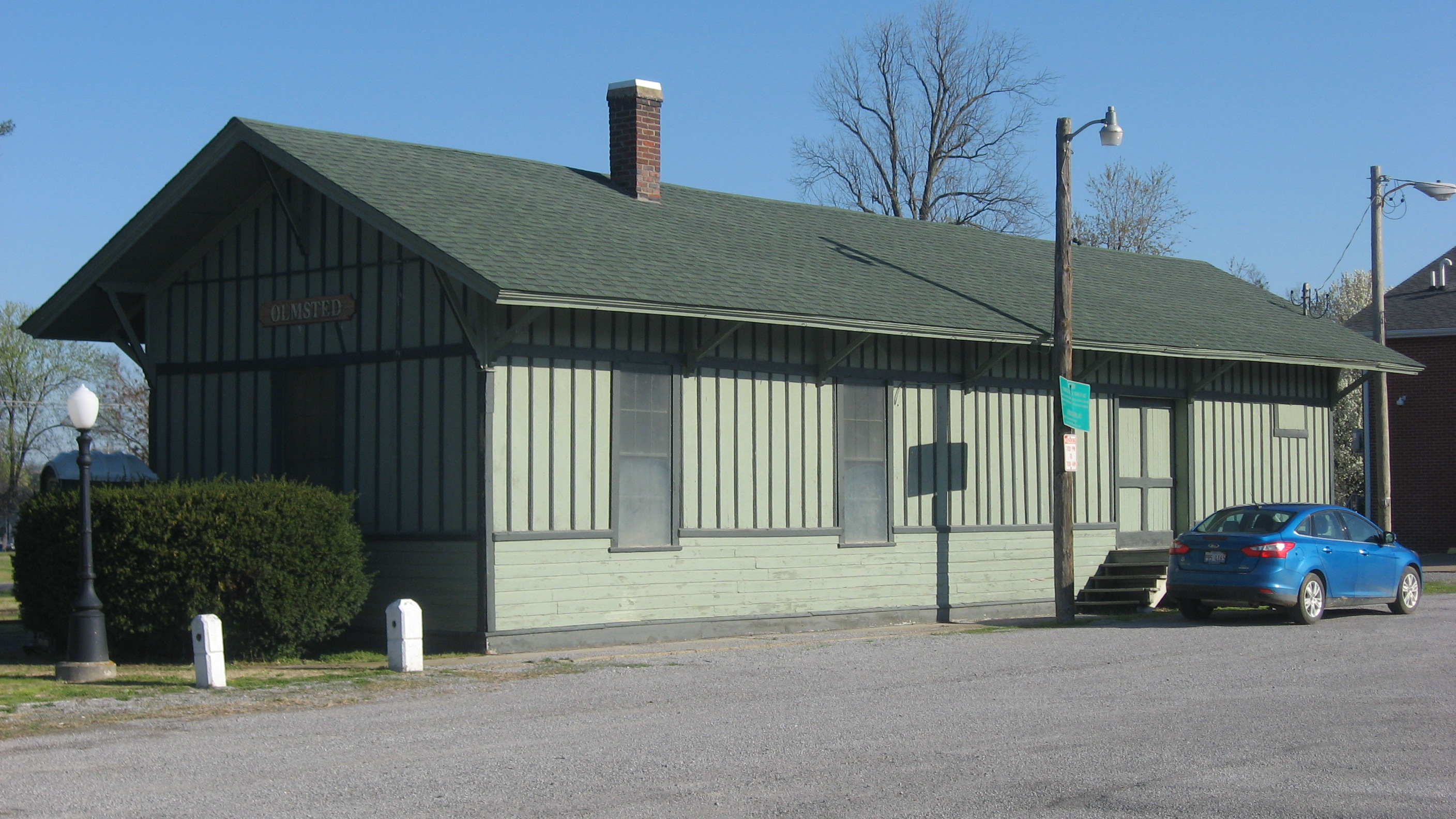
- Front and southern side of the Olmsted depot.

General information
- Location: Front Street and Caledonia Avenue, Olmsted, Pulaski County, Illinois 62970
- Line: Cairo Division

History
- Closed: 1955

Services
Preceding station	New York Central Railroad	Following station
Grand Chain toward Danville	Cairo Division	America toward Cairo
- Olmstead Depot
- U.S. National Register of Historic Places
- Location within Illinois
- Location: Front St. and Caledonia Ave., Olmsted, Pulaski County, Illinois, USA
- Coordinates: 37°10′51″N 89°5′11″W
- NRHP reference No.: 89002101
- Added to NRHP: December 15, 1989
Location

Olmstead is a historic railroad station in Olmsted, Illinois. The station was built in 1872 by the Cairo and Vincennes Railroad. The railroad provided passenger and freight service to the town. Freight trains imported merchandise for the town's shops and exported goods such as chickens, mussel shells, and agricultural products. The passengers brought in by the trains also improved the town's economy by increasing sales for its businesses. The Cleveland, Cincinnati, Chicago and St. Louis Railway operated the station after it acquired the Cairo and Vincennes Railroad. Service to the station ended in 1955.

The station was listed on the National Register of Historic Places on December 15, 1989, as the Olmstead Depot.
