= Colonel Plug =

American river pirate

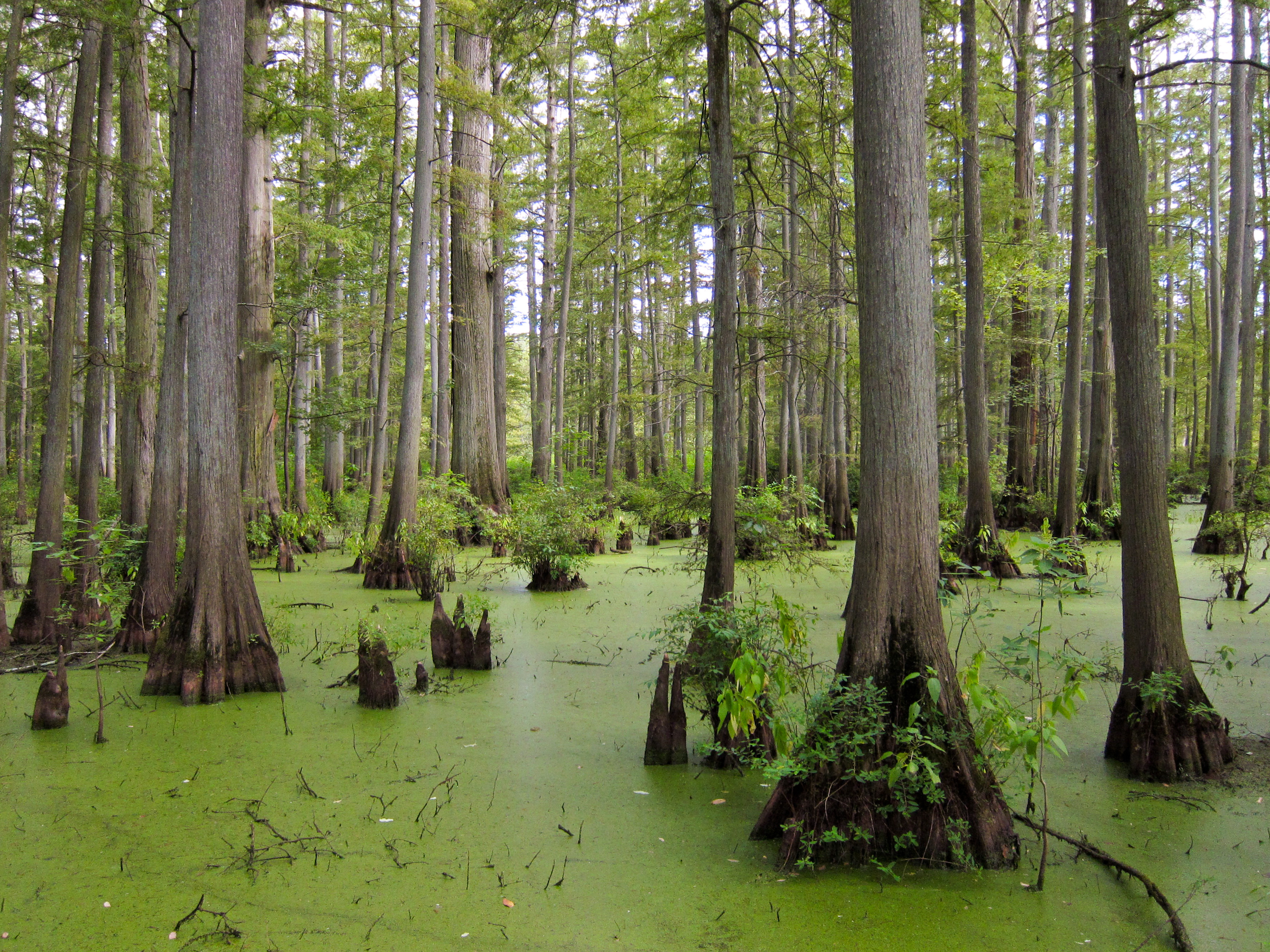
- Colonel Plug and his gang of river pirates patrolled the Cache River cypress swamp, of Southern Illinois, near the confluence of the Ohio and Mississippi Rivers, hunting down helpless and unsuspecting river travelers, to attack, rob, and murder, between the 1790s–1820.
- Born: Rockingham County, New Hampshire, US
- Died: 1820? Cache River, present-day Pulaski County, Illinois?
- Resting place: Cache River, present-day Pulaski County, Illinois?
- Other names: Colonel Fluger, Colonel Flueger, Colonel Pflueger, Col. Plug, Last of the Boat-wreckers
- Occupations: river pirate, criminal gang leader, state militia officer
- Spouse: Pluggy

Cache River Pirates
- Founded by: Colonel Plug, Nine-Eyes
- Founding location: Cache River, at the confluence of the Ohio River, just above the Mississippi River, in Southern Illinois
- Years active: 1790s–1820
- Territory: Ohio and Mississippi Rivers, Southern Illinois, Western Kentucky
- Ethnicity: European-American, African-American
- Membership (est.): ?
- Criminal activities: river piracy, theft, fencing stolen goods, murder
- Rivals: Samuel Mason (river pirate)

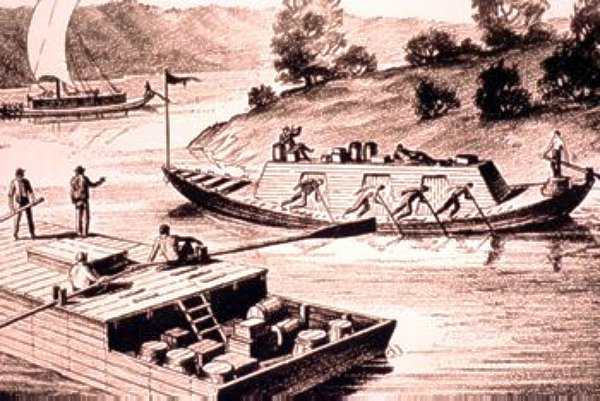
Colonel Plug and the Cache River pirates chose flatboats, keelboats, and rafts, as profitable targets, to attack, because of the valuable and plentiful cargo on board and the crews could be easily overwhelmed and killed.

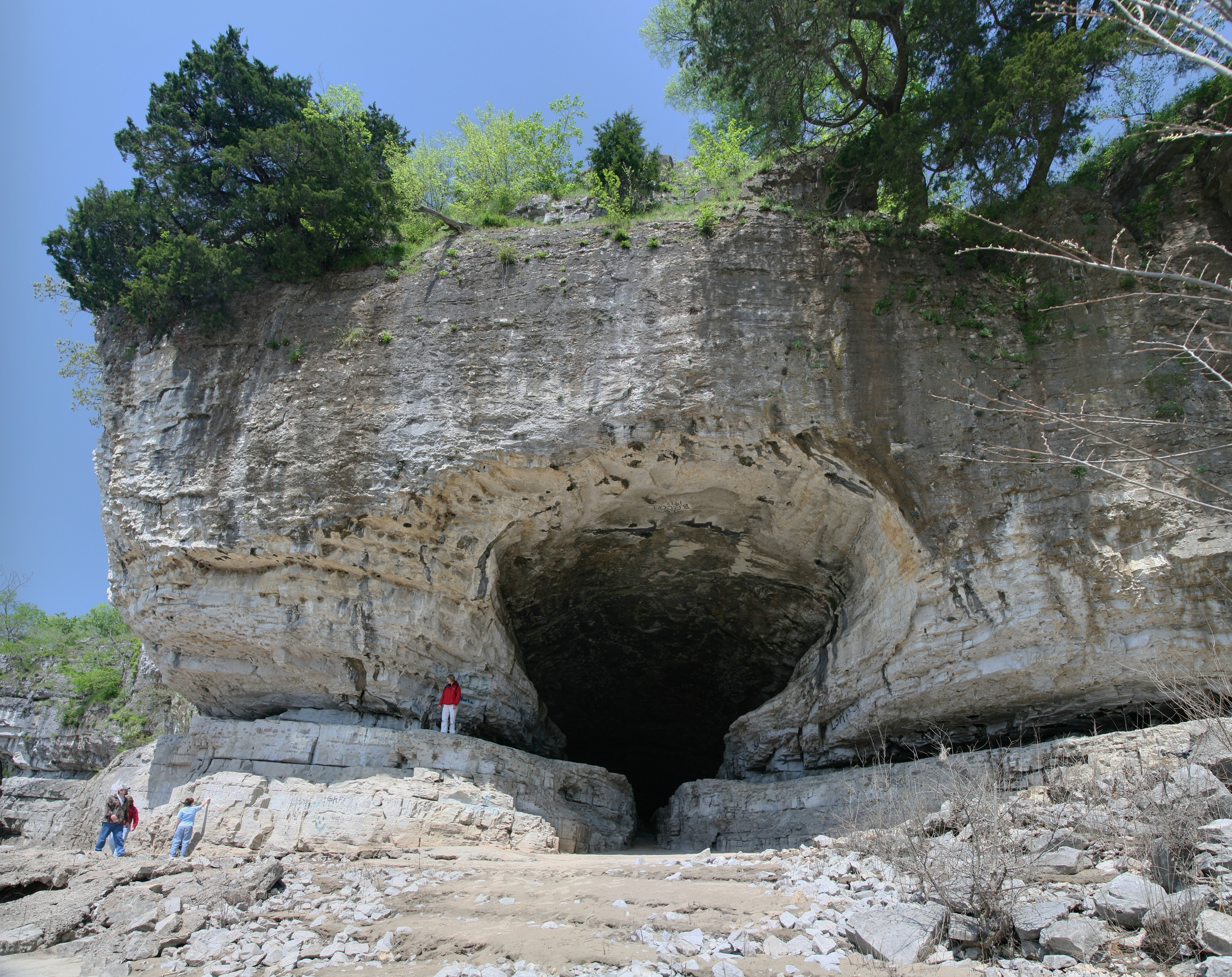
The infamous outlaw haunt of Cave-in-Rock on the Ohio River the real-life river pirate Samuel Mason led a gang of river pirates, from 1797 to 1799 who the legendary Colonel Plug may have been based on

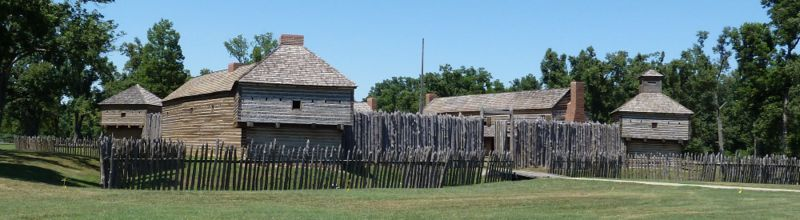
Fort Massac, down river, from Cave-in-Rock and above the Cache River which was a U.S. Army frontier post that policed the Ohio River looking for pirates like Colonel Plug and his gang.

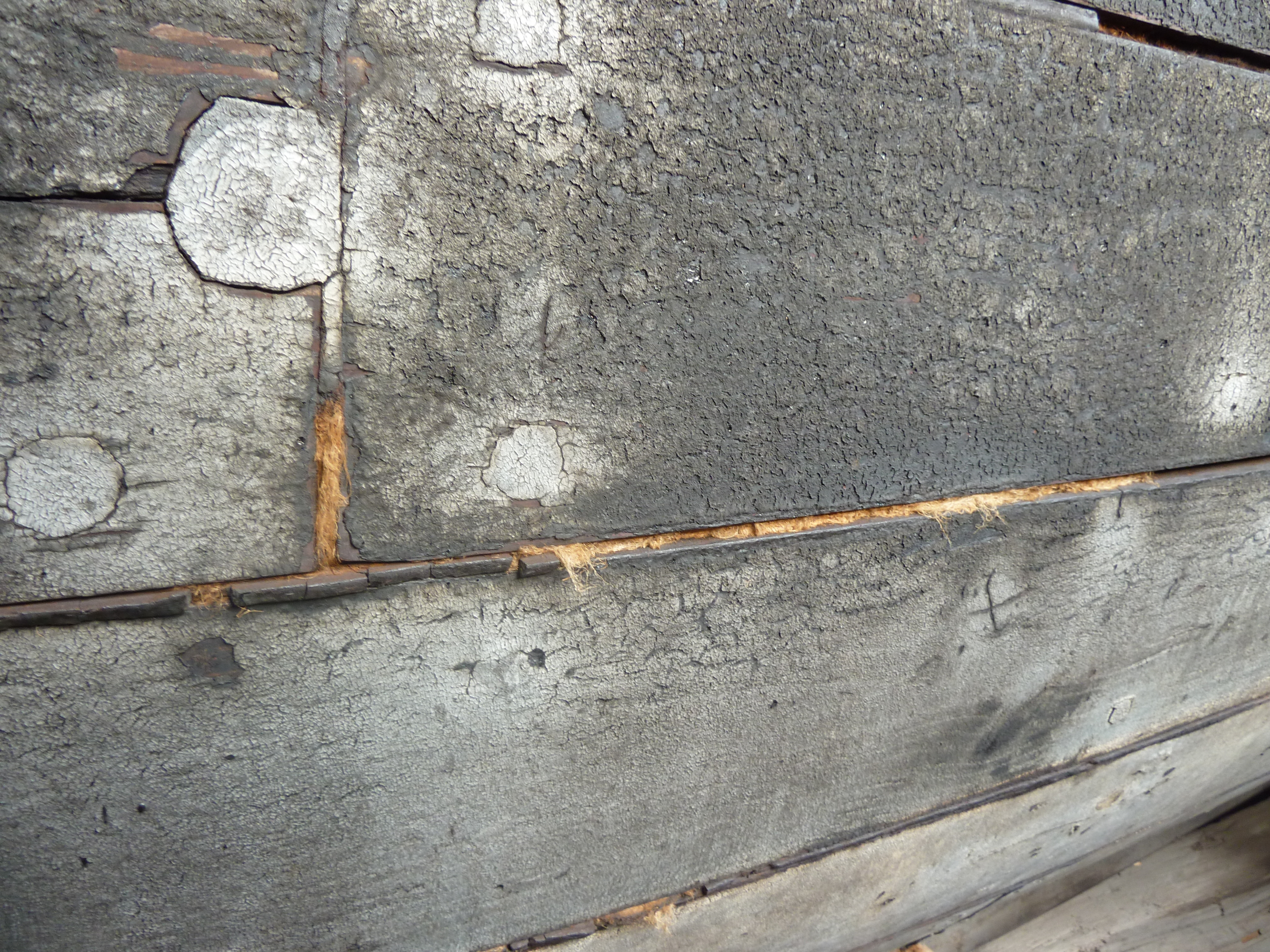
Wooden boat hull planks with watertight seams wedged together used traditional caulking made from the combined fibers of cotton and oakum, a type of hemp rope fiber soaked in pine tar

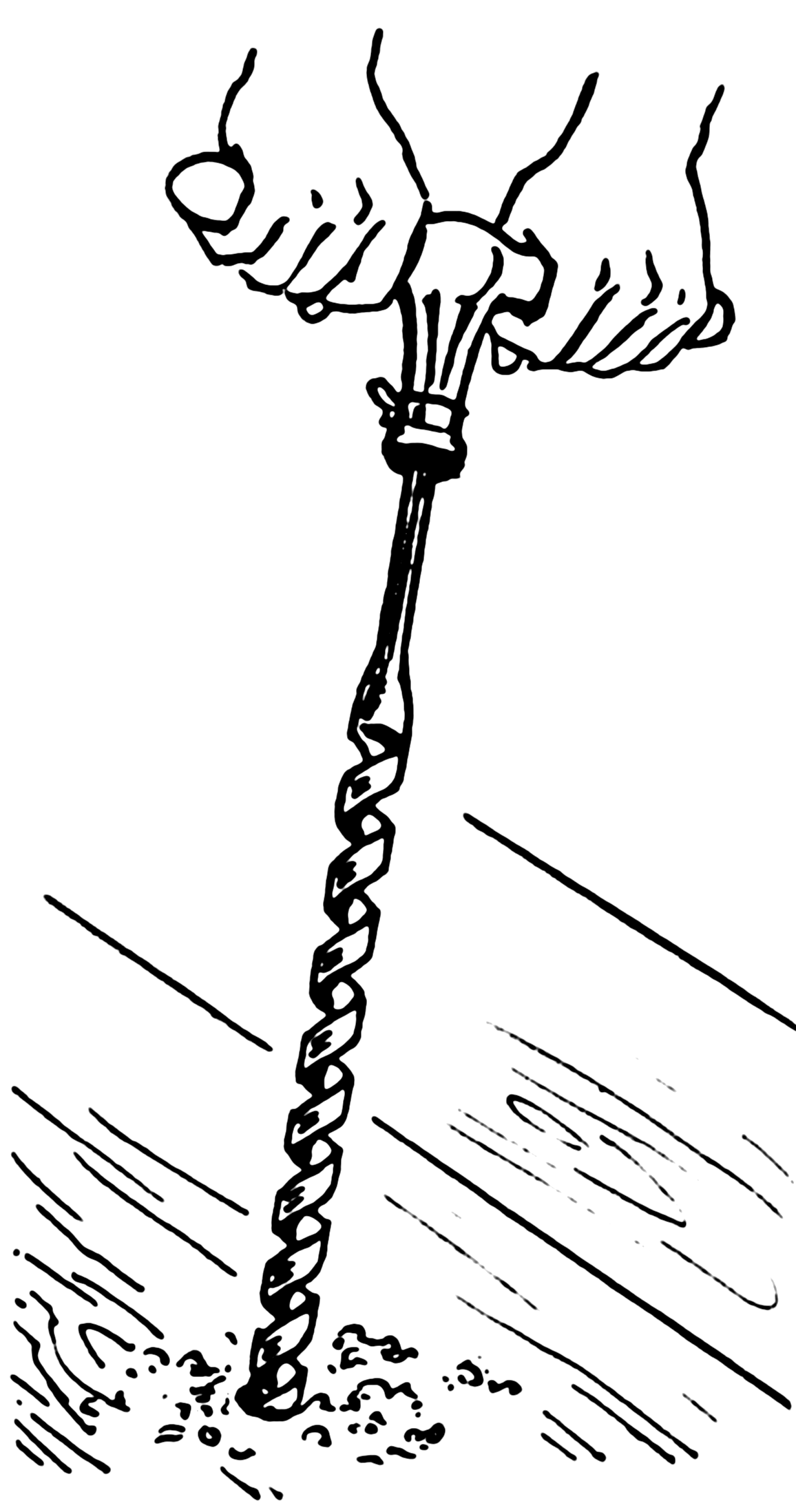
An auger the drilling tool used by Colonel Plug and his river pirates

Colonel Plug (1700s? – 1820?), also known as Colonel Fluger and "The Last of the Boat-Wreckers", who existed sometime between the 1790s and 1820, was the legendary river pirate who ran a criminal gang on the Ohio River in a cypress swamp near the mouth of the Cache River. The outlaw camp of Colonel Plug was supposedly below the river pirate hideout of Cave-In-Rock and the U.S. Army post at Fort Massac, which monitored and policed frontier river traffic just above the confluence of the Ohio and Mississippi Rivers.

== Cache River swamp and Ohio River juncture ==
French-Canadien voyageurs gave the Cache River its name, which meant "secret or hidden place". The first European settlers came into this swampy river country in 1803. The waterlogged river soil was too wet for farming, and the cypress swamps were populated with mosquitoes and venomous snakes. Many of the settlers along the Cache became sick and died of malaria. Because the Cache River was such an undesirable and nearly uninhabitable place, the poor living conditions in the region were ideal for concealing the illicit activities of river piracy.

== Colonel Plug tactics ==
Colonel Plug's usual tactics were to sneak aboard or have one of his river pirates, secretly, go into the hull of a boat, dig out the caulking between the boat bottom planks, causing the boat to sink and be easily attacked. The other method for disabling a boat was to drill holes in the bottom planks, with an auger.

Traditional caulking was made from combining the fibers of cotton and oakum, a type of hemp rope fiber soaked in pine tar. The sticky caulk mixture would be driven into a wedge-shaped seam between the wooden boat hull planks, with a caulking mallet and a broad chisel-like tool called a caulking iron to create a watertight seal.

The salvaged boat and cargo would later, be sold, down the Mississippi River, in New Orleans and along other river town ports. Plug eventually drowned, being unable to escape from being trapped inside the bottom of a rapidly sinking boat.

== Physical appearance ==
According to Cincinnati newspaperman Timothy Flint in 1830, Colonel Plug was described as:

But being a youth of broad red cheeks, muscle and impudence, and withal, abundantly stored with small talk, from eighteen to twenty-one he was a decided favorite with the fair, and had had various love affairs, being reputed remarkably slippery in regard to the grace of perseverance. At twenty four he had mounted epaulettes, was a militia colonel, had a portentous red nose, and was in bad odour with all honest people.

== Colonel Plug wife and river pirate gang ==
Colonel Plug had a wife, known as "Pluggy", a very large, copper complected, mustached, quadroon woman of three mixed races. He had a partner and second in command, of the river pirate gang, named "Nine-Eyes", who may have been an escaped slave, manumitted former slave, or free-born negro.

== Historical research and folklore ==
Tales of Colonel Plug may have been based on the real life, Cave-In-Rock river pirate, Samuel Mason or by his alias, "Bully Wilson". Little is known about Colonel Plug, if he was actually a real person or a just a fictional river pirate character, except, from the folklorish descriptions provided by Timothy Flint in his 1830 newspaper article "Col. Plug, the last of the Boat-wreckers," from the Cincinnati, Ohio newspaper, The Western Monthly Review and another article "The Boat-Wreckers—Or Banditti of the West," in the Rochester, New York newspaper, Daily Advertiser, January 29, 1830, very little historical evidence exists about Colonel Plug to prove he actually lived.

Colonel Plug claimed to have been a Yankee native from Rockingham County, New Hampshire and a former colonel in the New Hampshire Militia. Colonel Fluger may have been of German ancestry, as Fluger is a German surname. No historical evidence exists to justify this military claim, as no Fluger, Flueger, or Pflueger surnames, as many spelling variations exist, can be found in the New Hampshire U.S. census records or the Rockingham County military muster rolls.

== Decline of river piracy ==
After the arrival of the first steamboat, New Orleans, on the Ohio and Mississippi Rivers in 1811, the year of the cataclysmic New Madrid earthquake, river piracy began to decline because these new boats were faster and harder to ambush and would not have had to stop as often for fueling, rest, supplies, or shelter from a storm. Also, keelboat crews came to eventually travel together in naval flotillas, with large groups of guards to protect their cargo from any criminal elements they found on the rivers.

== In popular culture ==
Actor Walter Catlett portrayed the historical river pirate and criminal gang leader, Colonel Plug inaccurately as a comical mischief maker, not as ruthless outlaw in the Walt Disney's Disneyland's, live-action miniseries, in season 2, episode 13, Davy Crockett and the River Pirates, which aired December 14, 1955.

== Brewing industry ==
In 2013, the microbrewery Listermann Brewing Company of Cincinnati, Ohio has produced Colonel Plug (Kentucky Style Common Ale), a sour mash ale aged in oak barrels.

== See also ==
- Peter Alston
- Philip Alston
- James Ford (pirate)
- Wiley Harpe
- Samuel Mason
- John Murrell (bandit)
- Stack Island (Mississippi River)
- Tower Rock
