= Pulaski County Courthouse =

Pulaski County Courthouse may refer to:

- Pulaski County Courthouse (Arkansas), Little Rock, Arkansas
- Pulaski County Courthouse (Georgia), Hawkinsville, Georgia
- Pulaski County Courthouse (Illinois), Mound City, Illinois
- Pulaski County Courthouse (Indiana), Winamac, Indiana
- Pulaski County Courthouse (Missouri), Waynesville, Missouri
- Pulaski County Courthouse (Virginia), Pulaski, Virginia
