= Pulaski, Illinois =

Pulaski
- Village
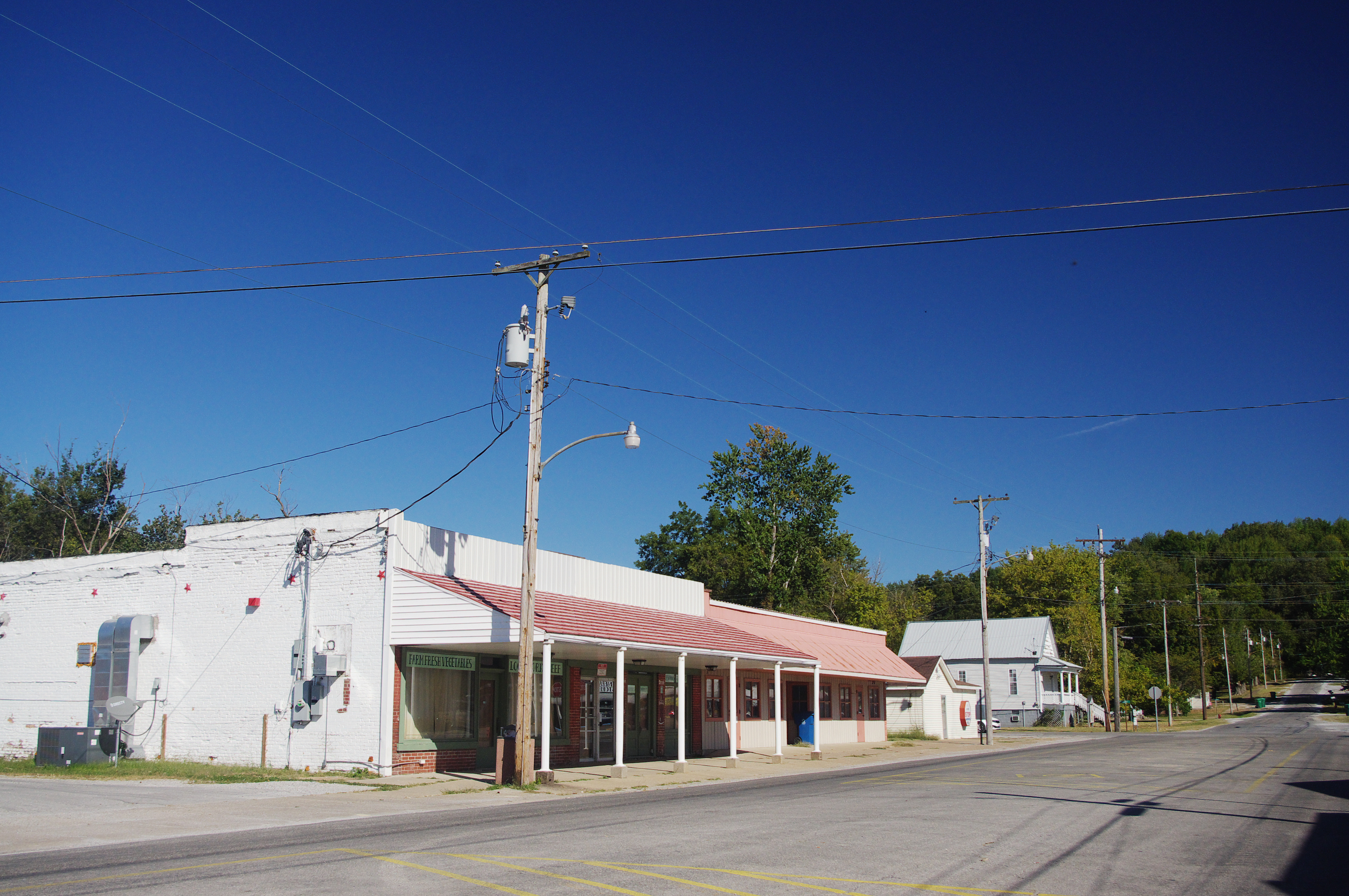
- Commercial Avenue

- Location of Pulaski in Pulaski County, Illinois.

- Location of Illinois in the United States
- Coordinates: 37°13′0″N 89°12′22″W
- Country: United States
- State: Illinois
- County: Pulaski

Area
  - Total: 1.32 sq mi (3.41 km^{2})
  - Land: 1.31 sq mi (3.39 km^{2})
  - Water: 0.0039 sq mi (0.01 km^{2})
- Elevation: 335 ft (102 m)

Population (2020)
  - Total: 154
  - Density: 118/sq mi (45.4/km^{2})
- Time zone: UTC-6 (CST)
  - Summer (DST): UTC-5 (CDT)
- ZIP Code(s): 62976
- Area code: 618
- FIPS code: 17-62211
- GNIS feature ID: 2399029
- Wikimedia Commons: Pulaski, Illinois

Pulaski is a village in Pulaski County, Illinois, United States. As of the 2020 census, Pulaski had a population of 154. The village is named in honor of Polish Revolutionary War hero Casimir Pulaski.

== History ==
Pulaski was founded in 1852 as a construction camp along the Illinois Central Railroad. A post office was established in 1856. The village was initially known as "Camp Pulaski," but the "Camp" was dropped from the name in 1872. Pulaski incorporated in 1898.

== Geography ==
Pulaski is located at 37°13′0″N 89°12′22″W (37.216751, -89.206127). The village lies in the Cache River basin north of Cairo. It straddles Old U.S. Highway 51 and is west of Interstate 57. Pulaski is west of the Ohio River.

According to the 2010 census, Pulaski has a total area of 1.316 square miles (3.41 km^{2}), of which 1.31 square miles (3.39 km^{2}) (or 99.54%) is land and 0.006 square miles (0.02 km^{2}) (or 0.46%) is water.

== Demographics ==
Historical population
Census	Pop.	Note	%±
1880	77		—
1900	424		—
1910	592		39.6%
1920	518		−12.5%
1930	521		0.6%
1940	623		19.6%
1950	478		−23.3%
1960	415		−13.2%
1970	471		13.5%
1980	477		1.3%
1990	361		−24.3%
2000	274		−24.1%
2010	206		−24.8%
2020	154		−25.2%
U.S. Decennial Census

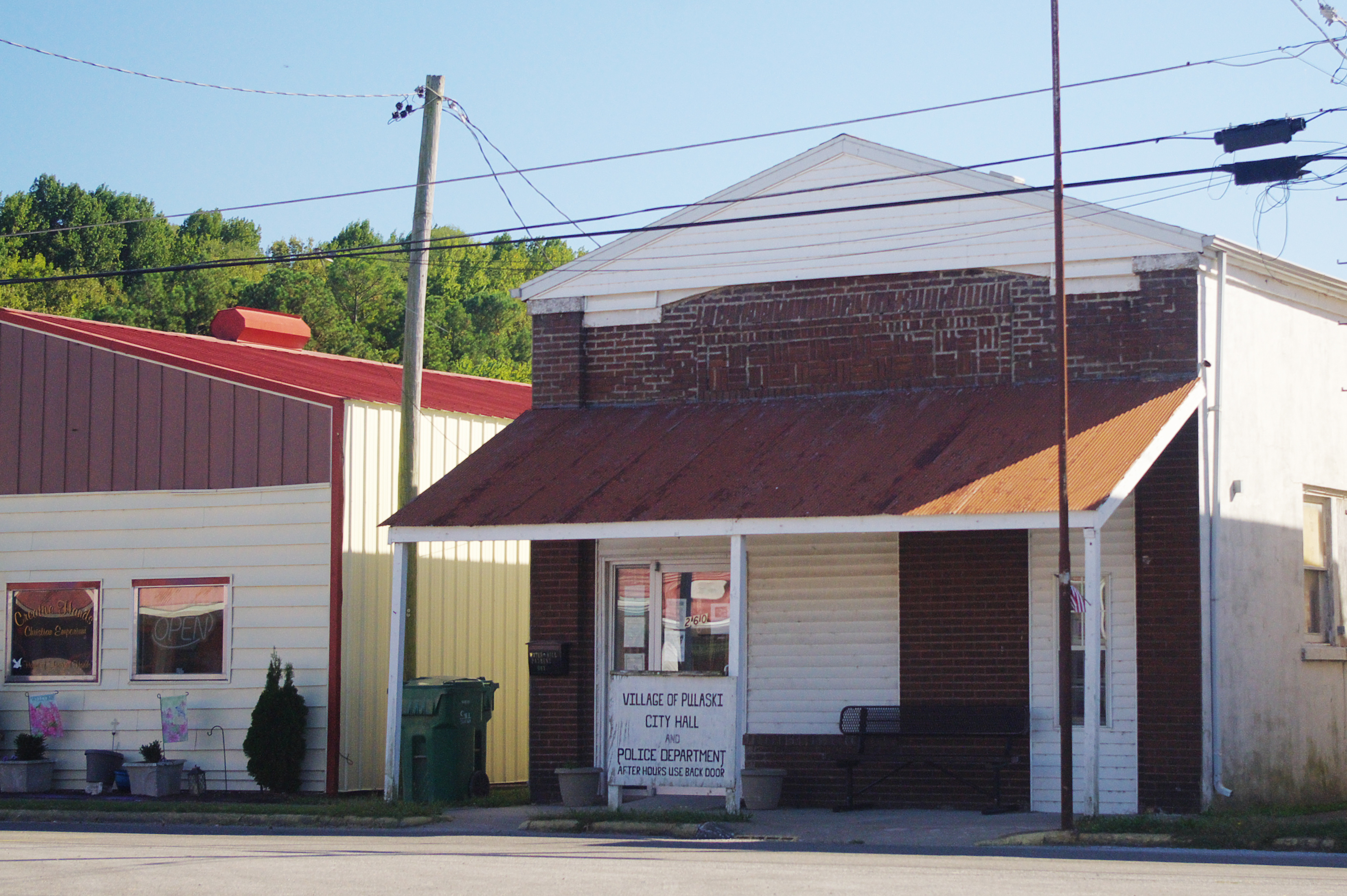
Pulaski Village Hall

=== Racial and ethnic composition ===
Pulaski village, Illinois – Racial and ethnic composition Note: the US Census treats Hispanic/Latino as an ethnic category. This table excludes Latinos from the racial categories and assigns them to a separate category. Hispanics/Latinos may be of any race.
Race / Ethnicity (NH = Non-Hispanic)	Pop 2000	Pop 2010	Pop 2020	% 2000	% 2010	% 2020
White alone (NH)	77	62	55	28.10%	30.10%	35.71%
Black or African American alone (NH)	194	137	87	70.80%	66.50%	56.49%
Native American or Alaska Native alone (NH)	0	0	0	0.00%	0.00%	0.00%
Asian alone (NH)	0	0	0	0.00%	0.00%	0.00%
Native Hawaiian or Pacific Islander alone (NH)	0	0	0	0.00%	0.00%	0.00%
Other race alone (NH)	0	0	0	0.00%	0.00%	0.00%
Mixed race or Multiracial (NH)	3	6	8	1.09%	2.91%	5.19%
Hispanic or Latino (any race)	0	1	4	0.00%	0.49%	2.60%
Total	274	206	154	100.00%	100.00%	100.00%

=== 2000 census ===
As of the census of 2000, there were 274 people, 116 households, and 67 families residing in the village. The population density was 214.9 inhabitants per square mile (83.0/km^{2}). There were 135 housing units at an average density of 105.9 per square mile (40.9/km^{2}). The racial makeup of the village was 28.10% White, 70.80% African American, and 1.09% from two or more races.

There were 116 households, out of which 25.9% had children under the age of 18 living with them, 32.8% were married couples living together, 21.6% had a female householder with no husband present, and 41.4% were non-families. 37.1% of all households were made up of individuals, and 21.6% had someone living alone who was 65 years of age or older. The average household size was 2.36 and the average family size was 3.22.

In the village, the population was spread out, with 29.2% under the age of 18, 7.7% from 18 to 24, 22.6% from 25 to 44, 19.0% from 45 to 64, and 21.5% who were 65 years of age or older. The median age was 38 years. For every 100 females, there were 82.7 males. For every 100 females age 18 and over, there were 67.2 males.

The median income for a household in the village was $16,786, and the median income for a family was $28,250. Males had a median income of $29,444 versus $18,333 for females. The per capita income for the village was $12,946. About 26.5% of families and 32.9% of the population were below the poverty line, including 42.9% of those under the age of eighteen and 29.8% of those 65 or over.
