= Henry N. Barkhausen Cache River Wetlands Center =

Coordinates: 37.311668°N 89.017893°W

Henry N. Barkhausen Cache River Wetlands Center is a nature center and natural history museum in the Cache River Wetlands, near Cypress, Illinois. It features exhibits, an interactive diorama of a wetland, interactive touch screens and a 12-minute video on the cultural and natural history of the watershed, including the Cypress Creek National Wildlife Refuge. The center is managed by the Illinois Department of Natural Resources and jointly operated by the Cache River Wetlands Joint Venture Partnership.

== History ==
The center — completed in November 2004 and opened in 2005 — is named for Henry N. Barkhausen who encouraged government agencies, private organizations and local residents to protect natural character of the Cache River. Barkhausen was the former director of the Illinois Department of Conservation (now Illinois Department of Natural Resources) when the state was establishing its first natural area program, a former trustee of The Nature Conservancy in Illinois and a 19-year member of the Citizens Committee to Save the Cache River, a grassroots effort to promote conservation of the Cache River.

Construction on the $4-million center started in 2000. In 2004, the center opened its doors for community and school programs. In 2005, exhibits were complete and opened to the public two days a week. By November of that same year, the center expanded its hours to the present-day schedule – Wednesday through Sunday, from 9 a.m. to 4 p.m.

== Activities ==
The center provides a variety of programs, special events and school field trips for families, students, organized groups and individuals. Information about hunting, hiking, fishing or watching wildlife also is available.

Student programs feature hands-on activities and presentations that focus on wildlife, the values of wetlands and related resource issues.
