= Perks, Illinois =

- Unincorporated community
- Location within Illinois Location within the United States
- Coordinates: 37°18′35″N 89°04′51″W
- Country: United States
- State: Illinois
- County: Pulaski
- Elevation: 345 ft (105 m)
- Time zone: UTC-6 (Central (CST))
  - Summer (DST): UTC-5 (CDT)
- ZIP code: 62973
- Area code: 618
- GNIS feature ID: 415554

Perks is an unincorporated community in Pulaski County, Illinois, United States. Perks is 7 miles (11 kilometers) northeast of Ullin. Perks had a post office with ZIP code 62973. This post office was discontinued on August 12, 2017. Perks now falls under the 62992 ZIP code of Ullin. Perks was originally known as Stringtown.

The community has one grocery store and gas station. Local attractions include the Cache River State Natural Area. Perks has fewer than 100 people, many of whom are farmers or longtime residents of the community.
