= Belknap, Illinois =

- Village
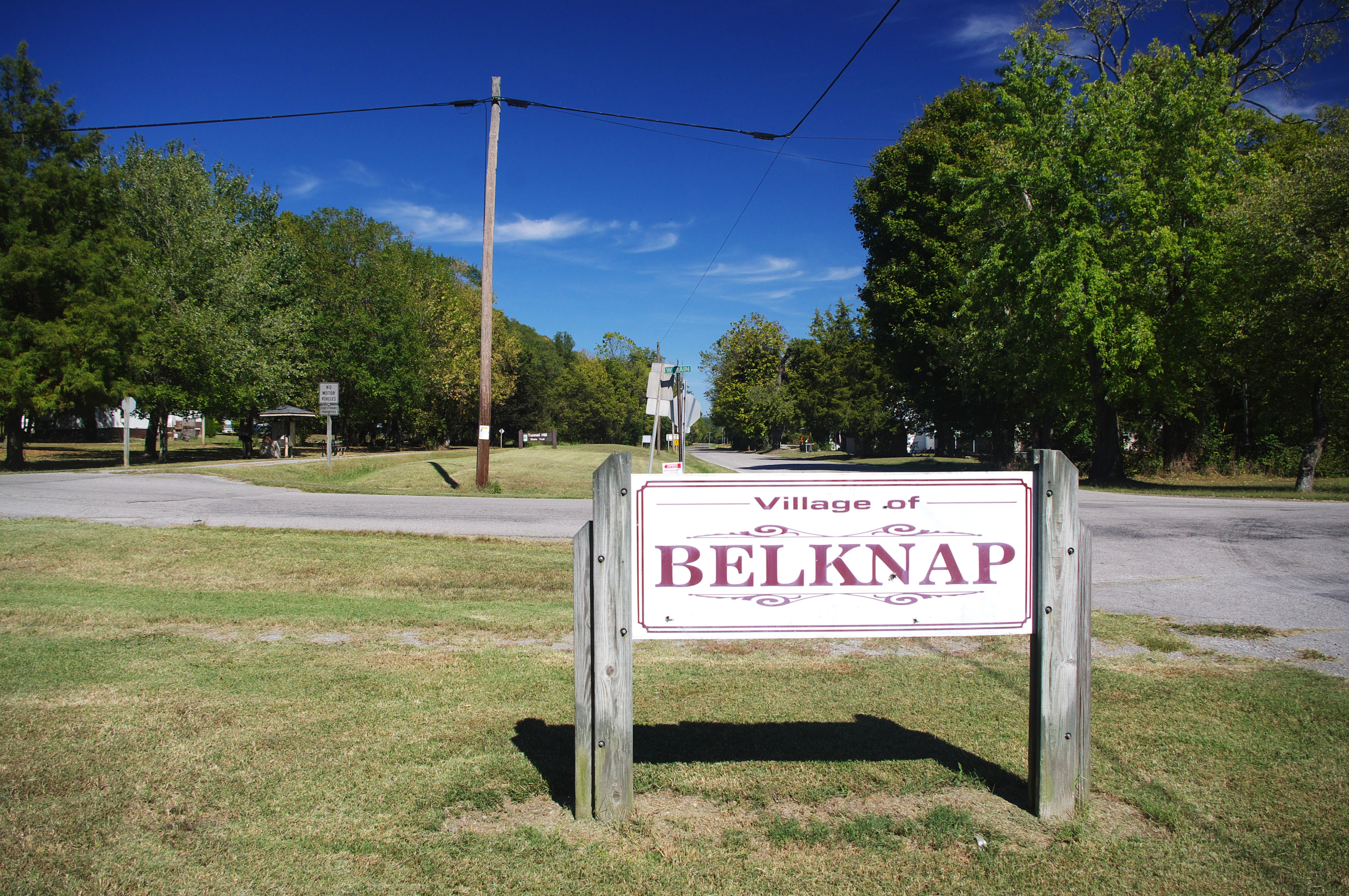
- Welcome sign in Belknap

- Location of Belknap in Johnson County, Illinois
- Coordinates: 37°19′21″N 88°56′26″W
- Country: United States
- State: Illinois
- County: Johnson

Area
  - Total: 1.06 sq mi (2.74 km^{2})
  - Land: 1.06 sq mi (2.74 km^{2})
  - Water: 0.0039 sq mi (0.01 km^{2})
- Elevation: 341 ft (104 m)

Population (2020)
  - Total: 88
  - Density: 83.2/sq mi (32.13/km^{2})
- Time zone: UTC-6 (CST)
  - Summer (DST): UTC-5 (CDT)
- ZIP code: 62908
- Area code: 618
- FIPS code: 17-04715
- GNIS feature ID: 2398072

Belknap is a village in Johnson County, Illinois, United States. The population was 88 at the 2020 census.

== History ==
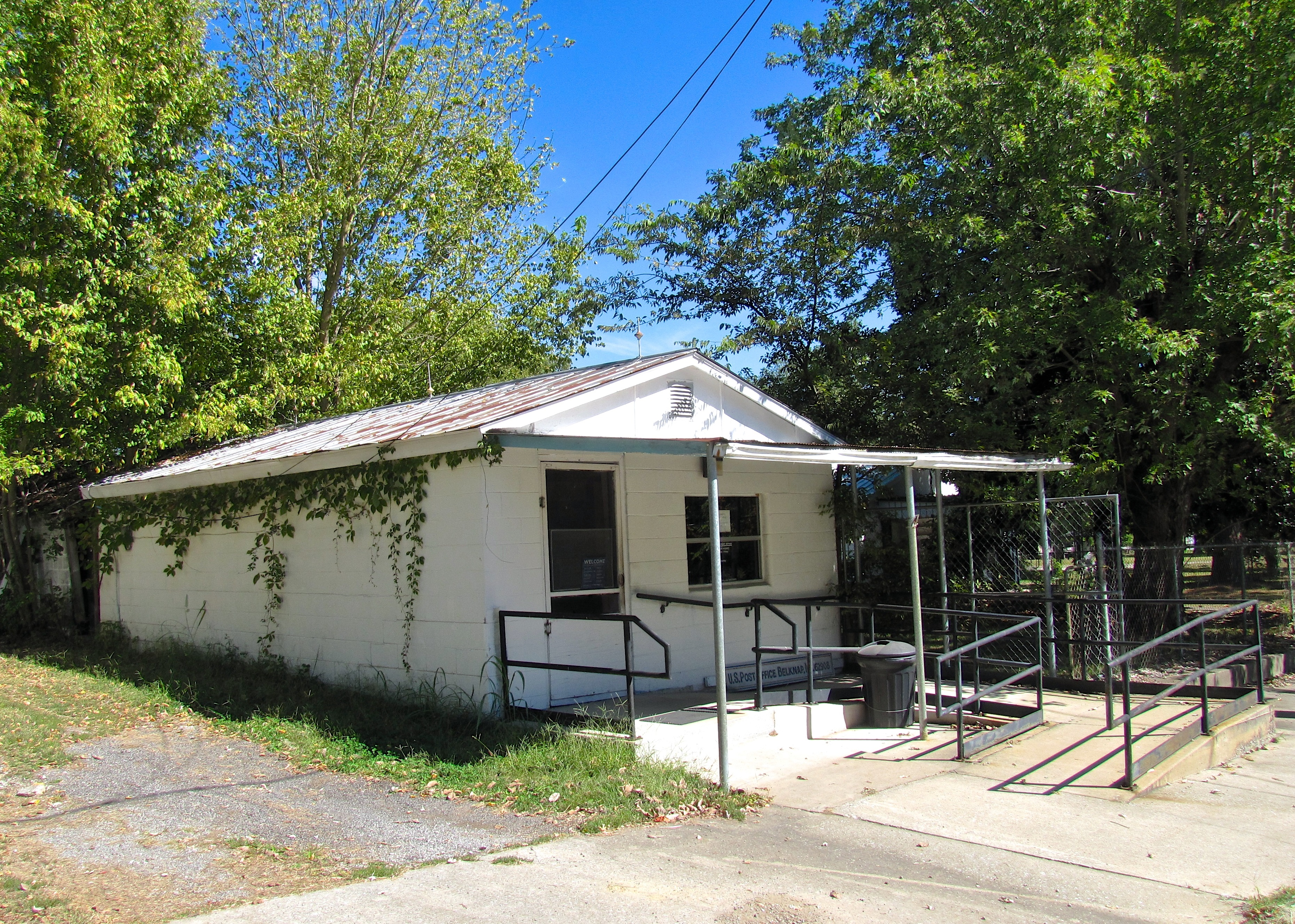
Belknap Post Office, September 2017

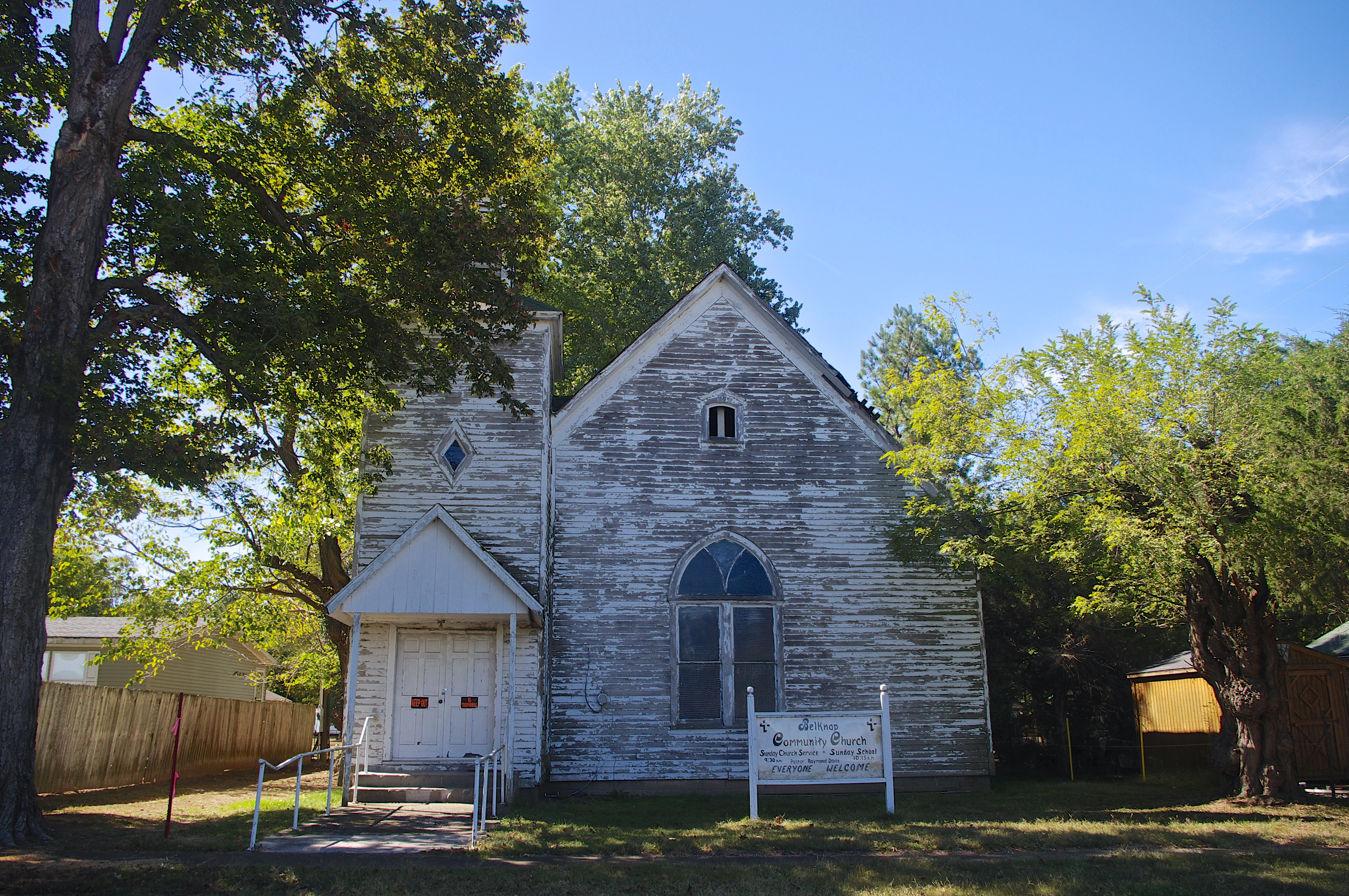
Belknap Community Church, September 2017

Belknap was established 1873 as a stop along what would become the Big Four Railroad. It was likely named for William Worth Belknap, who served as U.S. Secretary of War during this period. A post office was established that same year, and the village incorporated in 1880.

== Geography ==
Belknap is located in southern Johnson County situated in the Cache River basin northeast of Karnak and southwest of Vienna. The Heron Pond – Little Black Slough Nature Preserve lies to the north of Belknap, and the 45-mile (72 km) Tunnel Hill State Trail passes through the village.

According to the 2021 census gazetteer files, Belknap has a total area of 1.06 square miles (2.75 km^{2}), of which 1.06 square miles (2.75 km^{2}) (or 99.81%) is land and 0.00 square miles (0.00 km^{2}) (or 0.19%) is water.

== Demographics ==
Historical population
Census	Pop.	Note	%±
1890	358		—
1900	372		3.9%
1910	404		8.6%
1920	424		5.0%
1930	275		−35.1%
1940	280		1.8%
1950	247		−11.8%
1960	203		−17.8%
1970	193		−4.9%
1980	172		−10.9%
1990	125		−27.3%
2000	133		6.4%
2010	104		−21.8%
2020	88		−15.4%
U.S. Decennial Census

As of the 2020 census there were 88 people, 68 households, and 35 families residing in the village. The population density was 83.10 inhabitants per square mile (32.09/km^{2}). There were 49 housing units at an average density of 46.27 per square mile (17.86/km^{2}). The racial makeup of the village was 95.45% White, 0.00% African American, 0.00% Native American, 0.00% Asian, 0.00% Pacific Islander, 1.14% from other races, and 3.41% from two or more races. Hispanic or Latino of any race were 1.14% of the population.

There were 68 households, out of which 11.8% had children under the age of 18 living with them, 44.12% were married couples living together, 5.88% had a female householder with no husband present, and 48.53% were non-families. 39.71% of all households were made up of individuals, and 19.12% had someone living alone who was 65 years of age or older. The average household size was 3.00 and the average family size was 2.09.

The village's age distribution consisted of 17.6% under the age of 18, 11.3% from 18 to 24, 20.3% from 25 to 44, 38% from 45 to 64, and 12.7% who were 65 years of age or older. The median age was 50.1 years. For every 100 females, there were 43.4 males. For every 100 females age 18 and over, there were 44.4 males.

The median income for a household in the village was $42,500, and the median income for a family was $94,750. Males had a median income of $38,750 versus $26,250 for females. The per capita income for the village was $20,737. About 2.9% of families and 12.0% of the population were below the poverty line, including 4.0% of those under age 18 and 33.3% of those age 65 or over.
