= River piracy =

River piracy may refer to:

- River pirate
- River capture
