= Heron Pond – Little Black Slough Nature Preserve =

Protected wetland in Illinois, US

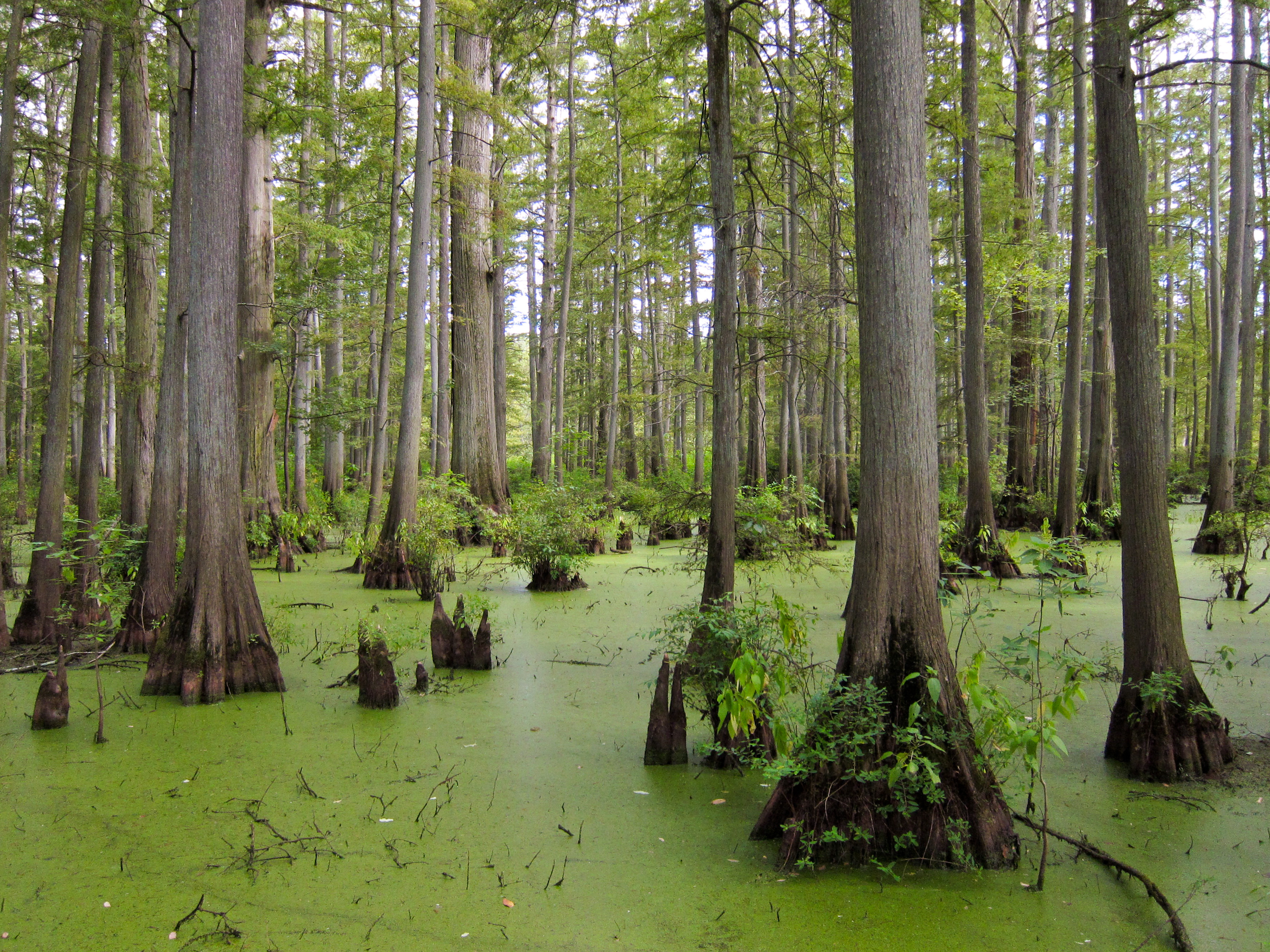
- Heron Pond

- Location within Illinois
- Location: Johnson County, Illinois
- Nearest city: Vienna
- Coordinates: 37.367°N 88.950°W
- Area: 1,861 acres (753 ha)

U.S. National Natural Landmark
- Designated: 1972

Ramsar Wetland
- Official name: Cache River and Cypress Creek Wetlands
- Designated: 1 November 1994
- Reference no.: 711

Heron Pond – Little Black Slough Nature Preserve (also known simply as Heron Pond) is a parcel of protected wetland property located in Belknap, Illinois, approximately 5 miles (8 km) southwest of Vienna, in Johnson County. It was designated a National Natural Landmark in 1972. As part of the Cache River basin, it is classified as a wetland of international importance under the Ramsar Convention.

== Biological history ==
Heron Pond – Little Black Slough Nature Preserve protects a swath of Cache River drainage upstream from the Post Creek Cutoff. Its biology and geology are representative of the Coastal Plain natural division in Illinois, which is the northernmost extent of the Gulf Coastal Plain in North America. It combines upland limestone bluffs (Wildcat Bluff), Cache River floodplain, and a drier mesic woodland (Boss Island).

The wetland sections of this Nature Preserve protect several old growth stands of bald cypress and water tupelo, and a heron rookery. As of 2023, the Illinois state-champion cherrybark oak can be viewed from the Todd Fink-Heron Pond hiking trail.

The name of the Wildcat Bluff upland may commemorate one of the nature preserve's top carnivores, the bobcat. River otters can also be found at Heron Pond. Birdwatchers visit Heron Pond – Little Black Slough to search for a variety of raptors, including the black vulture, red-shouldered hawk, and the barred owl, and enjoy a variety of songbirds, including the Kentucky warbler and the yellow-throated warbler.

== Today ==
The Heron Pond – Little Black Slough Nature Preserve complex comprises 1,861 acres (753 hectares) of land accessible from U.S. Highway 45. In terms of area, it is the largest natural area owned and operated by the Illinois Department of Natural Resources.

A floating boardwalk that is part of the Todd Fink-Heron Pond Trail allows visitors to enter the bald cypress/water tupelo swamp.

The name of the small nearby town of Cypress, Illinois, appears to commemorate the cypress trees of the upper Cache River drainage, including the groves now protected within the Heron Pond – Little Black Slough Nature Preserve.
