= Diamond Island (Kentucky) =

Uninhibited island in Henderson County, Kentucky

- Interactive map of Diamond Island

Geography
- Location: Ohio River, Henderson County, Kentucky, United States
- Coordinates: 37.9°N 87.8°W
- Area: 0.5 sq mi (1.3 km^{2})
- Highest elevation: 360 ft (110 m)

Administration
- United States
- State: Kentucky
- County: Henderson

Demographics
- Population: 0 (2000)

Location of Diamond Island is in Henderson County, Kentucky

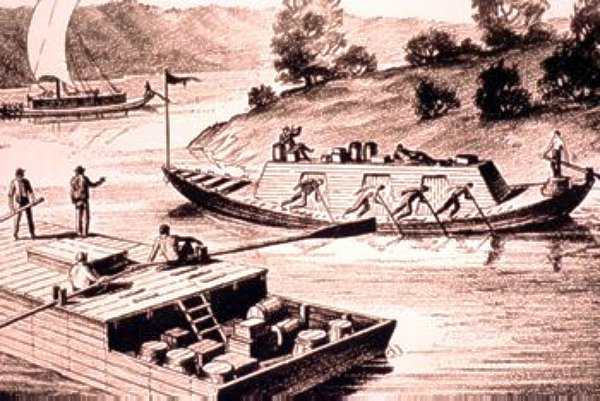
River pirates at Diamond Island preyed on the Ohio River flatboats, keelboats, and rafts, as profitable targets of goods, attacking the crews and pioneers who were easily overwhelmed and killed.

Diamond Island is an island in the Ohio River ten miles west of Henderson in Henderson County, Kentucky, United States. It has an area of about half a square mile. The island had no population as of the 2000 census.

== History ==
=== River piracy ===
In the late eighteenth century, it was a hideout for river pirates, most notably Samuel Mason and his gang in 1797 and the serial killers, the Harpe Brothers.

=== Diamond Island Massacre ===
In 1803, the Barnard family was emigrating from Virginia when one son, James, shot a deer on the bank. The family landed the boat to retrieve the deer and were ambushed by ten Native Americans, who were hiding in the canebrake. The first to board the boat was killed by Mrs. Barnard with an axe. Mr. Barnard shot and killed two before he was killed. The son, James, ran away with a corn knife, pursued by two. When one fell behind, James turned to fight and the last pursuer fled.

When James returned to the boat, his mother and father lay dead, and his two younger brothers and one sister were missing. What became of the three children was never known.
