= Spencer Heights, Illinois =

- Unincorporated community
- Location within Illinois Location within the United States
- Coordinates: 37°07′38″N 89°11′41″W
- Country: United States
- State: Illinois
- County: Pulaski
- Elevation: 423 ft (129 m)
- Time zone: UTC-6 (Central (CST))
  - Summer (DST): UTC-5 (CDT)
- Area code: 618
- GNIS feature ID: 418894

Spencer Heights is an unincorporated community in Pulaski County, Illinois, United States. Spencer Heights is 1 mile (1.6 km) north of Mounds. It has a zip code of 62964 and a population of 1,386 (2015 data).
