= Wetaug, Illinois =

- Unincorporated community
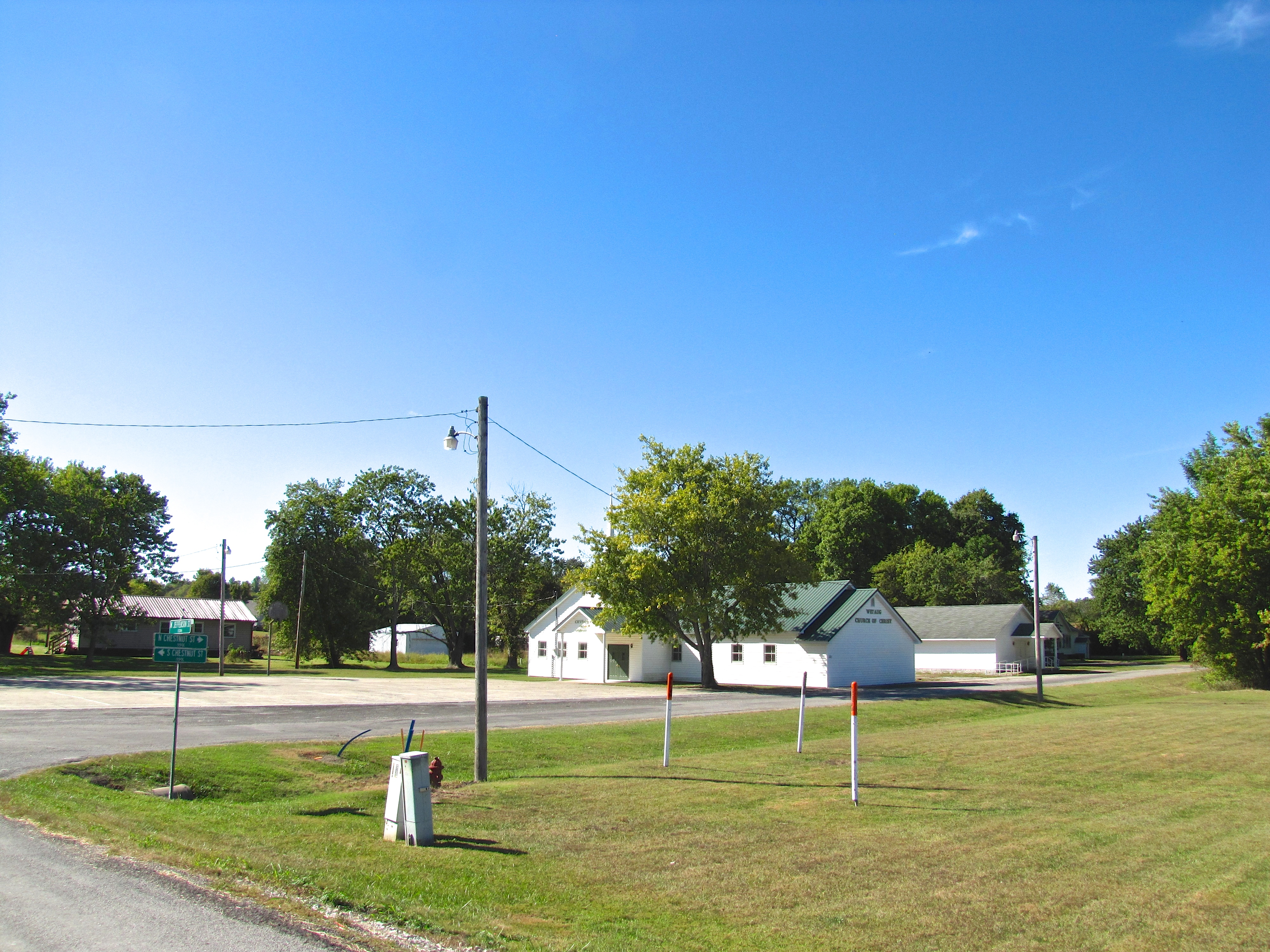
- Wetaug

- Location within Illinois Location within the United States
- Coordinates: 37°19′26″N 89°10′00″W
- Country: United States
- State: Illinois
- County: Pulaski
- Elevation: 358 ft (109 m)
- Time zone: UTC-6 (Central (CST))
  - Summer (DST): UTC-5 (CDT)
- Area code: 618
- GNIS feature ID: 420979

Wetaug is an unincorporated community in Pulaski County, Illinois, United States. Wetaug is located along Old U.S. Highway 51 south of Dongola and north of Ullin. The community, established in the mid-1850s as a stop along the Illinois Central Railroad, was named for Weatogue, Connecticut, though local folklore long suggested it had been named for a Cherokee chief who had died in the area during the Trail of Tears march in the late 1830s.
