= Cantonment Wilkinson Site =

Coordinates: 37°14′05″N 88°57′16″W

Cantonment Wilkinson is located on the banks of the Ohio River in present-day Pulaski County, Illinois. Cantonment Wilkinson served as a short-term U.S. Army camp established on New Year's day 1801. Occupied for approximately 18 months, from 1801 to 1802, the camp housed over 1,000 soldiers and their dependents. At its peak, Cantonment Wilkinson was among the largest military installations in the country, accommodating more than 1,500 soldiers before its abandonment in 1802. Following the U.S. Army's departure, the site was subsequently occupied by Cherokee Indians and Euro-American squatters.

Cantonment Wilkinson was excavated by SIUC archaeologists in 2003-2005 where they recovered a large artifact assemblage associated with the U.S. frontier army. Artifacts recovered ranged from military uniform buttons, ceramics, glassware, and more. The assemblage provided insightful information on the U.S. Army during the transitional period between the American Revolution and War of 1812.

A historical marker is located three miles north of the site in Grand Chain, Illinois.

== Historical background ==
The establishment of the Cantonment Wilkinson base was ordered in September 1800 as a safety measure against resuming hostilities with France. Hostilities between France the United States began in 1797 with the XYZ Affair which exposed French diplomats for demanding bribes from American officials. This led to a strained relationship between France and the United States causing the American government to prepare for war. This resulted in the desire to build a base that would allow soldiers to train at a single base before battle.

== Archaeological investigations ==
The site was discovered in 2003 by a team at SIU in Pulaski County. Subsequently, the SIU team plowed the field of the site which revealed a 37,000 square meter of brick buildings along with ceramic, glass, metal, and other artifacts. Hand excavation revealed the discovery of early nineteenth-century military uniform buttons, ceramics, glassware, and other artifacts at the site. Later on in 2004, IHPA provided additional funding that resulted in the excavation of 27 more test units. Further investigation and excavation yielded in items such as charred wood, ceramic dish and bowl fragments, glass bottles, uniform buttons, and other military items. Features discovered includes a possible pit cellar that was located under a hut, two large and deep cellars, a small hearth, and trash pits. An additional 21 testing units were excavated before investigations concluded in 2005 due to the similarity of artifacts recovered in earlier investigations which did not produce any additional historical insights.

== Significance and analysis ==
The discovery and analysis of the personal artifacts discovered at this site provided more information on its history. The large number of buttons discovered suggests that these metal buttons were a part of the military uniforms. The discovery of silver-plated and gold-plated buttons provided insights in the rankings of the officers that once inhabited the base. The discovery of the site also provided new information on the history of that site as well as providing evidence of previous information.
