= Cache River State Natural Area =

State park in Illinois, USA

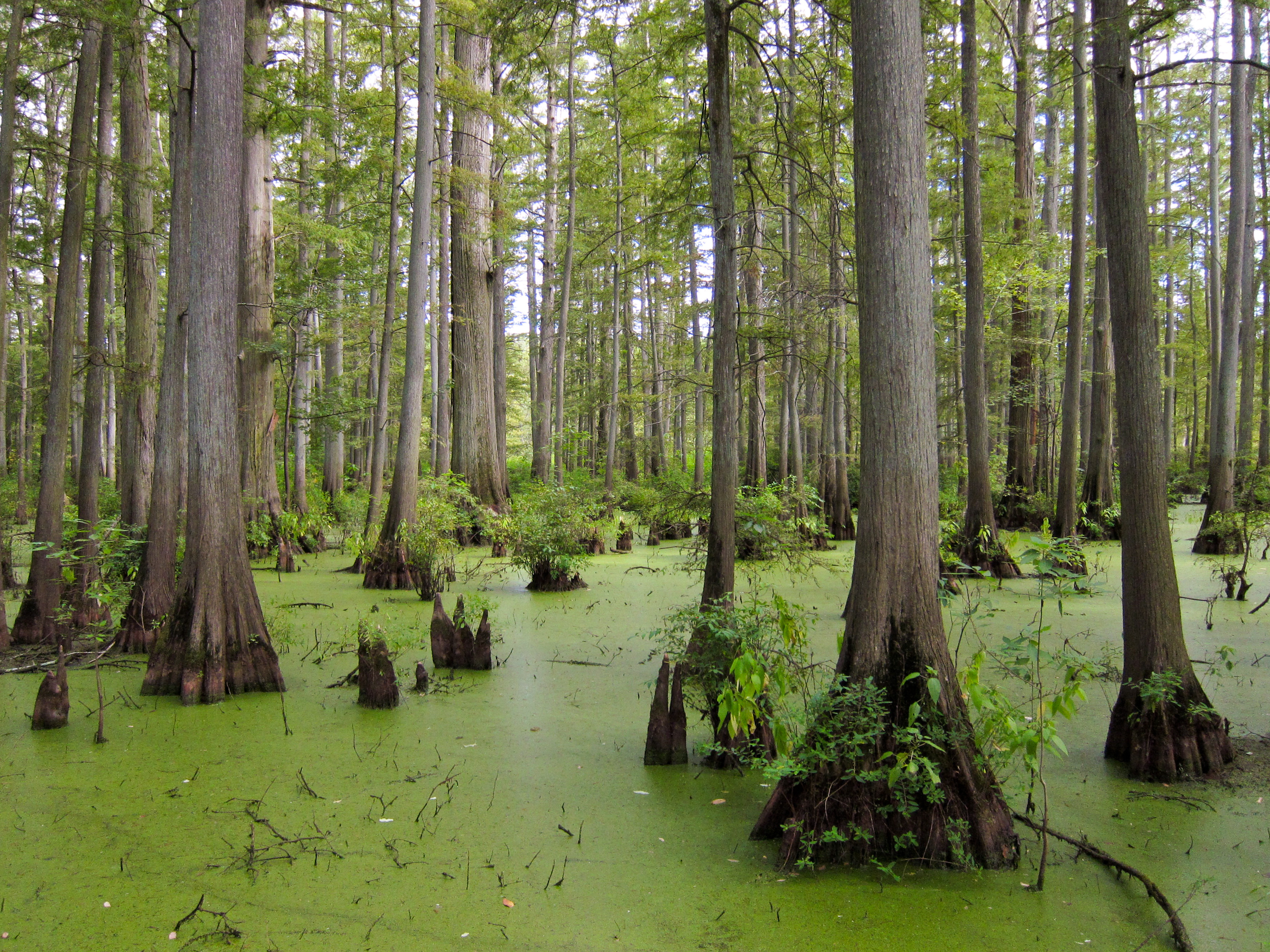
- Taxodium distichum in Heron Pond

- Location within Illinois Location within the United States
- Location: Johnson County, Illinois, USA
- Nearest city: Belknap, Illinois
- Coordinates: 37°21′44″N 88°57′20″W
- Area: 14,314 acres (5,793 ha)
- Established: 1970
- Governing body: Illinois Department of Natural Resources

Cache River State Natural Area is an Illinois state park centered on the Cache River (Illinois) of 14,314 acres (5,793 ha) in Johnson County, Illinois, United States.
