= Pulaski County Courthouse (Illinois) =

Local government building in the United States

Coordinates: 37°5′23″N 89°9′44″W

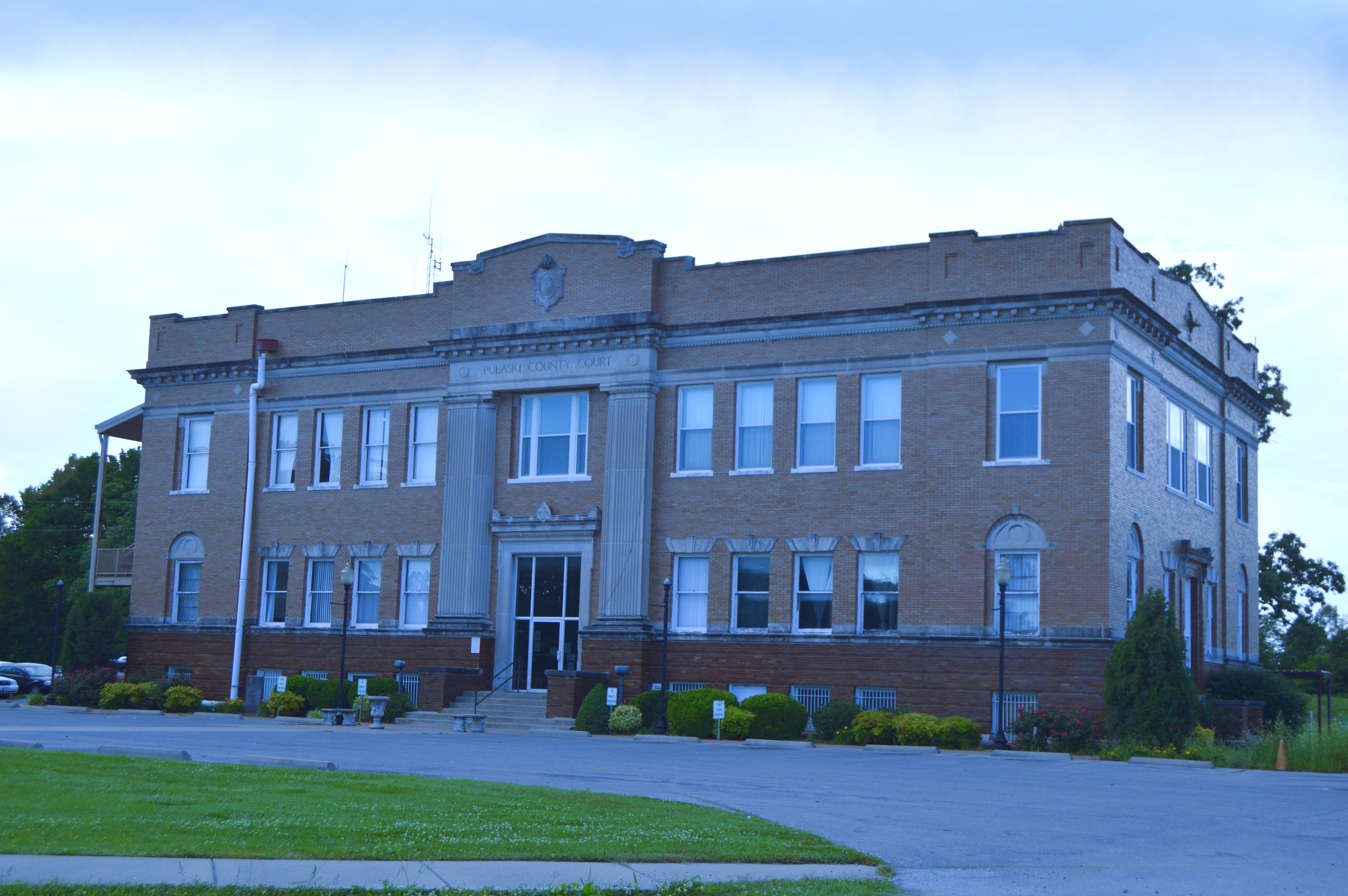
Front and eastern side of the courthouse

The Pulaski County Courthouse is a government building in Mound City, the county seat of Pulaski County, Illinois, United States. Built in 1912 and damaged by the Great Flood of 1937, it remains in use as the county's courthouse.

== History ==
The first residents of Pulaski County, aside from soldiers on station, were a few families who settled along the Ohio River prior to 1810. Settlement was retarded by the War of 1812, during which Indians friendly with the British murdered a group of settlers at the later site of Mound City. At the war's outbreak, the land now part of Pulaski County was included within the bounds of Johnson County; parts were included in Union County and later Alexander County until Pulaski County was formed in 1843 from sections of Alexander and Johnson counties. The town of America, now within the boundaries of Pulaski County, served as the Alexander County seat from 1819 to 1837.

When Pulaski County was formed, Caledonia was designated the county seat, but four years passed before a courthouse could be erected. During this period, controversy arose over the practice of public officials merely carrying around the papers appertaining to their offices, prompting the General Assembly to enact a legal guarantee for these officials' actions. Meanwhile, as railroad construction approached the area, a riverside landowner decided to plat a town in the southern part of the county in 1854, and a Cincinnati company platted another town nearby in the following year; these two locations, Mound City and Emporium City, merged under the former name in 1857. Mound City's location kept it busy during the Civil War, as a Union Navy base for gunboat maintenance was built on the shoreline and a large naval hospital operated in a former warehouse. In 1865, even before the military bases had been decommissioned, the General Assembly voted to allow Pulaski County residents a plebiscite on the location of the county seat; the vote was held in 1866, and following a two-year court battle that nearly culminated in a county seat war, the result was finally decided in favor of Mound City in 1868.

== Current courthouse ==
Constructed in 1912, the current Pulaski County Courthouse is a two-story brick building with a belt course topping its five-section facade: a one-window section with slight battlements sits at either end, a post and lintel with Doric capitals frames the central entrance and one second-story window, and four windows pierce each floor of the intermediate sections. The interior was constructed to provide space for county officials on the first story and courtrooms, plus some smaller offices, on the second. Originally located west of the courthouse was a jail built as part of the same construction project.

Although Mound City's first settlers believed that their new community was high enough to stand above the worst floods, they were quickly proven wrong and forced to build levees to protect the city. These structures were improved following periodic floods, but nothing could hold back the Great Flood of 1937, which was far higher than had ever before been seen on the Ohio River; every part of Mound City was submerged, the shallowest point seeing 12 feet (3.7 m) of water and the deepest 20 feet (6.1 m). Every building in the city was damaged, and waters reached the courthouse's second story, but it was capable of repair. Remodelled in 1964 and deemed in excellent condition by a later Illinois Historic Preservation Agency survey, it remains in use by the county government.
