= Mound City, Illinois =

- City
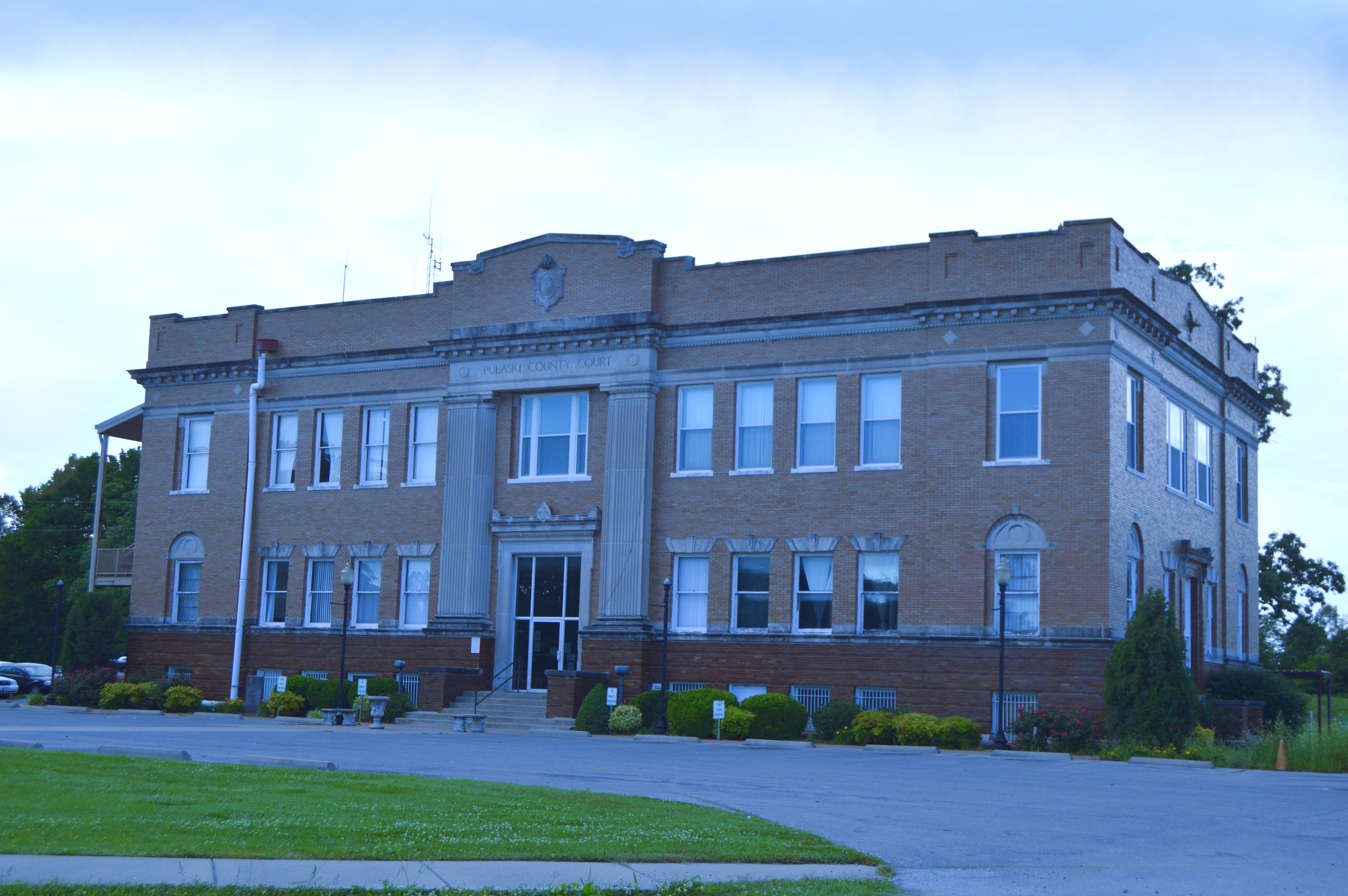
- Pulaski County Courthouse
- Interactive map of Mound City, Illinois
- Location within Illinois Location within the United States
- Coordinates: 37°5′8″N 89°9′47″W
- Country: United States
- State: Illinois
- County: Pulaski

Government
  - Mayor: Allison Madison

Area
  - Total: 0.74 sq mi (1.91 km^{2})
  - Land: 0.68 sq mi (1.75 km^{2})
  - Water: 0.062 sq mi (0.16 km^{2})
- Elevation: 322 ft (98 m)

Population (2020)
  - Total: 526
  - Density: 778.9/sq mi (300.75/km^{2})
- Time zone: UTC-6 (CST)
  - Summer (DST): UTC-5 (CDT)
- ZIP Code(s): 62963
- Area code: 618
- FIPS code: 17-50751
- GNIS feature ID: 2395112
- Wikimedia Commons: Mound City, Illinois

Mound City is a city in and the county seat of Pulaski County, Illinois, United States. It is located along the Ohio River just north of its confluence with the Mississippi River. As of the 2020 census, Mound City had a population of 526. It has a majority African American population and was home to Lovejoy High School (ca. 1909-1961), named for abolitionist Elijah P. Lovejoy, that served African American students. Students were integrated into Mound City Community High School in 1962 and after 1968 at Meridian High School served the community. Pirates were the mascot of Lovejoy and purple and gold the school colors.

== History ==
Mound City was incorporated in 1857 as a union of two cities: Mound City, founded by Major General Moses Marshal Rawlings, and Emporium City, a project of the Emporium Real Estate and Manufacturing Company, a group of Cincinnati and Cairo businessmen. The city took its name from a Native American mound on which guests at General Rawlings' hotel would sleep in summer, as the breezes cooled them and dispersed the mosquitoes.

During the Civil War, Admiral Andrew Hull Foote made Cairo the naval station for the Mississippi River Squadron of over 200 ironclads, timberclads, hospital ships, transports, and other vessels. Since Cairo had no land available for base facilities, the navy yard repair shop machinery was afloat aboard wharf-boats, old steamers, tugs, flat-boats, and rafts. The naval station was moved upstream in 1862 when 10 acres (4.0 ha) of land was purchased in Mound City. The Mound City Naval Station included a shipyard with marine ways, a foundry, marine barracks, supply offices, and a hospital; but many repair facilities remained afloat because the Mound City land was frequently inundated by flood waters.

USS Cairo was built in 1861 by James Eads and Co. of Mound City, under contract to the War Department. She was commissioned in January 1862 as part of the Mississippi River Squadron, U.S. Navy Lieutenant James M. Prichett in command. She was a City-class ironclad gunboat constructed for the Union Navy during the American Civil War. She was the lead ship of the City-class gunboats, sometimes also called the Cairo class, and was named for Cairo, Illinois. On December 12, 1862, just north of Vicksburg, Mississippi, the USS Cairo became the first ship sunk by electrically detonated torpedoes during its mission to destroy Confederate batteries and clear the Yazoo River of underwater mines.

In 2017, Mound City elected Allison Madison, the city's first African-American and first female mayor.

== Geography ==
Mound City is located at 37°5′8″N 89°9′47″W (37.085624, -89.163054).

According to the 2010 census, Mound City has a total area of 0.729 square miles (1.89 km^{2}), of which 0.67 square miles (1.74 km^{2}) (or 91.91%) is land and 0.059 square miles (0.15 km^{2}) (or 8.09%) is water.

The majority of the Native American mounds for which the city was named have been destroyed by development and farming.

== Demographics ==
Historical population
Census	Pop.	Note	%±
1860	898		—
1870	1,631		81.6%
1900	2,705		—
1910	2,837		4.9%
1920	2,756		−2.9%
1930	2,548		−7.5%
1940	2,465		−3.3%
1950	2,167		−12.1%
1960	1,669		−23.0%
1970	1,177		−29.5%
1980	1,102		−6.4%
1990	765		−30.6%
2000	692		−9.5%
2010	588		−15.0%
2020	526		−10.5%
U.S. Decennial Census

=== Racial and ethnic composition ===
Mound City city, Illinois – Racial and ethnic composition Note: the US Census treats Hispanic/Latino as an ethnic category. This table excludes Latinos from the racial categories and assigns them to a separate category. Hispanics/Latinos may be of any race.
Race / Ethnicity (NH = Non-Hispanic)	Pop 2000	Pop 2010	Pop 2020	% 2000	% 2010	% 2020
White alone (NH)	343	256	193	49.57%	43.54%	36.69%
Black or African American alone (NH)	336	314	295	48.55%	53.40%	56.08%
Native American or Alaska Native alone (NH)	0	1	2	0.00%	0.17%	0.38%
Asian alone (NH)	1	1	0	0.14%	0.17%	0.00%
Native Hawaiian or Pacific Islander alone (NH)	0	0	0	0.00%	0.00%	0.00%
Other race alone (NH)	0	2	6	0.00%	0.34%	1.14%
Mixed race or Multiracial (NH)	4	5	26	0.58%	0.85%	4.94%
Hispanic or Latino (any race)	8	9	4	1.16%	1.53%	0.76%
Total	692	588	526	100.00%	100.00%	100.00%

=== 2010 census ===
As of the census of 2010, there were 588 people and 270 households. The racial makeup of the city was 44.39% White, 53.4% African American, a single Asian, three individuals from other races, and eight individuals from two or more races. There were nine people who were Hispanic or Latino of any race.

=== 2000 census ===
As of the census of 2000, there were 692 people, 279 households, and 178 families residing in the city. The population density was 973.5 inhabitants per square mile (375.9/km^{2}). There were 319 housing units at an average density of 448.8 per square mile (173.3/km^{2}). The racial makeup of the city was 49.57% White, 49.57% African American, 0.14% Asian, 0.14% from other races, and 0.58% from two or more races. Hispanic or Latino people of any race were 1.16% of the population.

There were 279 households, out of which 40.1% had children under the age of 18 living with them, 30.5% were married couples living together, 30.5% had a female householder with no husband present, and 36.2% were non-families. 31.2% of all households were made up of individuals, and 13.6% had someone living alone who was 65 years of age or older. The average household size was 2.48 and the average family size was 3.12.

In the city, the population was spread out, with 32.5% under the age of 18, 11.0% from 18 to 24, 26.9% from 25 to 44, 17.8% from 45 to 64, and 11.8% who were 65 years of age or older. The median age was 30 years. For every 100 females, there were 71.7 males. For every 100 females age 18 and over, there were 65.0 males.

The median income for a household in the city was $16,607, and the median income for a family was $22,143. Males had a median income of $35,469 versus $15,583 for females. The per capita income for the city was $10,020. About 35.5% of families and 39.3% of the population were below the poverty line, including 47.5% of those under age 18 and 26.0% of those age 65 or over.

== Notable people ==
- Charlie Hoover, catcher for the Kansas City Cowboys
- Katherine D. Tillman, writer

== National Register of Historic Places ==
- Mound City Civil War Naval Hospital
- Mound City National Cemetery

== See also ==
- List of cities and towns along the Ohio River
- Twin Mounds Site
