= Olmsted, Illinois =

Olmsted
- Village
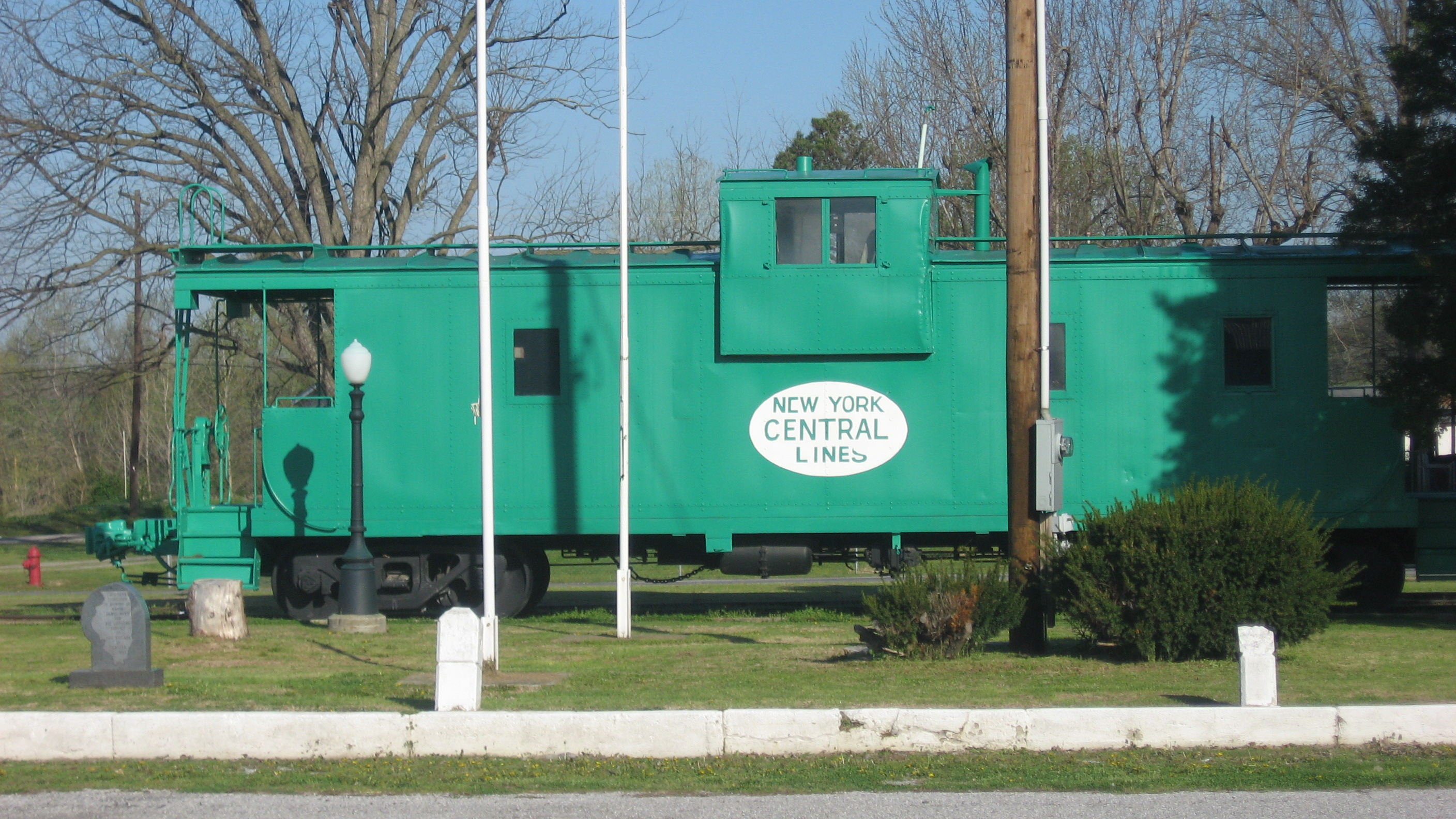
- Caboose at Olmstead Depot
- Nickname: Gateway to the Chestnut Hills
- Location of Olmsted in Pulaski County, Illinois.

- Location of Illinois in the United States
- Coordinates: 37°10′51″N 89°5′11″W
- Country: United States
- State: Illinois
- County: Pulaski

Area
  - Total: 3.49 sq mi (9.05 km^{2})
  - Land: 3.36 sq mi (8.71 km^{2})
  - Water: 0.13 sq mi (0.34 km^{2})
- Elevation: 381 ft (116 m)

Population (2020)
  - Total: 285
  - Density: 85/sq mi (32.7/km^{2})
- Time zone: UTC-6 (CST)
  - Summer (DST): UTC-5 (CDT)
- ZIP Code(s): 62970
- Area code: 618
- FIPS code: 17-55899
- GNIS feature ID: 2399571
- Wikimedia Commons: Olmsted, Illinois
- Website: villageofolmsted.com

Olmsted is a village in Pulaski County, Illinois, along the Ohio River. As of the 2020 census, Olmsted had a population of 285.

== Geography ==
Olmsted is located at 37°10′51″N 89°5′11″W (37.180733, -89.086431).

According to the 2010 census, Olmsted has a total area of 3.496 square miles (9.05 km^{2}), of which 3.37 square miles (8.73 km^{2}) (or 96.4%) is land and 0.126 square miles (0.33 km^{2}) (or 3.6%) is water.

The village is notably between two inter-state large cities of Cape Girardeau, Missouri and Paducah, Kentucky. Ironically, the population clusters of the Cape Girardeau-Paducah-Harrisburg-Union City, MO-KY-IL-TN designated TV market -quad state- area, center in every cardinal extreme away from Olmsted despite its central location.

== Demographics ==
Historical population
Census	Pop.	Note	%±
1880	57		—
1890	203		256.1%
1900	268		32.0%
1910	288		7.5%
1920	318		10.4%
1930	560		76.1%
1940	592		5.7%
1950	525		−11.3%
1960	475		−9.5%
1970	453		−4.6%
1980	439		−3.1%
1990	358		−18.5%
2000	299		−16.5%
2010	333		11.4%
2020	285		−14.4%
U.S. Decennial Census

As of the census of 2000, there were 333 people, 139 households, and 85 families residing in the village. The population density was 178.0 inhabitants per square mile (68.7/km^{2}). There were 173 housing units at an average density of 103.0 per square mile (39.8/km^{2}). The racial makeup of the village was 80.94% White, 18.06% African American, 0.33% Native American, 0.67% from other races. Hispanic or Latino of any race were 0.67% of the population.

There were 139 households, out of which 23.7% had children under the age of 18 living with them, 47.5% were married couples living together, 11.5% had a female householder with no husband present, and 38.8% were non-families. 36.7% of all households were made up of individuals, and 20.1% had someone living alone who was 65 years of age or older. The average household size was 2.15 and the average family size was 2.79.

In the village, the population was spread out, with 21.4% under the age of 18, 7.0% from 18 to 24, 24.4% from 25 to 44, 26.4% from 45 to 64, and 20.7% who were 65 years of age or older. The median age was 43 years. For every 100 females, there were 76.9 males. For every 100 females age 18 and over, there were 80.8 males.

The median income for a household in the village was $19,833, and the median income for a family was $32,188. Males had a median income of $26,875 versus $23,750 for females. The per capita income for the village was $13,615. About 16.9% of families and 21.7% of the population were below the poverty line, including 32.8% of those under the age of eighteen and 16.9% of those 65 or over.

== See also ==
- List of cities and towns along the Ohio River
