= Fort Massac =

Archaeological site in Illinois, United States

Fort Massac State Park
- IUCN category V (protected landscape/seascape)
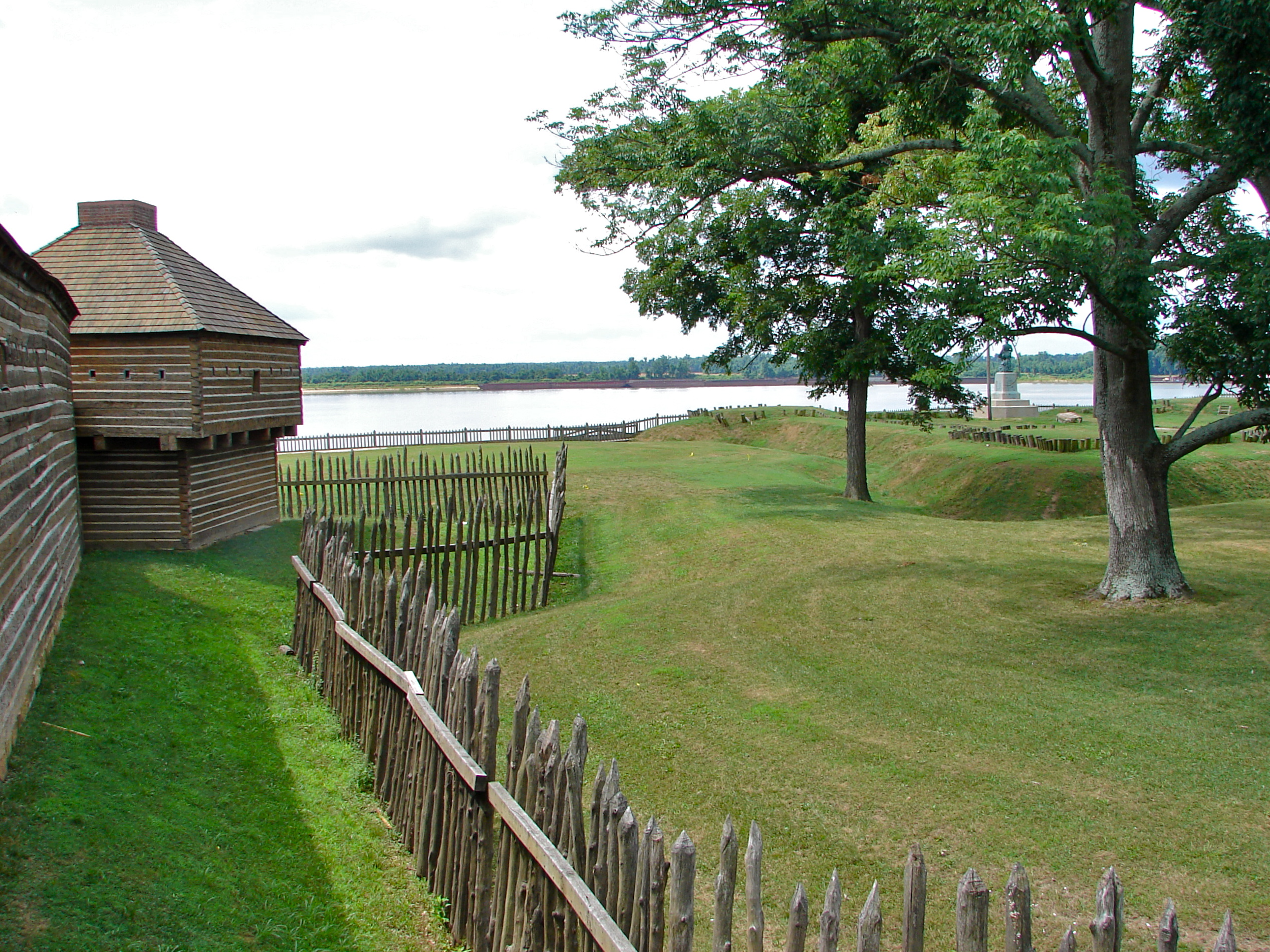
- The 2002 reconstruction of the 1802 Fort Massac, with the Ohio River in the background. The original, 1757 French fort foundation impression, can be seen at center-right, beyond the trees.
- Interactive map of Fort Massac State Park
- Location: Massac County, Illinois
- Nearest city: Metropolis, Illinois
- Coordinates: 37°08′38″N 88°41′14″W
- Area: 1,450 acres (587 ha)
- Established: 1908
- Governing body: Illinois Department of Natural Resources
- Fort Massac Site
- U.S. National Register of Historic Places
- Location within Illinois Location within the United States
- Nearest city: Metropolis, Illinois
- Built: 1757
- NRHP reference No.: 71000293
- Added to NRHP: July 14, 1971

Fort Massac (or Fort Massiac) is a French colonial (Illinois Country) and early National-era fort on the Ohio River in Massac County, Illinois, United States.

Its site was listed on the National Register of Historic Places in 1971.

== History ==
The Spanish explorer Hernando de Soto and his soldiers may have built a fort nearby as early as 1540. Maps from the early 18th century show an "Ancien Fort" ("Old Fort") near this location.

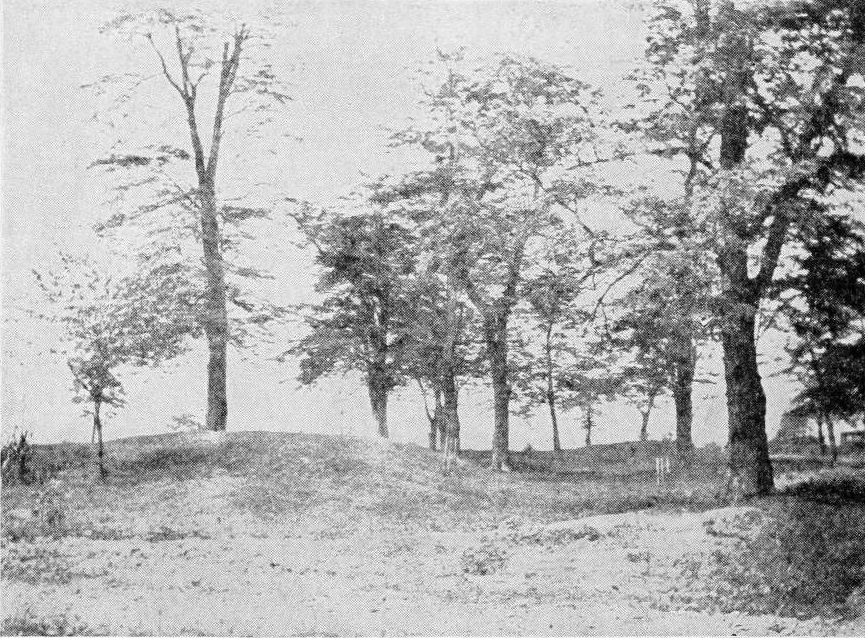
Fort Massac foundation impression, photograph pre-1920.

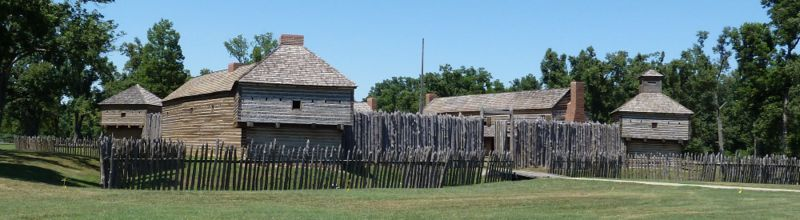
The reconstructed Fort Massac facing the Ohio River shoreline in 2010

Fort Massac was built by the French in 1757, during the French and Indian War and was originally called "Fort de L’Ascension". The name was changed in 1759, to honor of Claud Louis d'Espinchal, Marquis de Massiac, the French Naval Minister. Massiac is a French town in the Cantal department.

The French left the fort at the conclusion of the war, and it was destroyed by the Chickasaw sometime after 1763. In 1778, during the American Revolutionary War, Colonel George Rogers Clark led his regiment of "Long Knives" into Illinois near the site of the fort at Massac Creek. (Note: Clark eventually captured the Illinois area for the State of Virginia.) The fort was rebuilt in 1794, during the Northwest Indian War.

In the fall of 1803, the Lewis and Clark Expedition stopped at Fort Massac on its way west, recruiting two volunteers.

In 1805, General James Wilkinson and Vice President Aaron Burr held discussions at the fort. It is unclear, what connection this meeting may have had to the unfolding Burr Conspiracy (1806–1807), but as an important river fort in what was then the western United States, the fort was connected to several events related to the conspiracy.

The Fort was repaired after being damaged in the 1811–12 New Madrid earthquakes, but it was decommissioned in 1814.

== State park and historic site ==
The Fort Massac site became the first Illinois state park in 1908. In the 1970s, a partial reconstruction of the 1794 U.S. Army fort was built, but in 2002, it was torn down, and a smaller but more detailed version fort as it appeared in 1802 was reconstructed.

Each fall, reenactors gather for the Fort Massac Encampment, which interprets life in the 18th century. A visitor center just north of the reconstruction includes a museum with Indian artifacts, mannequins in period clothing, and other exhibits that explain the history of the fort. (Note: A scale model, built and donated by Mike Gaia of Paducah, KY, is displayed in the museum.)
