= Cypress Creek National Wildlife Refuge =

American wildlife refuge

- IUCN category IV (habitat/species management area)
- Location within the United States
- Location: Alexander County, Johnson County, Pulaski County, Union County, Illinois, United States
- Nearest city: Cypress, Illinois
- Coordinates: 37°21′54″N 89°01′03″W
- Area: 16,000 acres (65 km^{2})
- Established: 1990
- Governing body: U.S. Fish and Wildlife Service
- Website: Cypress Creek National Wildlife Refuge

Ramsar Wetland
- Official name: Cache River and Cypress Creek Wetlands
- Designated: November 1, 1994
- Reference no.: 711

The Cypress Creek National Wildlife Refuge is an American wildlife refuge. It is located in the Cache River watershed in southernmost Illinois, largely in Pulaski County, but with extensions into Union, Alexander, and Johnson counties. The refuge was established in 1990 under the authority of the Emergency Wetlands Resources Act of 1986. The refuge protects over 16,000 acres (65 km^{2}) of the Cache River wetlands, and has a purchase boundary (ultimate goal for area protection) of 36,000 acres (146 km²) contiguous.

== Features ==
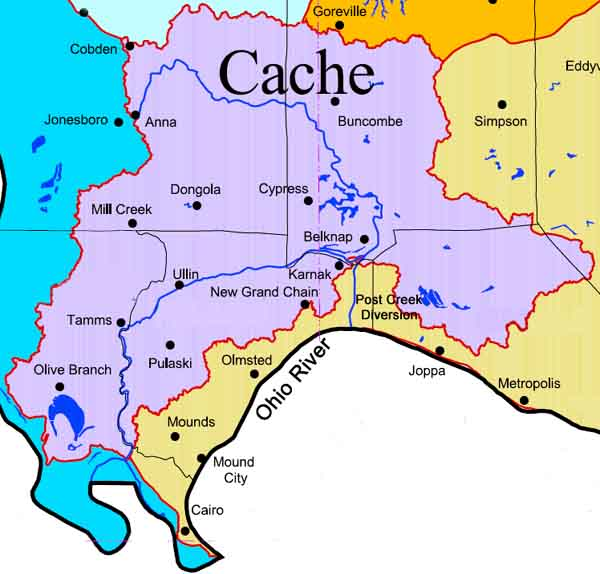
The watershed of the Cache River, in which the Cypress Creek National Wildlife Refuge is located

The Refuge's area covers a variety of habitats, including cypress-tupelo swamp, bottomland forest, upland hardwood forests, oak barrens, and prairie grassland. Over 50 threatened and endangered species are found within the refuge's boundaries. In addition, several pre-Mississippian archaeological sites can be found in the refuge. Cypress Creek is a popular area for both waterfowl and upland game hunters. Hunting of geese, ducks, whitetail deer, rabbits, squirrels, quail and doves is permitted on most parts of the refuge. Fishing on the Cache is generally mediocre; game fish habitat has been significantly degraded by siltation, invasive species (most notably Asian carp), and changes to the natural hydrograph.

== Management ==
Although administered by the United States Fish and Wildlife Service, the Refuge is part of the Cache River Wetlands Joint Venture Partnership, a confederation of state and federal agencies, non-profit groups, and private landowners with the common goal of preservation and restoration of the Cache River.
