= Mound City Civil War Naval Hospital =

- U.S. National Register of Historic Places
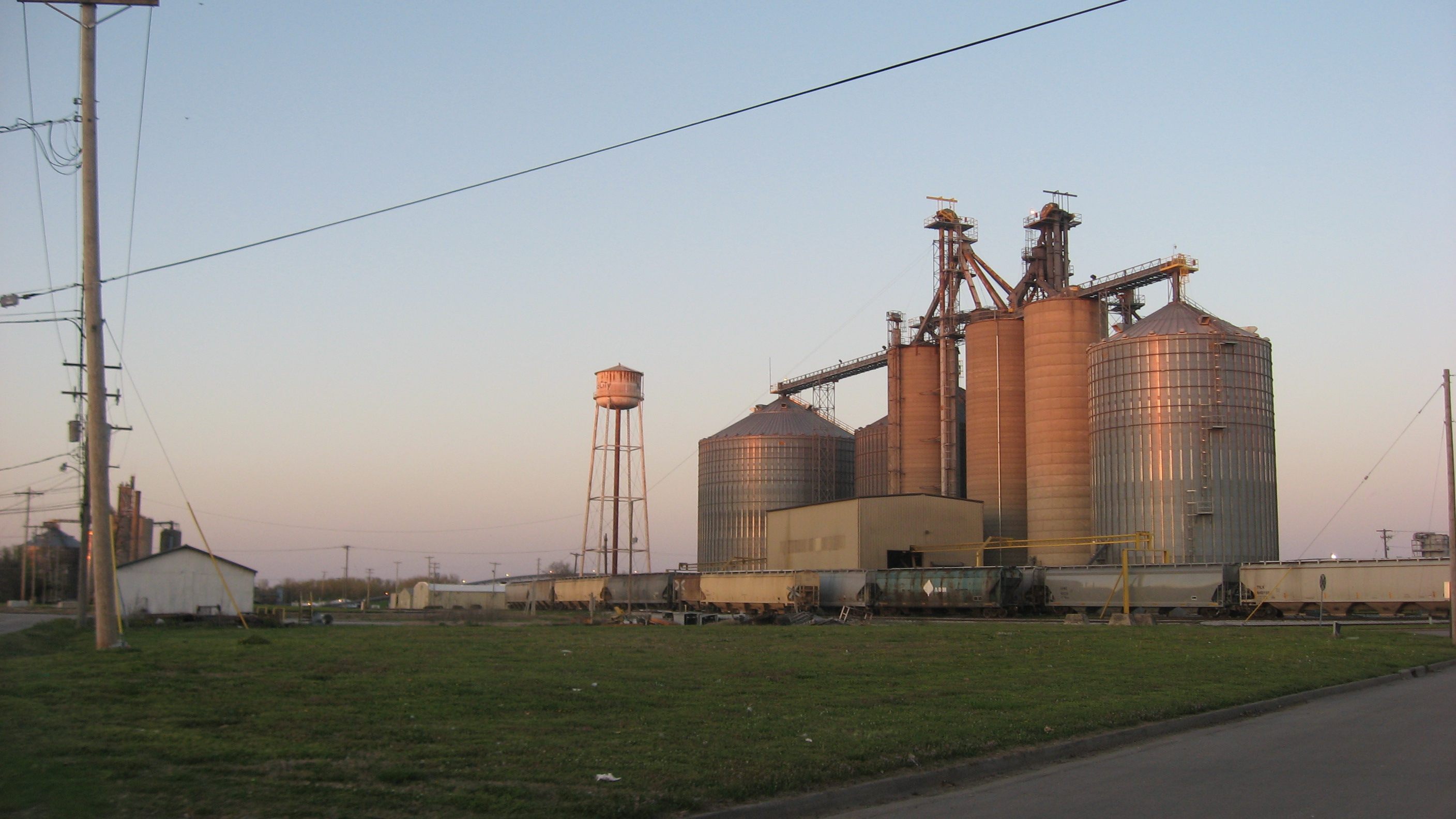
- Site of the hospital, now destroyed

- Location within Illinois Location within the United States
- Location: Commercial Ave. and Central St., Mound City, Illinois
- Coordinates: 37°5′8″N 89°9′47″W
- Area: 0.7 acres (0.28 ha)
- Built: 1858
- NRHP reference No.: 74002285
- Added to NRHP: October 9, 1974

The Mound City Civil War Naval Hospital was a naval hospital in Mound City, Illinois, used by the United States Navy during the Civil War. The hospital was established in 1861 in an existing brick building claimed by the U.S. government. It became one of the largest Union hospitals in the western states during the war.

Treatment at the hospital was led by Catholic nurses from Indiana. In addition to Union soldiers, the hospital also treated Confederate soldiers and freed slaves.

The hospital was added to the National Register of Historic Places on October 9, 1974. It has since been demolished.
