= Cache River (Illinois) =

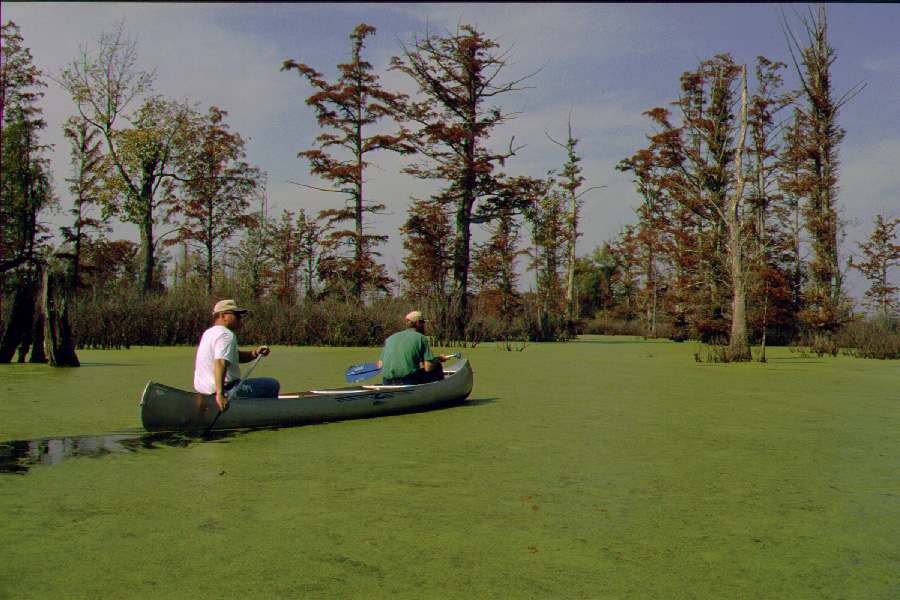
- A swamp along the river

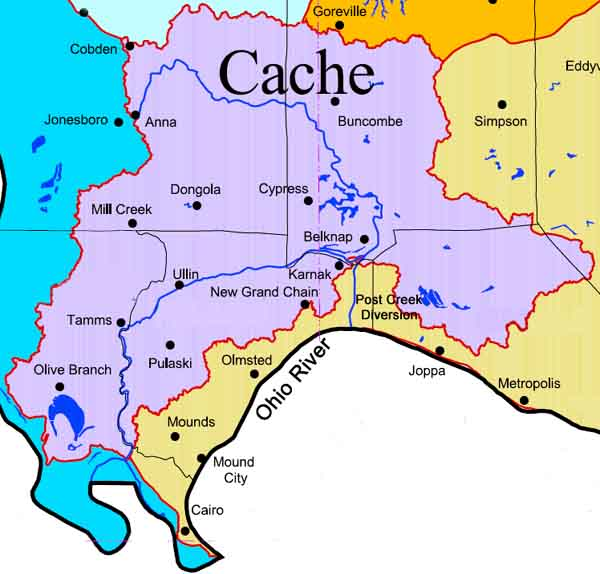
- Cache River Watershed Map

Location
- Country: United States
- State: Illinois

Physical characteristics
- Source
  - location: Anna, Union County, Illinois
  - coordinates: 37°27′00″N 89°14′44″W
- Mouth: Ohio River
  - location: South of Mound City, Alexander County, Illinois
  - coordinates: 37°04′01″N 89°10′22″W
- Length: 92 mi (148 km)
- Discharge
  - location: https://waterdata.usgs.gov/il/nwis/uv/?site_no=03612000&PARAmeter_cd=00065,00060 Forman, IL
  - average: 312 cu/ft. per sec.

Basin features
- Protection status

Ramsar Wetland
- Official name: Cache River and Cypress Creek Wetlands
- Designated: 1 November 1994
- Reference no.: 711

U.S. National Natural Landmark
- Designated: 1972 (Heron Pond); 1980 (Lower Cache)

The Cache River is a 92-mile-long (148 km) waterway in southernmost Illinois, in a region sometimes called Little Egypt. The basin spans 737 square miles (1,910 km^{2}) and six counties: Alexander, Johnson, Massac, Pope, Pulaski, and Union. Located at the convergence of four major physiographic regions, the river is part of the largest complex of wetlands in Illinois. The Cache River Wetlands is America's northernmost cypress/tupelo swamp and harbors 91 percent of the state's high quality swamp and wetland communities. It provides habitat for more than 100 threatened and endangered species in Illinois. In 1996, the Cache was designated a Wetland of International Importance under the Ramsar Convention.

A significant portion of the Cache River Wetlands are protected by the U.S. Fish and Wildlife Service and the Illinois Department of Natural Resources. Cypress Creek National Wildlife Refuge, established in 1990, covers 15,000 acres (61 km^{2}) of aquatic and riparian habitat, and is eventually planned to expand to 35,500 acres (144 km^{2}). The Illinois Department of Natural Resources' Cache River State Natural Area protects another 14,489 acres (58.63 km^{2}). Local landowners, through Wetlands Reserve Program easements with Natural Resources Conservation Service, protect an additional 13,500 acres (55 km^{2}) of restored wetlands. Also through NRCS, landowners are using a variety of conservation practices, such as conservation tillage, grassed waterways, and reforestation; many of these practices are through NRCS’ Environmental Quality Incentives and Wildlife Habitat Programs. In all, more than 45,000 acres (180 km^{2}) of private lands are using some sort of NRCS conservation program in the Cache River Watershed.

The Lower Cache River, a habitat that encompasses much of these landholdings, has been listed as a U.S. National Natural Landmark. The Heron Pond – Little Black Slough Nature Preserve, another National Natural Landmark, is located within the upper stretch of the Cache, upstream from the Post Creek Cutoff.

== History ==
The Cache River area was used as a trading crossroads by Native Americans, and has several sites of archeological interest within its boundaries, including the Cypress Citadel site just south of Cypress, Illinois.

French voyageurs gave the river its modern name, calling it Cache, which means secret or hidden place. American settlers arrived in the region in 1803. They found the soil too wet for farming, and the swamps full of mosquitoes and venomous snakes; many early settlers died of malaria. According to legend, from about the 1790s to 1820, Colonel Plug, a river pirate, ran a gang of cutthroats and preyed on unsuspecting travelers near the mouth of the Ohio River, stealing their goods and sinking or selling their watercraft down river. However, the Cache provided excellent hunting and fishing, and abundant timber. Belknap, IL resident W. Marshall stated that the Cache River Basin was “good country for men and dogs, but powerful trying on women and oxen.” Between 1810 and 1890 timber harvesting became a major industry in the Cache basin, Cypress wood was sought for its lightness and water-resistant properties. The small towns on the edge of the swamp experienced a small boom during this period. Several sawmills and small factories sprung up to process timber for lumber, railroad ties, charcoal, and packing crates and boxes.

== Drainage and diversion ==
After most of the accessible timber was cut, local industry shifted to agriculture, and a program of diversion and draining began. The landscape changed dramatically, largely due to a diversion channel that was cut to connect the Cache and the nearby Ohio River. Completed in 1916, the Post Creek Cutoff divided the Cache into two watersheds: the Upper Cache, which drains down the diversion channel to the Ohio, and the Lower Cache, which drains to the original outlet on the Mississippi River. In 1952, the Karnak levee was constructed, further cementing the division between the two rivers.

In 1950, about 11 miles (18 km) north of the Cache's natural mouth at the Mississippi River, a diversion channel was created to connect the Cache and Ohio rivers. Those last 11 miles (18 km) of the Cache continue to drain into the Mississippi through the original channel.

In 2002, the levee dividing the Post Creek Cutoff and the Lower Cache suffered a catastrophic failure during the spring flood season. The failure of the levee has resulted in dropping water levels in the Lower Cache. An interesting effect of this diversion is that in times of high water direction of flow on the lower Cache reverses, flowing east to the diversion channel. When the water level in the lower Cache drops below the diversion channel level, flow resumes its westerly travel to the Mississippi. Also, because of the breach, this section of the Cache is exposed to increased risk from flooding.

The future of the levee remains uncertain. Management of the levee falls to Big Creek Drainage District No. 2. The U.S. Army Corps of Engineers no longer considers the levee in its programs, making it ineligible for federal funding.

The Cache River Wetlands Joint Venture Partnership (composed of Ducks Unlimited, Illinois Department of Natural Resources, Natural Resources Conservation Service, The Nature Conservancy, and U.S. Fish and Wildlife Service) is considering a restoration project that could repair the levee as part of its efforts to restore low water flow. To date, two reports on this subject, created by the Center for Watershed Science at the Illinois State Water Survey, are publicly available.

== Conservation efforts ==
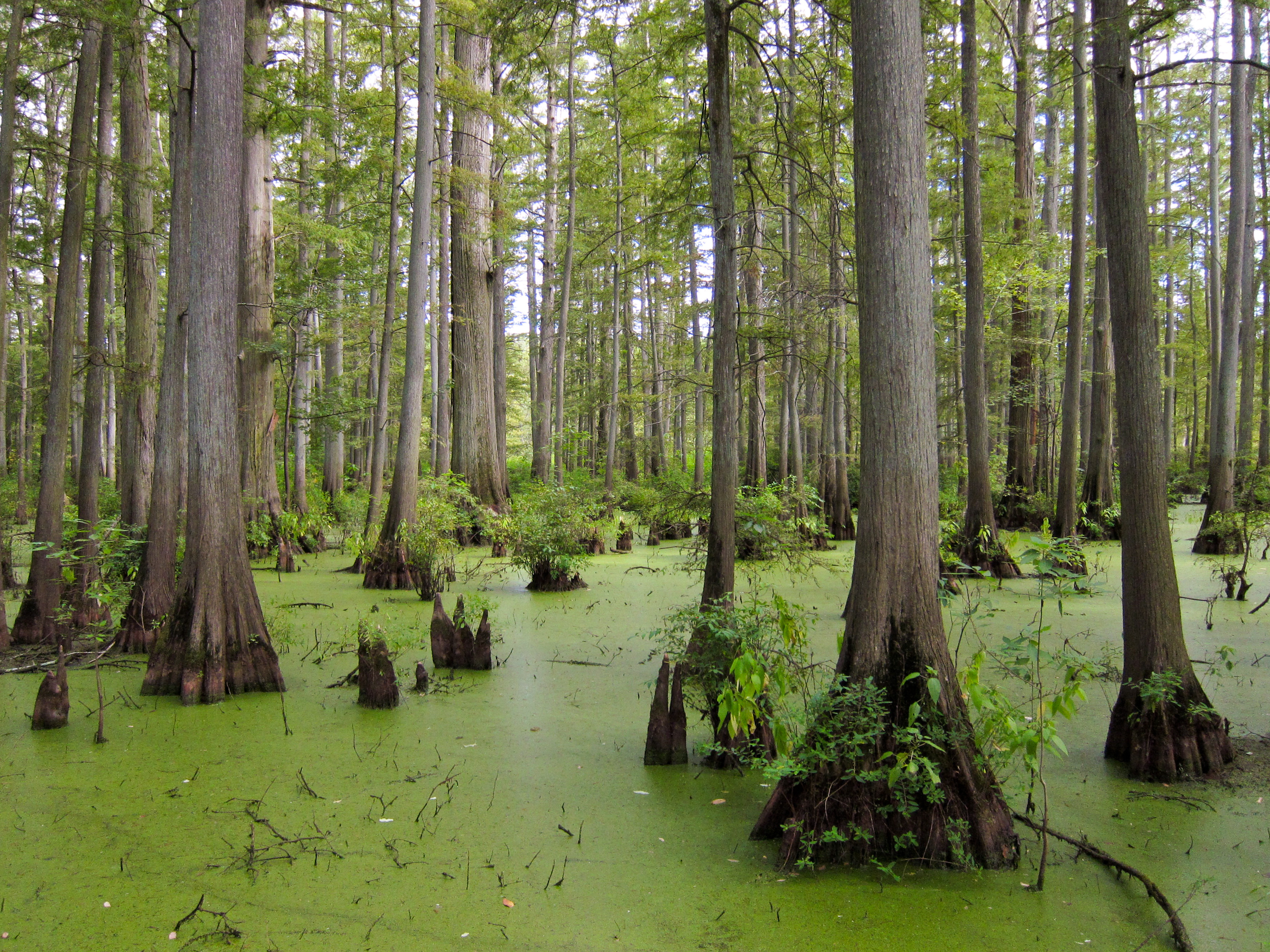
Heron Pond in the Cache River State Natural Area.

Sedimentation resulting from diversion and erosion

Since the 1970s, efforts have been made to restore the Cache to something more like its historic state. The Citizens Committee to Save the Cache River, a grassroots organization of hunters, fishermen, and nature lovers, enlisted the help of state and federal agencies as well as non-profit groups such as The Nature Conservancy to form the Cache River Wetlands Joint Venture Partnership.

During the past 15 years, efforts have been made to control erosion, reduce siltation, stabilize water levels, restore game species habitat, and provide recreational opportunities to the public. One long-term goal of the joint venture is to restore the hydrologic continuity of the Upper and Lower Cache.

Over the course of the restoration work, there have been tensions between the conservationists and some local landowners. Some of the region's farmers feared that restoration of the wetlands would cause flooding and loss of agricultural land, and many resented what they perceived as ‘outside influences’ meddling in their communities. Some local sportsmen feared that their favorite hunting and fishing grounds would either be put off limits or else overrun by visitors. State and Federal agencies have attempted at all times to reach compromise with local landowners and sportsmen, but tensions and resentment remain.

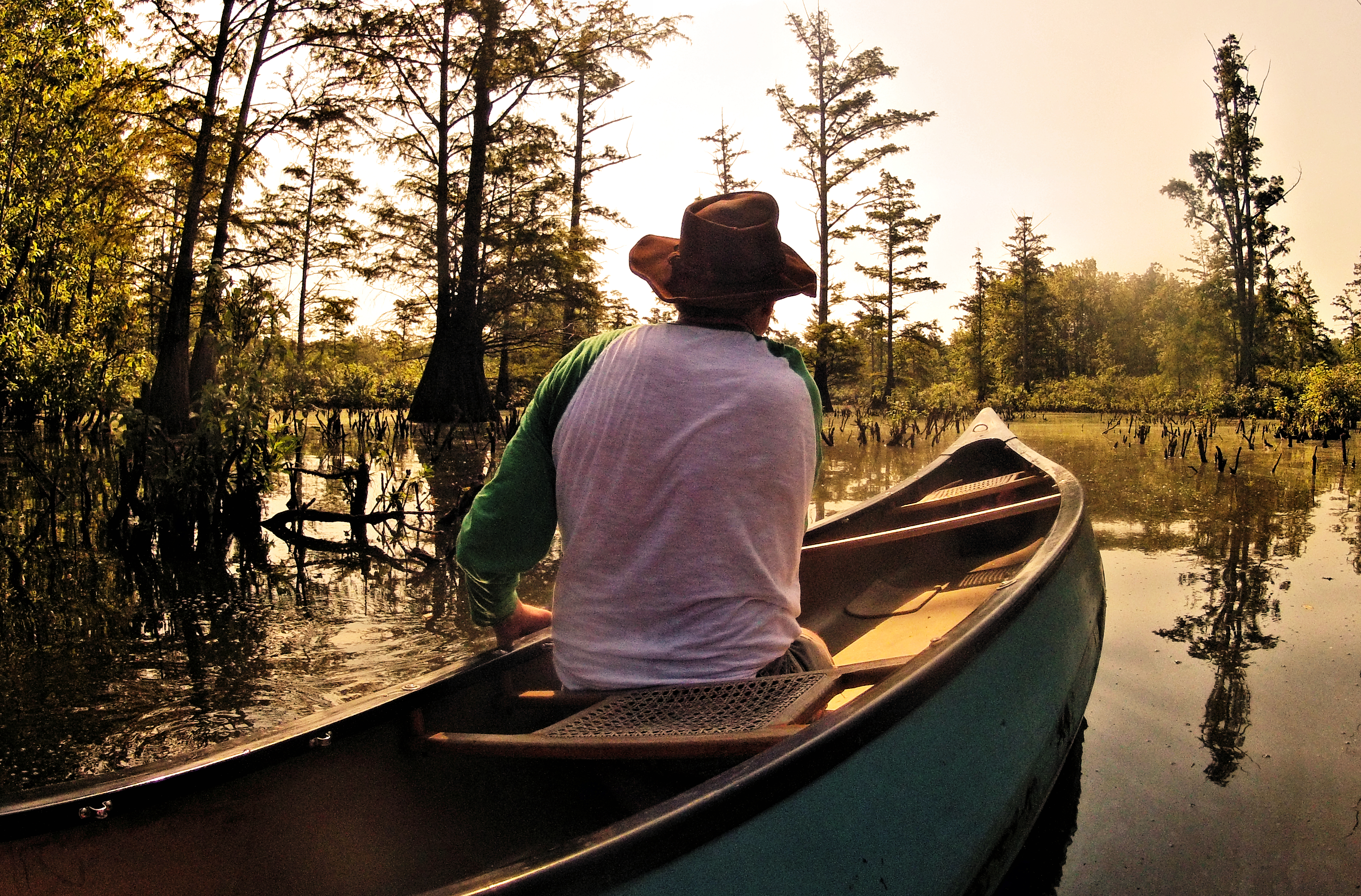
A canoeist on the Cache River

The Cache offers ample recreation opportunities, such as canoeing, hiking, bird watching, fishing, and hunting. The Henry N. Barkhausen Cache River Wetlands Center captures and exposes the unique natural and cultural history of the Cache River Wetlands, it also provides general information and guidance on the recreational activities of the region. The Wetlands Center also forms the southern anchor to the 47.5-mile (76.4 km) Tunnel Hill State Trail, a known bicycle trail favored by enthusiasts. The trail provides an excellent look at the sloughs and bottomland forest as it follows the disused Norfolk Southern Railway grade (originally owned by the Cairo and Vincennes Railroad) from Karnak to Vienna, then continuing north through the Shawnee National Forest to Harrisburg, Illinois.

The Friends of the Cache River Watershed is an organization that promotes natural resource conservation throughout the five county Cache River watershed. The organization focuses on environmental education, resource conservation, management, and related issues throughout the Cache Watershed. The organization advocates sustainable agriculture and forestry practices, as well as restoration of wetlands, bottomland, and upland forests. Friends of the Cache River Watershed facilitate a common meeting ground for individuals and entities associated with agriculture, education, tourism, rural communities, special interest groups, and government agencies that have an interest in the environment and natural resource usage, protection, and restoration.

== See also ==
- List of rivers of Illinois
- Watersheds of Illinois
