= Pulaski County, Illinois =

County in Illinois, United States

- County
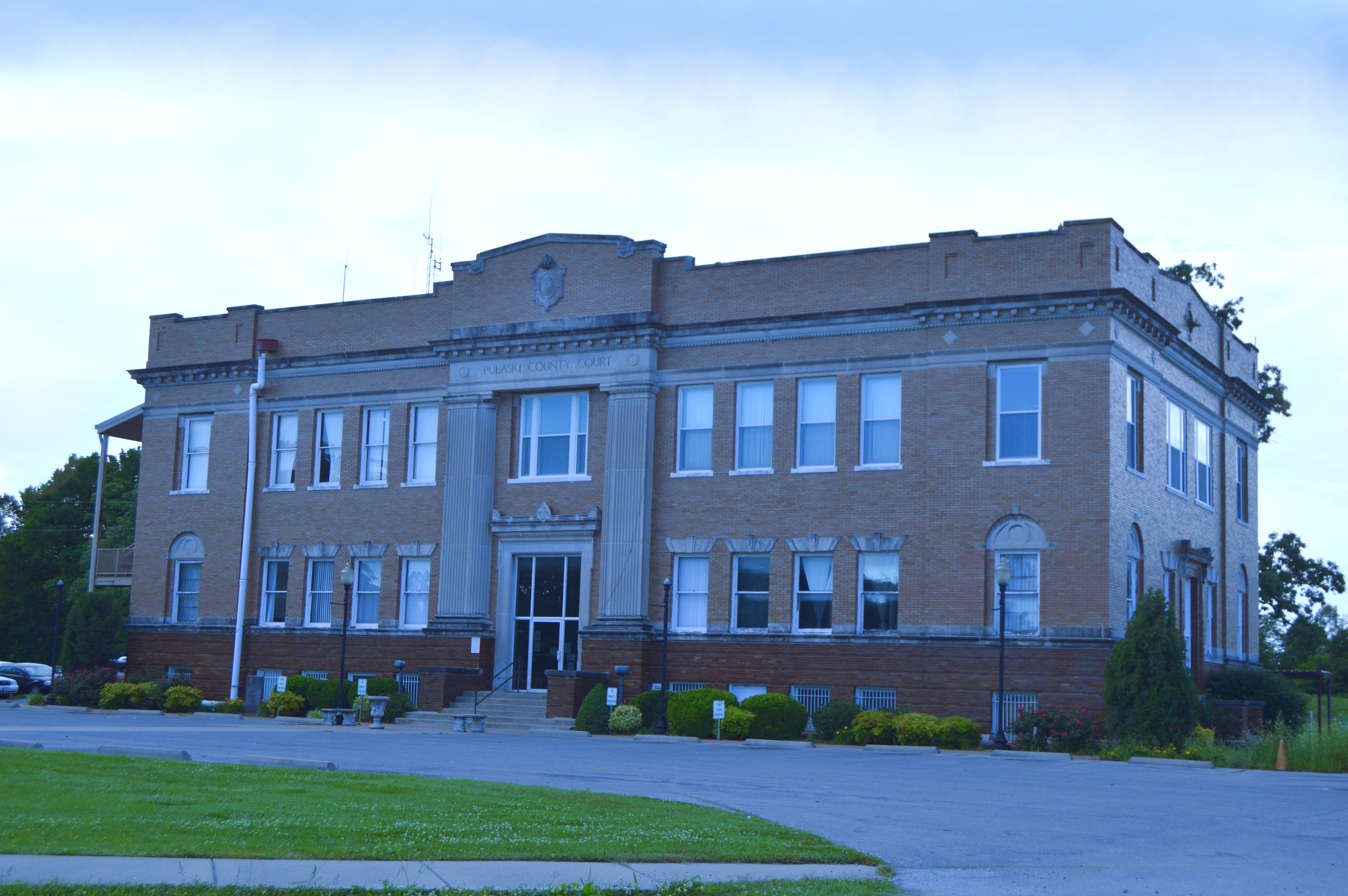
- Pulaski County Courthouse in Mound City

- Location within the U.S. state of Illinois
- Coordinates: 37°14′N 89°08′W
- Country: United States
- State: Illinois
- Founded: 1843
- Named for: Casimir Pulaski
- Seat: Mound City
- Largest city: Mounds

Area
  - Total: 203 sq mi (530 km^{2})
  - Land: 199 sq mi (520 km^{2})
  - Water: 4.0 sq mi (10 km^{2}) 2.0%

Population (2020)
  - Total: 5,193
  - Estimate (2025): 4,820 ▼
  - Density: 26.1/sq mi (10.1/km^{2})
- Time zone: UTC−6 (Central)
  - Summer (DST): UTC−5 (CDT)
- Congressional district: 12th
- Website: www.pulaskicountyil.net

Pulaski County is a county located in the U.S. state of Illinois. According to the 2020 census, it had a population of 5,193. Its county seat is Mound City. Its largest city is Mounds. It is located along the Ohio River in the southwestern portion of the state, known locally as "Little Egypt".

== History ==
Pulaski County was formed on March 3, 1843, out of parts of Alexander and Johnson counties. It was named in honor of Casimir Pułaski who was killed at the siege of Savannah in the Revolutionary War.

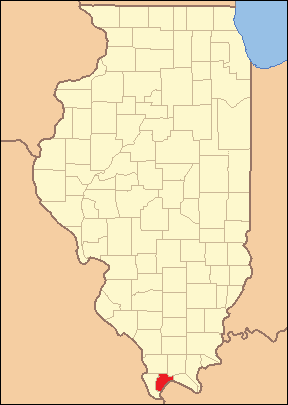
Pulaski County at the time of its creation in 1843

== Geography ==
According to the U.S. Census Bureau, the county has a total area of 203 square miles (530 km^{2}), of which 199 square miles (520 km^{2}) is land and 4.0 square miles (10 km^{2}) (2.0%) is water. It is the third-smallest county in Illinois by area.

=== Climate and weather ===
Mound City, Illinois

Climate chart (precipitation, max. and min. temperature)
J	F	M	A	M	J	J	A	S	O	N	D
3.2 41 26	3.6 48 30	4.4 58 39	4.7 69 50	4.8 78 59	4.2 86 67	4.4 90 71	3.6 87 69	3 81 61	3.4 71 49	4.4 57 39	4.2 46 30
- █ Average max. and min. temperatures in °F
- █ Precipitation totals in inches
- Source: The Weather Channel
Metric conversion
J	F	M	A	M	J	J	A	S	O	N	D
82 5 −3	90 9 −1	112 14 4	120 21 10	121 26 15	105 30 19	111 32 22	92 31 21	77 27 16	87 22 9	112 14 4	106 8 −1
- █ Average max. and min. temperatures in °C
- █ Precipitation totals in mm

In recent years, average temperatures in the county seat of Mound City have ranged from a low of 26 °F (−3 °C) in January to a high of 90 °F (32 °C) in July, although a record low of −12 °F (−24 °C) was recorded in January 1985 and a record high of 104 °F (40 °C) was recorded in June 1954. Average monthly precipitation ranged from 3.04 inches (77 mm) in September to 4.76 inches (121 mm) in May.

=== Major highways ===
- Interstate 57
- U.S. Highway 51
- Illinois Route 3
- Illinois Route 37
- Illinois Route 169

=== Adjacent counties ===
- Union County (north)
- Johnson County (northeast)
- Massac County (east)
- Ballard County, Kentucky (southeast)
- Alexander County (west)

=== National protected area ===
- Cypress Creek National Wildlife Refuge (part)

== Demographics ==
Historical population
Census	Pop.	Note	%±
1850	2,265		—
1860	3,943		74.1%
1870	8,752		122.0%
1880	9,507		8.6%
1890	11,355		19.4%
1900	14,554		28.2%
1910	15,650		7.5%
1920	14,629		−6.5%
1930	14,834		1.4%
1940	15,875		7.0%
1950	13,639		−14.1%
1960	10,490		−23.1%
1970	8,741		−16.7%
1980	8,840		1.1%
1990	7,523		−14.9%
2000	7,348		−2.3%
2010	6,161		−16.2%
2020	5,193		−15.7%
2025 (est.)	4,820	▼	−7.2%
U.S. Decennial Census; 1790-1960 1900-1990; 1990-2000 2010-2020 2020

=== 2020 census ===
As of the 2020 census, the county had a population of 5,193. The median age was 46.0 years. 20.5% of residents were under the age of 18 and 22.9% of residents were 65 years of age or older. For every 100 females there were 97.2 males, and for every 100 females age 18 and over there were 97.7 males age 18 and over.

Less than 0.1% of residents lived in urban areas, while 100.0% lived in rural areas.

There were 2,268 households in the county, of which 26.3% had children under the age of 18 living in them. Of all households, 40.1% were married-couple households, 23.0% were households with a male householder and no spouse or partner present, and 32.0% were households with a female householder and no spouse or partner present. About 35.4% of all households were made up of individuals and 17.9% had someone living alone who was 65 years of age or older.

There were 2,831 housing units, of which 19.9% were vacant. Among occupied housing units, 76.0% were owner-occupied and 24.0% were renter-occupied. The homeowner vacancy rate was 1.7% and the rental vacancy rate was 8.6%.

=== Racial and ethnic composition ===
Redistricting data provide the counts for each racial and ethnic group listed in the table below.

Pulaski County, Illinois – Racial and ethnic composition Note: the US Census treats Hispanic/Latino as an ethnic category. This table excludes Latinos from the racial categories and assigns them to a separate category. Hispanics/Latinos may be of any race.
Race / Ethnicity (NH = Non-Hispanic)	Pop 1980	Pop 1990	Pop 2000	Pop 2010	Pop 2020	% 1980	% 1990	% 2000	% 2010	% 2020
White alone (NH)	5,865	5,020	4,841	3,937	3,245	66.35%	66.73%	65.88%	63.90%	62.49%
Black or African American alone (NH)	2,900	2,459	2,249	1,976	1,462	32.81%	32.69%	30.61%	32.07%	28.15%
Native American or Alaska Native alone (NH)	19	8	10	25	36	0.21%	0.11%	0.14%	0.41%	0.69%
Asian alone (NH)	11	6	68	13	13	0.12%	0.08%	0.93%	0.21%	0.25%
Native Hawaiian or Pacific Islander alone (NH)	x	x	0	3	0	x	x	0.00%	0.05%	0.00%
Other race alone (NH)	4	1	6	14	14	0.05%	0.01%	0.08%	0.23%	0.27%
Mixed race or Multiracial (NH)	x	x	67	96	219	x	x	0.91%	1.56%	4.22%
Hispanic or Latino (any race)	41	29	107	97	204	0.46%	0.39%	1.46%	1.57%	3.93%
Total	8,840	7,523	7,348	6,161	5,193	100.00%	100.00%	100.00%	100.00%	100.00%

=== 2010 census ===
As of the 2010 census, there were 6,161 people, 2,642 households, and 1,658 families living in the county. The population density was 30.9 inhabitants per square mile (11.9/km^{2}). There were 3,155 housing units at an average density of 15.8 per square mile (6.1/km^{2}). The racial makeup of the county was 64.4% white, 32.4% black or African American, 0.4% American Indian, 0.2% Asian, 0.7% from other races, and 1.9% from two or more races. Those of Hispanic or Latino origin made up 1.6% of the population. In terms of ancestry, 15.1% were German, 6.8% were Irish, 6.6% were English, and 6.6% were American.

Of the 2,642 households, 27.3% had children under the age of 18 living with them, 43.6% were married couples living together, 14.3% had a female householder with no husband present, 37.2% were non-families, and 33.4% of all households were made up of individuals. The average household size was 2.32 and the average family size was 2.96. The median age was 43.2 years.

The median income for a household in the county was $31,173 and the median income for a family was $39,699. Males had a median income of $36,915 versus $29,007 for females. The per capita income for the county was $18,444. About 16.7% of families and 22.7% of the population were below the poverty line, including 32.0% of those under age 18 and 18.0% of those age 65 or over.

== Communities ==
=== Cities ===
- Mound City
- Mounds

=== Villages ===
- Karnak
- New Grand Chain (usually referred to as "Grand Chain")
- Olmsted
- Pulaski
- Ullin

=== Unincorporated communities ===
- America
- Perks
- Spencer Heights
- Villa Ridge
- Wetaug

== Politics ==
Pulaski County was often a swing county at the presidential level, but has voted for the Republican candidates for U.S. president since 2012.

This trend in Pulaski County has begun to affect down-ballot races as well. In the 2020 Senate election, longtime Democratic Senator Dick Durbin lost the county for the first time in his career, after winning it in his four prior elections.

United States presidential election results for Pulaski County, Illinois
Year	Republican		Democratic		Third party(ies)	
Year	No.	%	No.	%	No.	%
1892	1,662	63.22%	897	34.12%	70	2.66%
1896	2,081	63.97%	1,152	35.41%	20	0.61%
1900	2,039	64.79%	1,077	34.22%	31	0.99%
1904	2,180	70.71%	792	25.69%	111	3.60%
1908	2,185	65.24%	1,080	32.25%	84	2.51%
1912	1,632	51.27%	978	30.73%	573	18.00%
1916	3,863	62.72%	2,159	35.05%	137	2.22%
1920	4,002	62.85%	2,276	35.74%	90	1.41%
1924	3,355	61.57%	1,700	31.20%	394	7.23%
1928	3,319	65.18%	1,726	33.90%	47	0.92%
1932	3,225	47.95%	3,446	51.23%	55	0.82%
1936	3,774	49.37%	3,804	49.76%	67	0.88%
1940	4,589	56.76%	3,456	42.75%	40	0.49%
1944	3,248	58.02%	2,311	41.28%	39	0.70%
1948	2,658	52.81%	2,344	46.57%	31	0.62%
1952	3,447	58.88%	2,397	40.95%	10	0.17%
1956	2,966	56.74%	2,246	42.97%	15	0.29%
1960	2,621	52.83%	2,322	46.81%	18	0.36%
1964	1,716	33.99%	3,332	66.01%	0	0.00%
1968	1,741	37.59%	2,076	44.82%	815	17.59%
1972	2,485	59.27%	1,683	40.14%	25	0.60%
1976	1,836	42.26%	2,489	57.28%	20	0.46%
1980	2,083	50.82%	1,955	47.69%	61	1.49%
1984	1,923	52.48%	1,724	47.05%	17	0.46%
1988	1,666	47.90%	1,793	51.55%	19	0.55%
1992	1,169	32.94%	1,987	55.99%	393	11.07%
1996	1,036	36.82%	1,524	54.16%	254	9.03%
2000	1,430	47.41%	1,518	50.33%	68	2.25%
2004	1,720	55.34%	1,372	44.14%	16	0.51%
2008	1,593	48.72%	1,638	50.09%	39	1.19%
2012	1,564	51.93%	1,389	46.12%	59	1.96%
2016	1,675	61.24%	962	35.17%	98	3.58%
2020	1,699	64.58%	891	33.87%	41	1.56%
2024	1,583	66.35%	769	32.23%	34	1.42%

== See also ==
- Cantonment Wilkinson Site
- National Register of Historic Places listings in Pulaski County
