= National Register of Historic Places listings in Williamsburg County, South Carolina =

Location of Williamsburg County in South Carolina

This is a list of the National Register of Historic Places listings in Williamsburg County, South Carolina.

This is intended to be a complete list of the properties and districts on the National Register of Historic Places in Williamsburg County, South Carolina, United States. The locations of National Register properties and districts for which the latitude and longitude coordinates are included below, may be seen in a map.

There are 12 properties and districts listed on the National Register in the county. Another 2 properties and districts were once listed but have been removed.

This National Park Service list is complete through NPS recent listings posted September 19, 2025.

== Current listings ==
	Name on the Register	Image	Date listed	Location	City or town	Description
1	Clarkson Farm Complex		October 6, 1988 (#88001706)	U.S. Route 52, 1.5 miles south of its junction with U.S. Route 521; 33°33′38″N 79°55′57″W	Greeleyville	
2	Epps-McGill Farmhouse	Epps-McGill Farmhouse	September 25, 2020 (#100005612)	679 Eastland Ave. 33°40′27″N 79°48′56″W	Kingstree vicinity	
3	Gamble House		December 8, 1978 (#78002535)	West of Nesmith off South Carolina Highway 502; 33°40′17″N 79°35′26″W	Nesmith	
4	M.F. Heller House	M.F. Heller House	May 19, 1994 (#94000452)	405 Academy St. 33°40′05″N 79°49′56″W	Kingstree	
5	Kingstree Historic District	Kingstree Historic District	June 28, 1982 (#82003906)	Main, Hampton and Academy Sts.; also E. Mill St., Hampton Ave., N. Main St., S. Main St., N. Academy St., S. Academy St. 33°39′49″N 79°49′51″W	Kingstree	Second set of addresses represent a boundary increase approved September 24, 2025.
6	McCollum-Murray House		July 11, 2006 (#06000579)	C.E. Murray Boulevard; 33°34′59″N 79°59′33″W	Greeleyville	
7	New Market		March 26, 1998 (#98000290)	South Carolina Highway 375, approximately 5 miles south of Greeleyville; 33°32′21″N 79°59′23″W	Greeleyville	
8	Colonel John Gotea Pressley House	Colonel John Gotea Pressley House	June 10, 1997 (#97000534)	216 N. Academy St. 33°40′18″N 79°50′07″W	Kingstree	
9	Salters Plantation House		June 2, 2000 (#00000591)	Gapway Rd. (County Road 197); 33°36′01″N 79°51′18″W	Salters	
10	Scott House	Scott House	June 28, 1982 (#82004797)	506 Live Oak St. 33°40′16″N 79°49′52″W	Kingstree	
11	Thorntree	Thorntree	October 28, 1970 (#70000606)	South Carolina Highway 527, in Fluitt-Nelson Memorial Park; 33°39′44″N 79°49′35″W	Kingstree	
12	John Calvin Wilson House	John Calvin Wilson House	June 28, 1982 (#82003905)	South Carolina Highway 512, 3.7 miles northwest of its junction with SC Hwy 261; 33°45′10″N 79°39′31″W	Indiantown	

== Former listings ==
	Name on the Register	Image	Date listed	Date removed	Location	City or town	Description
1	Black Mingo Baptist Church	Black Mingo Baptist Church	August 21, 1980 (#80003713)	March 15, 2000		Rhems vicinity	Destroyed by arsonists on August 1, 1993.
2	Brockinton-Scott House		January 22, 1980 (#80003712)	December 12, 1989	221 West Railroad Avenue	Kingstree	Demolished

== See also ==
- List of National Historic Landmarks in South Carolina
- National Register of Historic Places listings in South Carolina
