= Bottosaurus =

Bottosaurus Temporal range: Campanian - Paleocene, 78–56.8 Ma

Scientific classification
- Kingdom: Animalia
- Phylum: Chordata
- Class: Reptilia
- Clade: Archosauria
- Order: Crocodilia
- Family: Alligatoridae
- Subfamily: Caimaninae
- Genus: †Bottosaurus; Agassiz, 1849

Type species
- †Bottosaurus harlani Agassiz, 1849

Species
- †B. fustidens Cossette, 2020; †B. harlani (von Meyer, 1832) (type); †B. tuberculatus Cope, 1869

Extinct genus of reptiles

Bottosaurus is an extinct genus of alligatorid from the Late Cretaceous-Early Paleocene of New Jersey, Texas, and possibly North Carolina and South Carolina. Two species are currently accepted, with a third requiring re-evaluation.

== Taxonomy and distribution ==
2010s phylogenetic studies have recovered Bottosaurus as a member of Alligatoridae within the subfamily Caimaninae, which indicates that Bottosaurus is more closely related to caimans than to alligators.

Bottosaurus harlani is predominantly found from Late Cretaceous strata of Maastrichtian age, such as the Hornerstown Formation and New Jersey Greensands. Fossil teeth from the Coachman Formation of South Carolina, one of which closely resembles that of B. harlani, in addition to concurrent records from the Tar Heel Formation of North Carolina, supports its occurrence in the Campanian stage. New material has been reported from the Rhems and Williamsburg Formations of the Black Mingo Group of the South Carolina coastal plain that dates back to the Danian and Thanetian stages of the Paleocene epoch, suggesting that Bottosaurus had survived the Cretaceous–Paleogene extinction event and lived through much of the early Paleogene period. However, this material is fragmentary, and referral to Bottosaurus should be treated as tentative.

Another species, Bottosaurus fustidens, has recently been described from the middle Paleocene (Tiffanian) of western Texas. The species is based on substantial craniomandibular and postcranial material and more solidly places Bottosaurus on the younger side of the Cretaceous-Paleogene boundary.

== Description ==
Bottosaurus had distinctively thick osteoderms that lacked the pitting of most other crocodylians. The unusual blunt, conical tribodont crushing teeth are the most common diagnostic material to fossilize and be recovered, although teeth from the posterior portion of the jaw tend to be more laterally compressed like those of other related crocodiles. The teeth had a "wrinkled" enamel surface and prominent annual rings with vertical ridges running down them. A short, massive lower jaw that is nearly circular in cross-section is evident from remains of the type species B. harlani. The linear frontoparietal suture between the supratemporal fenestrae indicates that Bottosaurus is related the caimans.

The fossil jaw of a juvenile B. harlani has been recorded from the Main Fossiliferous Layer of the Hornerstown Formation of New Jersey, which is located directly on the Cretaceous-Paleogene boundary and likely represents a thanatoecoenosis in the aftermath of Cretaceous-Paleogene extinction event.
