= John G. Pressley =

American lawyer and Lieutenant colonel

John Gotea Pressley
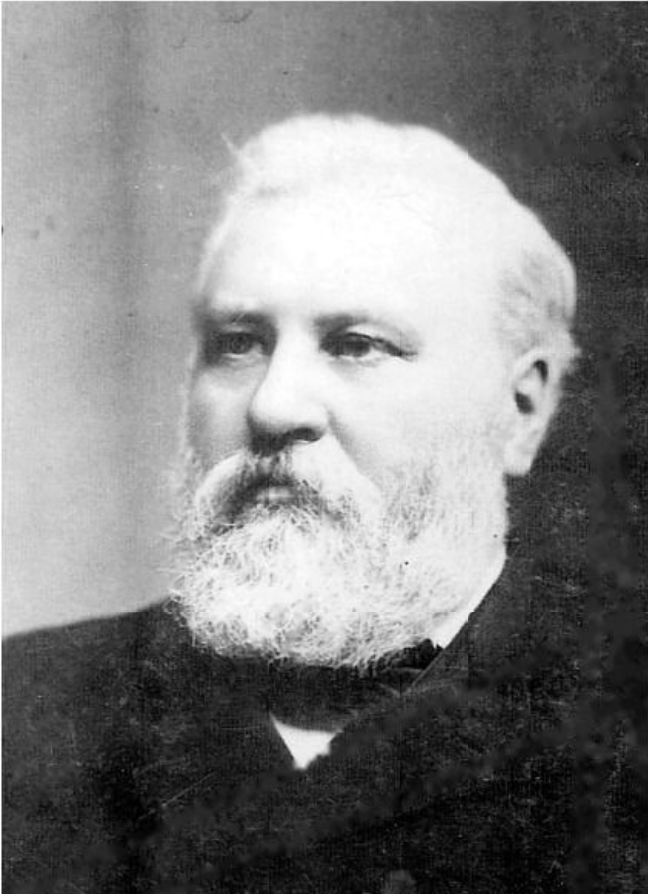

Member of the South Carolina House of Representatives
- In office 1858–1859

City Attorney of Suisun City, California
- In office 1870–1873

City Attorney of Santa Rosa, California
- In office 1873–1875

Judge on the Sonoma County Superior Court
- In office 1875–1895

Personal details
- Born: 24 May 1833 Williamsburg County, South Carolina, USA
- Died: 5 July 1895 (aged 62) Cazadero, California, California, USA
- Resting place: Santa Rosa Rural Cemetery
- Party: Democratic
- Spouse: Julia C. Burckmeyer
- Children: 12
- Education: The Citadel
- Occupation: Attorney and judge

Military service
- Allegiance: Confederate States
- Branch/service: Confederate States Army
- Years of service: 1861–1864
- Rank: Lieutenant colonel
- Commands: 25th South Carolina Infantry

John Gotea Pressley (May 24, 1833 – July 5, 1895) was an American lawyer, judge, and Lieutenant colonel during the American Civil War. Originally from South Carolina, Pressley moved to Santa Rosa, California where he served as an influential judge on the Sonoma County Superior Court for fifteen years.

== Early life and career ==
John Gotea Pressley was born May 24, 1833 in Williamsburg County, South Carolina to John Brockington Pressley (1810–1863) and Sarah Pressley (née Gotea) as the second of ten children. His father's family was descended from Scottish Covenanters and his mother's from French Huguenots. John B. Pressley was a successful and influential planter, and in 1848 he secured an appointment for John G. Pressley to attend The Citadel military academy in Charleston. Pressley graduated with distinction from the academy in November 1851, and was known to have a character "marked by rigid truthfulness, manly self-respect, diligence in study and a conscientious observance of the stringent military rules and regulations of the institution."

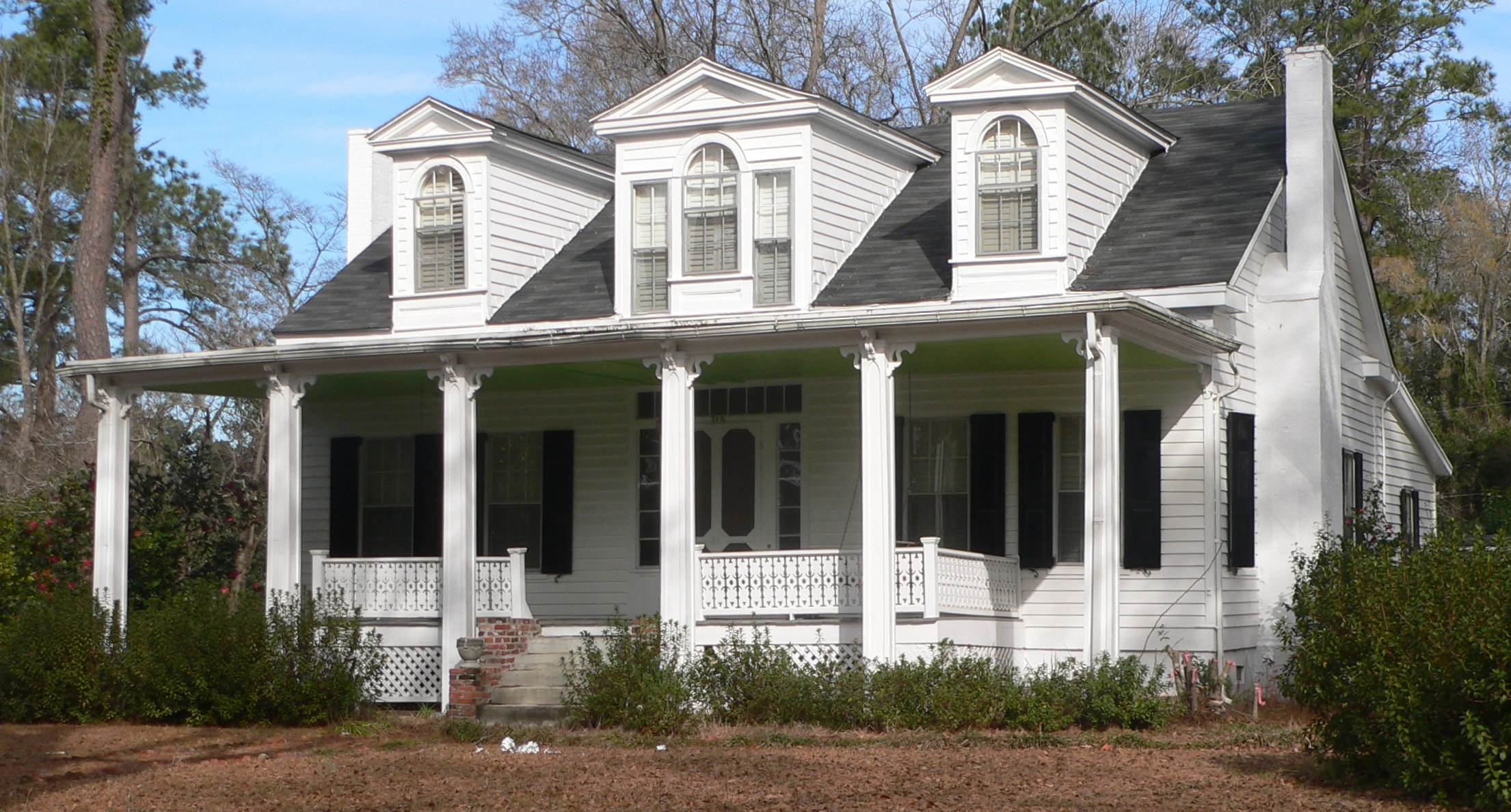
Colonel John Gotea Pressley House in Kingstree, South Carolina

After graduation Pressley was taken on as an apprentice by his relative, Benjamin C. Pressley, a prominent Charleston lawyer and future South Carolina Circuit Court judge. It was this relative who, in 1854, managed to obtain admission to the bar for John despite him being under the required age of 21 (the first such instance in South Carolina's history). That same year Pressley moved to Kingstree and opened a law practice there.

In 1854 Pressley married Julia C. Burckmeyer (1833–1907), the daughter of a prominent Charleston merchant. Together they would have twelve children: Elizabeth B. Pressley (1854–1916); Margaret J. Pressley (1856–1877); Mary A. Pressley (1858–1859); John B. Pressley (1859–1859); Marcy C. Pressley (1860–1919); Cornelius B. Pressley (1862–1940); Anna L. Pressley (1865–1877); Benjamin C. Pressley (1868–1934); Hugh G. Pressley (1870–1876); William G. Pressley (1871–1952); and Lawrence A. Pressley (1872–1923).

A committed Baptist, Pressley was ordained a deacon in Charleston in 1856. He was for several years a trustee of Furman University and active in national and state Baptist denominational conventions.

In 1858 Pressley was elected to the South Carolina House of Representatives for Kingstree as its second youngest member, and served in that role until 1859.

== Civil War ==
On December 20, 1860, Pressley was among the 170 delegates to the secession convention of South Carolina to sign the South Carolina Declaration of Secession.

Shortly following the outbreak of the Civil War in 1861, Pressley enlisted with the 25th South Carolina Volunteers under the command of Charles Henry Simonton. Initially awarded the rank of captain, Pressley was later made lieutenant colonel of the regiment. Throughout the war Pressley was present in several major engagements, including at Drewry's Bluff; Cold Harbor; and Petersburg- where Pressley was wounded and would permanently lose some mobility in his arm.

== California and judicial career ==
Following the conclusion of the Civil War, Pressley and his family decided to move to California, first settling in the recently founded Suisun City in Solano County to the northeast of San Francisco, in April 1869. For three years, beginning in 1870, Pressley served as the City Attorney. While here he also served as a trustee and secretary of California College from 1870 to 1873.

In 1873 the family moved to Santa Rosa in Sonoma County, where Pressley took on the role of City Attorney there and opened a successful practice. Active in the local legal community, in 1875 Pressley was elected to the bench of the Sonoma County Court. In 1880, following the reorganization of the California judicial system, Pressley was re-elected to the newly formed Sonoma County Superior Court, and would remain on the bench for fifteen years and oversee numerous important cases.

== Death and legacy ==
Pressley died suddenly of heart failure on July 5, 1895 while enjoying an annual camping trip with his family in nearby Cazadero at the age of 62. According to news reports, Pressley died in the arms of his R.P. Legro, his close family friend and a Union veteran. He is buried in the Santa Rosa Rural Cemetery alongside his wife and several of his children.

Upon Pressley's death, Justice Jackson Temple of the Supreme Court of California, who had served on the Sonoma County bench with Pressley, eulogized him as "... a judge of the first class. While he was strong in his opinions he was practical to an extreme... His mind was essentially judicial. He had no great power as a pleader, but on matters of law his judgment was seldom wrong."

Today his one-time home in Kingstree, the Colonel John Gotea Pressley House, is listed on the National Register of Historic Places. Pressley Street in Santa Rosa is named for him.
