= Early history of Williamsburg, South Carolina =

This article discusses the early history of Williamsburg County, South Carolina

== Founding ==
Williamsburg, named after William of Orange, was one of eleven townships ordered by King George II in 1730 meant to develop the "back country" of the Carolina Province. The township was a part of Craven County, one of the original four counties that encompassed present South Carolina. Williamsburg Township then included most of the present Pee Dee region. The township consisted 20,000 acres (80 km^{2}) and was located in front of the Black River. It was later divided and became a number of separate counties, including present Williamsburg County, South Carolina.

A white pine tree on the Black River was marked by early surveyor with the King's Arrow to claim it for the King. The tree was referred to as “The King's Tree,” and became the center of the new township. Kingstree eventually became the chief town of Williamsburg township.

Colonial historians record three Native American tribes with territories nearby: the Wee Tee, the Wee Nee (Winyah), and the Mingo tribes.

In 1732 a colony of forty Scots-Irish led by Roger Gordon came up the river by boat and settled in the vicinity of the King's Tree. They were poor Protestants who had come from northern Ireland. They had settled there seeking a better life than in Scotland, before migrating to America.

Early European colonists faced harsh conditions. The life expectancy for those who survived infancy was around 50 years. The settlers tried to establish farmsteads in the territories of several American Indian peoples, but had few conflicts with them. At first there was considerable trade with the Indians, but their populations fell dramatically due to epidemics of new infectious diseases, to which they had no immunity. Hazards for the settlers included venomous snakes and wolves, which were very common in the early years.

== Religion ==
The established church in the colony was Anglican, and no churches or schools could be established without the consent of the Lord Bishop or his agent. The Scots-Irish had suffered persecution from the Church of England and settlers quickly established a religious society which was Presbyterian, although they did not use the name until later. In 1736 they called The Rev. John Willison from Scotland to be their minister. They built a meeting house that became Williamsburg Presbyterian Church. Soon new daughter churches were established at Indiantown and Black Mingo.

In 1780 John Witherspoon, a grandson of one of the early settlers, who were all deceased by then, wrote: "...they were servers of God, were well acquainted with the Scriptures, were much engaged in prayer, were strict observers of the Sabbath, in a word, they were a stock of people that studied outward piety as well as inward purity of life."

== Productivity ==
They also prospered. The wilderness abounded in deer, wild turkeys, fish and muscadine grapes. As the colony grew, they established plantations. Wheat from Europe grew poorly, but corn produced abundantly. Flax was grown for cloth, later it was gradually replaced by cotton. The cattle and hogs which they brought with them reproduced and found abundant forage; they were let run wild in the swamps and forests, with only the owner's mark to identify them. About 1750 settlers adopted the newly introduced crop of indigo, and many of the plantation owners became wealthy from it. They also grew rice in modified wetlands along the river. Eventually a large naval store industry developed, which was followed by timbering. The latter has continued into modern times.

== War ==
In 1759 during the French and Indian War, the French enlisted the large Cherokee tribe as allies. Though the Cherokee lived to the northwest of Williamsburg, they could threaten the entire colony. Two companies of volunteer militia were organized to fight for the English king (and for self-defense). Together with other companies from coastal Carolina, a regiment was formed, which mustered and drilled at Kingstree. They also built a stockade for the residents in case of Indian attack.

When the American Revolution broke out, some of the young men joined the army and were sent for the defense of Charleston. After Charleston surrendered to the British in early 1780, the soldiers were paroled and returned home, expecting to remain neutral from then on.

The British quickly established garrisons throughout South Carolina, including a fort at nearby Georgetown on the coast. In the upstate were a larger number of Tories, who joined the British forces. The Williamsburg Presbyterians were inclined to sit out the war, until the British made a tactical error. The colonial governor ordered that all men who had taken parole must take up arms for the King. The people took this to be a unilateral violation of the terms of their parole. They sent Captain John James, a local militia officer, to the fort at Georgetown for clarification. He was mistreated by the commander, Captain Ardesoif, and on his return, James quickly raised a militia of four companies. They were put under the command of Francis Marion, of French Huguenot descent.

Marion was one of the most effective military officers of the Revolution. He had the complete loyalty of this militia, who served with no pay and no promise of pay, who provided their own weapons and horses, or secured them whenever they defeated the British.

The only area of South Carolina which was not occupied by the British was that of Williamsburg. The British tried to establish a garrison at Willtown, but Marion's men defeated and drove them off in the Battle of Mingo Creek. Marion not only won tactical victories against superior forces with small cost, but also won a moral victory which turned the tide in the Revolution in South Carolina.

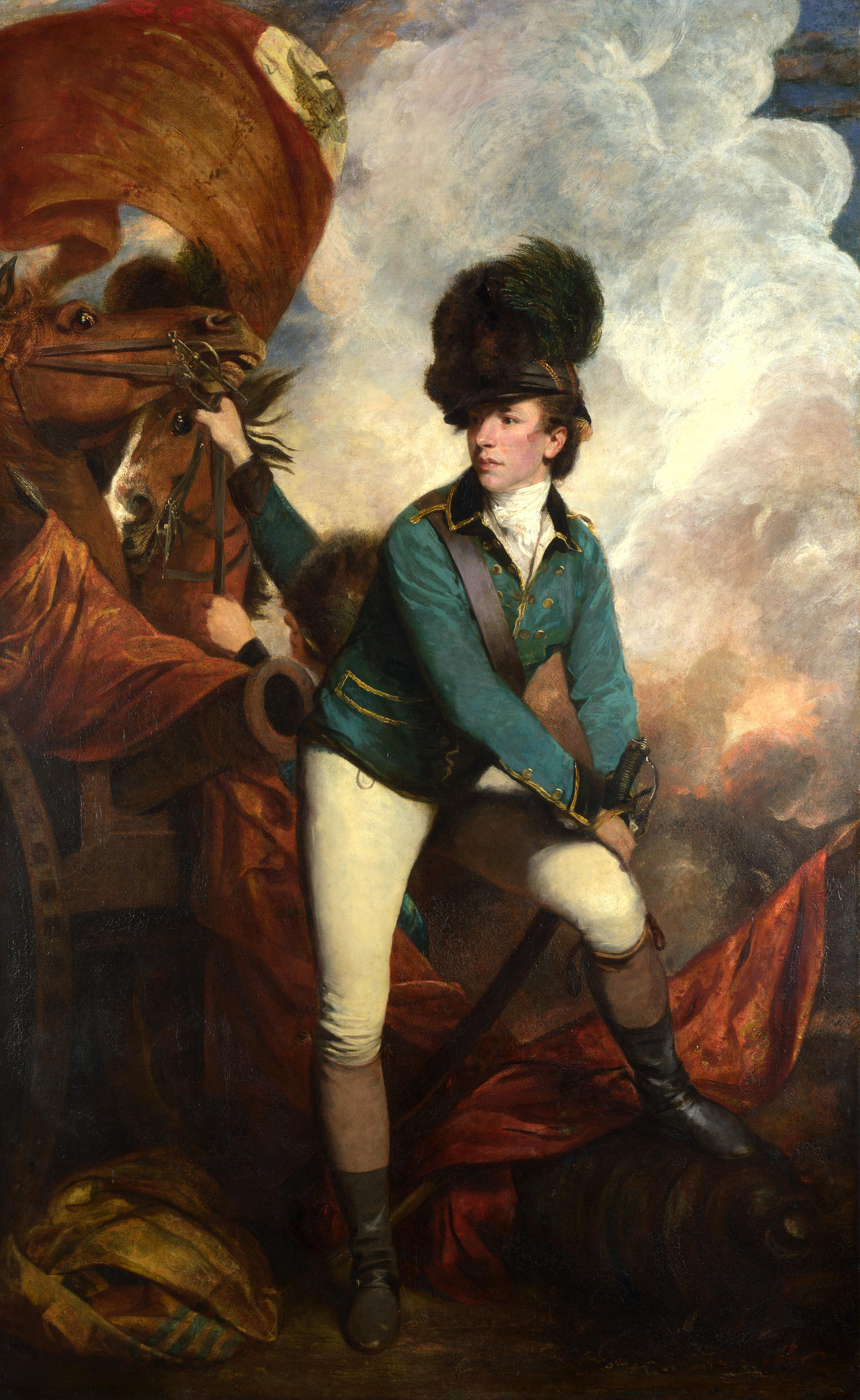
Lieutenant-Colonel Banastre Tarleton by Sir Joshua Reynolds, 1782

He did this in two ways, first by holding a section of the colony that the British could not penetrate, which raised morale of Patriot forces elsewhere. Secondly he gave residents receipts for horses, boats, weapons and food supplies that were commandeered, or were destroyed to keep from falling into the hands of the British. This was in stark contract to the British officers Banastre Tarleton and James Wemyss, who burned and looted Williamsburg early in the war. The British burning of the Williamsburg and Indiantown Presbyterian churches, which the British called "hotbeds of sedition," angered the settlers.

When settlers presented their receipts from Marion to the new state government after the war, the state paid the claims for reimbursement.

Marion depended on the local people to quickly gain information about British movements; the opposing officers tried to neutralize him, but had little success. Both relied on spies among the populace, but Williamsburg was loyal to Marion. Tarleton, cursing Marion when he could not catch him, gave him the epithet, "The Swamp Fox."

The Williamsburg Militia served as needed, coming quickly when called, but remaining at home to plant and harvest crops, and attend to other duties whenever possible. Toward the end of the war, Marion could quickly call up a couple thousand men. Marion's Men held their territory alone until General Nathanael Greene arrived later in the war. They helped Greene's forces evict the British from their upstate garrisons and drive them back to Charleston, from whence they eventually surrendered and left by ship.

== See also ==
- Eliza Lucas
