= Williamsburg Formation =

Geologic formation in South Carolina, United States

- Stratigraphic range: Thanetian (Clarkforkian); ~58–55 Ma
- Type: Formation
- Unit of: Black Mingo Group
- Overlies: Rhems Formation

Lithology
- Primary: Sandstone
- Other: Phosphorite

Location
- Coordinates: 33.7°N 79.8°W
- Approximate paleocoordinates: 34.8°N 62.6°W
- Region: South Carolina
- Country: United States

Type section
- Named for: Williamsburg County, South Carolina

The Williamsburg Formation is a geologic formation in South Carolina consisting of sandy shale and clayey sand. It is a member of the Black Mingo Group and overlays the Rhems Formation. It preserves fossils, among others coprolites, dating back to the Paleogene period.

== Fossil content ==
The following fossils were reported from the formation:

=== Mammals ===
- Ectoganus gliriformis
- E. lobdelli
- Mingotherium holtae

=== Reptiles ===
- Agomphus pectoralis
- A. aff. alabamensis
- Osteopygis emarginatus
- Trionyx virginiana
- Adocus sp.
- ?Bothremys sp.
- Chelonioidea indet.
- Cheloniidae indet.
- Pelomedusoides indet.
- Taphrosphyini indet.
- Toxochelyinae indet.

Crocodylians

- Bottosaurus sp.
- Hyposaurus sp.
- Thoracosaurus sp.
- Eusuchia indet.

Snakes

- Palaeophis sp.

== See also ==
- List of fossiliferous stratigraphic units in South Carolina
- Paleontology in South Carolina
