= Epps-McGill Farmhouse =

Victorian home

- Epps-Mcgill Farmhouse
- U.S. National Register of Historic Places
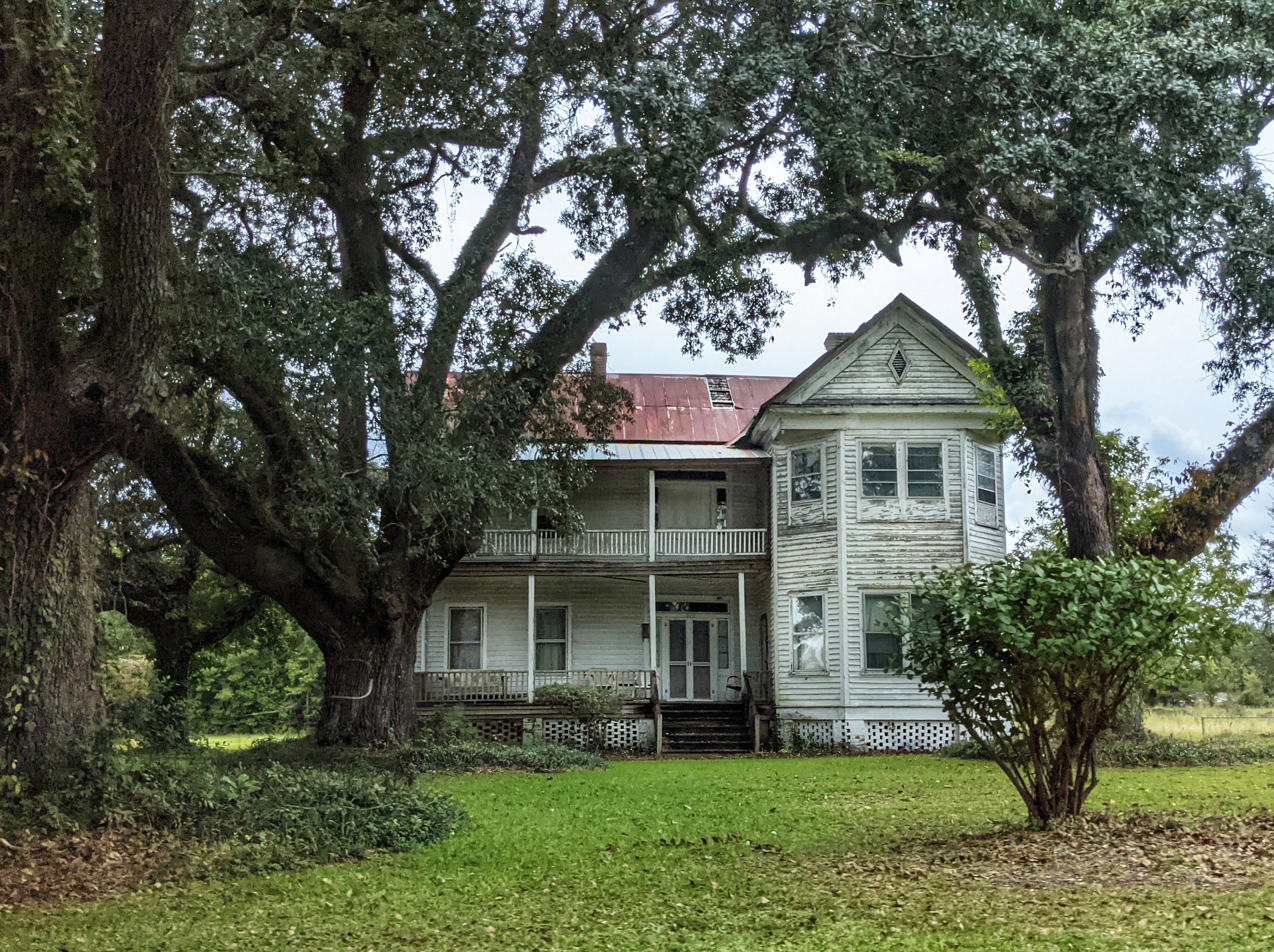

- Location within South Carolina Location within the United States
- Location: Eastland Avenue, near Kingstree, South Carolina
- Coordinates: 33°40′28.09″N 79°48′56.95″W
- Area: 2 acres (0.81 ha)
- Built: 1907
- NRHP reference No.: 100005612
- Added to NRHP: September 25, 2020

Epps-Mcgill Farmhouse is a two-story Folk Victorian style 3,658 square feet (339.8 m^{2})home located near Kingstree, in Williamsburg County, South Carolina. Construction of the home began in 1905 by Silas Wightman Epps. It was listed on the National Register of Historic Places in 2020.

== Description ==
The Epps-Mcgill Farmhouse was the residence for multiple generations of farmers that worked in field surrounding the property, which was originally 51 acres (21 ha) in size. The farmhouse is known for is high level of architectural integrity, with little changes being made during its existence, and for its unique ownership as a rare instance of success in the sharecropping system of the American South when purchased by African American farmer Weaver McGill in 1976.

== See also ==
National Register of Historic Places listings in Williamsburg County, South Carolina
