= Santa Rosa Rural Cemetery =

Cemetery in Santa Rosa, California, United States

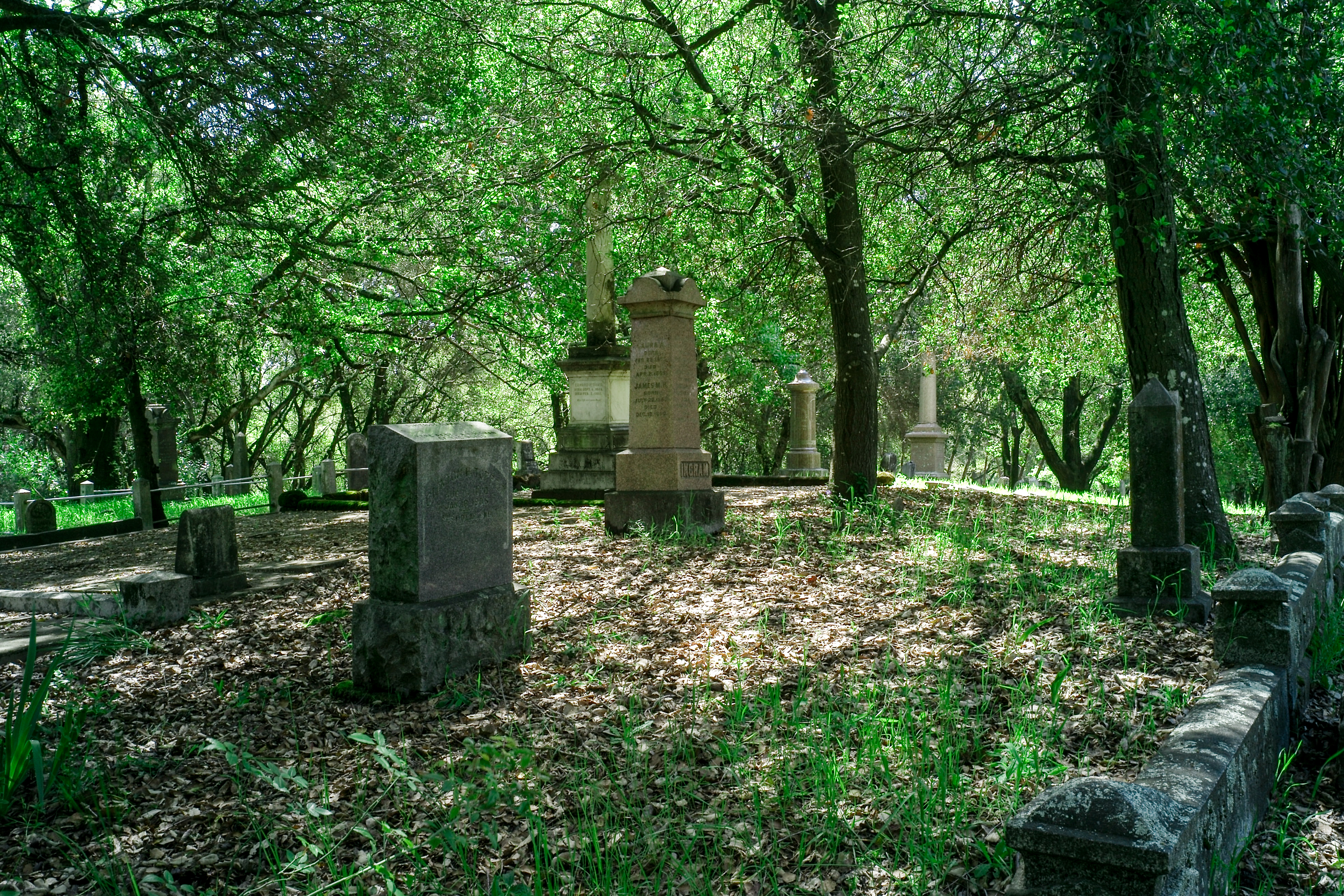
- Santa Rosa Rural Cemetery, Santa Rosa, California
- Interactive map of Santa Rosa Rural Cemetery

Details
- Established: 1854
- Location: 1600 Franklin Avenue, Santa Rosa, California, US
- Country: United States
- Coordinates: 38°27′20″N 122°42′17″W
- Type: Rural
- Owned by: City of Santa Rosa
- Website: https://www.srcity.org/1044/Santa-Rosa-Rural-Cemetery

The Santa Rosa Rural Cemetery is a cemetery located in Santa Rosa, California, United States. Originally founded in the 1850s as four distinct cemeteries: the Old Rural Cemetery; the Fulkerson Cemetery; the Moke Cemetery; and the Stanley Cemetery- the grounds have been operated together as a single cemetery by the City of Santa Rosa since 1979.

== History ==
The Santa Rosa Rural Cemetery was founded in November 1854 as a place to bury Thomas W. Mize (1832-1854), a 31-year-old father who had emigrated to California from Iowa during the California Gold Rush two years prior, after he had accidentally drowned in a pond. At the time, the area was a wooded hillside beyond the city limits owned by Olivier Beaulieu (1810-1896), a French-Canadian born farmer.

Over the next several years many of the city's early residents chose to be buried on the same hillside, and in 1867 the Santa Rosa Rural Cemetery Association was formally established and seventeen acres were designated for future burials.

During the 1930s the cemetery began to fall into disrepair. Several sections were partitioned and sold off, forming the adjacent Fulkerson; Moke; and Stanley Cemeteries. In 1965 the Santa Rosa Rural Cemetery Association, which had previously disbanded, reformed to take care of the grounds which had become overgrown and damaged by vandalism.

In 1979, all five cemeteries were merged and ownership was transferred to the City of Santa Rosa. In 1997 the cemetery was made a historic landmark. The cemetery contains over 5,500 burials and offers volunteer run historic tours. It is adjacent to the Santa Rosa Memorial Park cemetery.

== Notable burials ==
- James B. Armstrong, (1824-1900) American Civil War officer and businessman
- John All Barham, (1843-1926) lawyer and Member of Congress (1895-1901)
- Thomas J. Geary, (1854-1929) lawyer and Member of Congress (1890-1895)
- Barclay Henley, (1843-1914) lawyer and Member of Congress (1883-1887)
- Mark Lindsey McDonald, (1833-1917) businessman and railroad tycoon
- Edward Neblett, (1818-1907) businessman and first Mayor of Santa Rosa
- William Wood Porter, (1826-1907) American Civil War officer and Justice of the Arizona Territorial Supreme Court (1885-1889)
- John G. Pressley, (1833-1895), American Civil War officer, lawyer, and judge
- Jackson Temple, (1827-1902), Associate Justice of the Supreme Court of California (1870-1872; 1886-1889; 1895-1902)
- Thomas Larkin Thompson, (1838-1898), newspaper publisher, Secretary of State of California (1883-1887), and Member of Congress (1887-1889)
