= Thomas J. Geary =

American politician and lawyer (1854-1929)

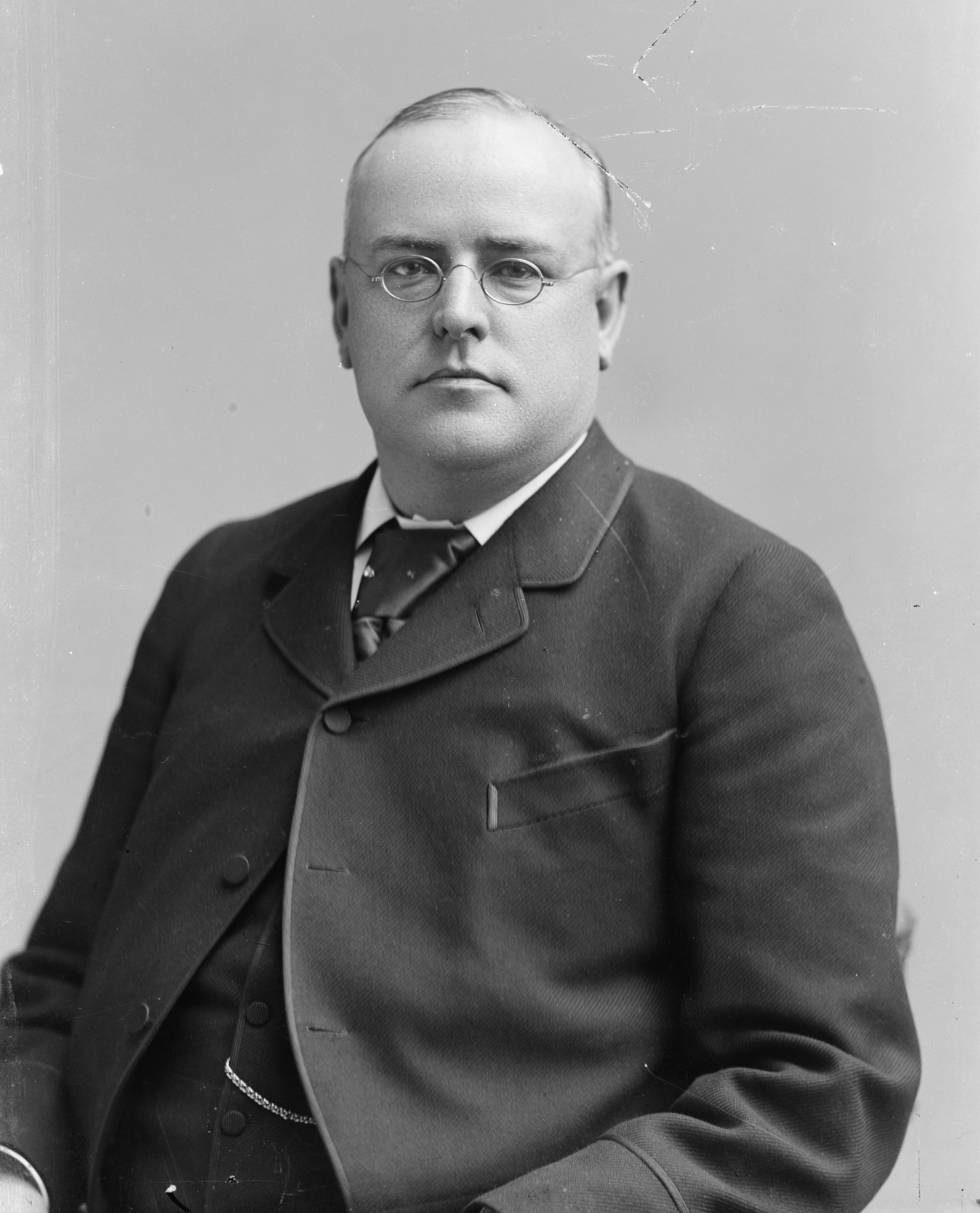
- Portrait by C. M. Bell, c. 1891–1894

Member of the U.S. House of Representatives from California's 1st district
- In office December 9, 1890 – March 3, 1895
- Preceded by: John J. De Haven
- Succeeded by: John All Barham

Personal details
- Born: January 18, 1854 Boston, Massachusetts
- Died: July 6, 1929 (aged 75) Santa Rosa, California
- Resting place: Santa Rosa Rural Cemetery
- Party: Democratic Party
- Occupation: Attorney

Thomas J. Geary (January 18, 1854 – July 6, 1929) was an American lawyer and politician who served three terms as a U.S. representative from California from 1890 to 1895.

== Biography ==
Born in Boston, Massachusetts, Geary moved with his parents to San Francisco, California, in April 1863. He attended the public schools. He studied law at St. Ignatius College. He was admitted to the bar in 1877 and commenced practice in Petaluma, California, moving to Santa Rosa, California, in 1882. He served as district attorney of Sonoma County, California, in 1883 and 1884. He resumed the practice of law.

=== Congress ===
Geary was elected as a Democrat to the Fifty-first Congress to fill the vacancy caused by the resignation of John J. De Haven. He was reelected to the Fifty-second and Fifty-third Congresses and served from December 9, 1890, to March 3, 1895. He was an unsuccessful candidate for reelection in 1894 to the Fifty-fourth Congress.

Representative Geary and wrote and sponsored the Geary Act, a United States law passed by Congress on May 5, 1892, that extended the Chinese Exclusion Act of 1882. It added onerous new requirements, such as requiring every Chinese resident of the United States to carry a resident permit at all times. Failure to carry the permit was punishable by deportation or a year of hard labor. In addition, Chinese citizens were not allowed to bear witness in court, and could not receive bail in habeas corpus proceedings.

=== Later career and death ===
After losing his bid for reelection, Geary resumed his practice of law. He moved to Nome, Alaska, in 1900 in junction with the Gold Rush going on there at the time, to San Francisco, California, in 1902, and returned to Santa Rosa, California, in 1903, continuing the practice of law. He retired from active pursuits in 1923.

=== Death and burial ===
He died in Santa Rosa, California, July 6, 1929. He was interred in the Santa Rosa Rural Cemetery.

== Electoral history ==
1890 United States House of Representatives elections
| Party | Candidate | Votes | % |
|---|---|---|---|
| Democratic | Thomas J. Geary | 19,334 | 49.3 |
| Republican | John All Barham | 19,153 | 48.8 |
| Prohibition | L. B. Scranton | 759 | 1.9 |
| Total votes | | 39,246 | 100.0 |
| Democratic gain from Republican | | | |

1892 United States House of Representatives elections
| Party | Candidate | Votes | % |
|---|---|---|---|
| Democratic | Thomas J. Geary (Incumbent) | 19,308 | 56.8 |
| Republican | Edward W. Davis | 13,123 | 38.6 |
| Populist | C. C. Swafford | 1,546 | 4.6 |
| Total votes | | 33,977 | 100.0 |
| Democratic hold | | | |

1894 United States House of Representatives elections
| Party | Candidate | Votes | % |
|---|---|---|---|
| Republican | John All Barham | 15,101 | 41.1 |
| Democratic | Thomas J. Geary (Incumbent) | 13,570 | 37.0 |
| Populist | Roger F. Grigsby | 7,246 | 19.7 |
| Prohibition | J. R. Gregory | 790 | 2.2 |
| Total votes | | 36,707 | 100.0 |
| Republican gain from Democratic | | | |

== See also ==
- John P. Irish of Oakland, opponent of Geary

U.S. House of Representatives
| Preceded by John J. De Haven | Member of the U.S. House of Representatives from California's 1st congressional district 1890–1895 | Succeeded by John All Barham |
