= Trio, South Carolina =

- Unincorporated community
- Location within South Carolina Location within the United States
- Coordinates: 33°29′10″N 79°43′03″W
- Country: United States
- State: South Carolina
- County: Williamsburg
- Elevation: 56 ft (17 m)
- Time zone: UTC-5 (Eastern (EST))
  - Summer (DST): UTC-4 (EDT)
- Area codes: 843, 854
- GNIS feature ID: 1227213

Trio (/ˈtraɪoʊ/) is an unincorporated community in Williamsburg County, South Carolina, United States. Trio is 9.4 miles (15.1 km) west-northwest of Andrews.

== History ==
The community of Trio, was named for a trio of brothers, William D. Bryan, Walter R. Bryan, and James Bryan, who relocated to the area from North Carolina during the late 19th century to establish a turpentine business along the Georgetown and Western Railroad. In 1883 the Bryan brothers established a post office and officially named the community Trio, pronounced "Try-oh" in the local dialect. A small community subsequently grew around the post office.

The two-story brick building that originally housed the Trio Post Office served multiple purposes for local residents throughout the twentieth century. It functioned as a rural store, health clinic, and financial institution, known as The Bank of Trio. The building is no longer in use today, and is in a state of disrepair, but remains a local landmark.

The community of Trio has an AME church on Trio road, a fire station, the Bank of Trio/Trio Post Office, and 2 convenience stores as well as houses.

== Notable people ==
- J. Victor Rowell (1939–2021), member of the South Carolina House of Representatives
