= Mount Zion AME Church (Greeleyville, South Carolina) =

1995 church arson by the KKK in South Carolina

- Mount Zion AME Church
- 33.58686°N 79.98284°W
- Location: Greeleyville, South Carolina
- Country: United States
- Denomination: African Methodist Episcopal Church

Architecture
- Demolished: June 2015

Mount Zion AME Church was an African Methodist Episcopal Church in Greeleyville, South Carolina. The church building burned on June 20, 1995, as the result of arson by two Ku Klux Klan members. In 1996, President Bill Clinton traveled to Greeleyville for the dedication of the rebuilt church. The church was destroyed by fire again in June 2015 after being struck by lightning during an electrical storm.

== See also ==
- Black Methodism in the United States
