= John All Barham =

American lawyer and politician (1843-1926)

John A. Barham
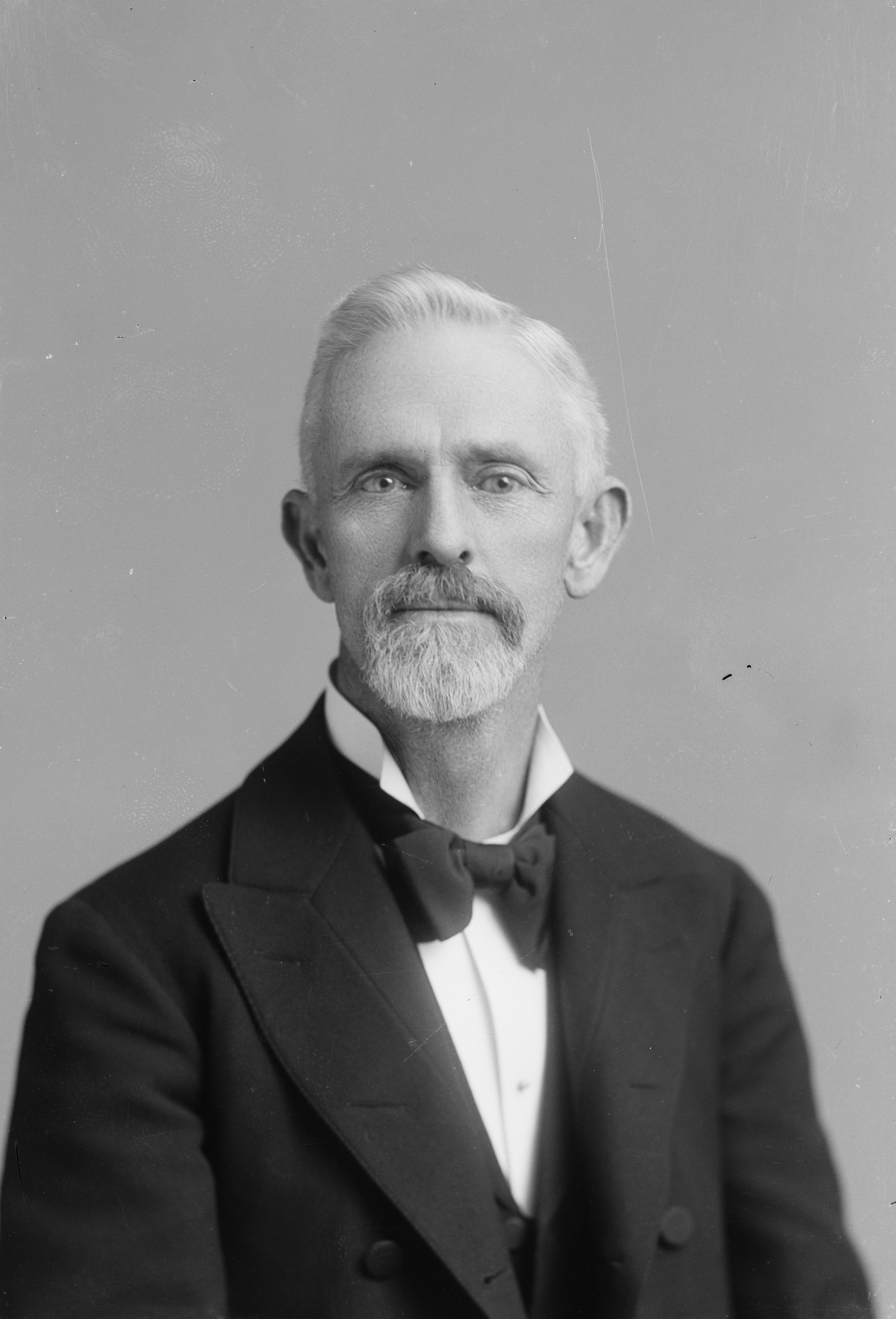
- Portrait c. 1895–1896

Member of the U.S. House of Representatives from California's 1st district
- In office March 4, 1895 – March 3, 1901
- Preceded by: Thomas J. Geary
- Succeeded by: Frank Coombs

Personal details
- Born: John All Barham; July 17, 1843 Cass County, Missouri, US
- Died: January 22, 1926 (aged 82) Santa Rosa, California, US
- Resting place: Santa Rosa Rural Cemetery
- Party: Republican

John All Barham (July 17, 1843 – January 22, 1926) was an American lawyer and politician who served three terms as a U.S. representative from California from 1895 to 1901.

== Biography ==
Barham was born on a farm in Cass County, Missouri on July 17, 1843. He moved to California with his parents in 1849 during the California Gold Rush, ending up settling in Woodland, where he attended the common schools and Hesperian College.

=== Early career ===
Between 1864 and 1876, Barham taught in public schools. He studied law and was admitted to the bar in 1865, commencing practice in Watsonville, San Francisco, and Santa Rosa.

=== Congress ===
Barham was elected as a Republican to the Fifty-fourth, Fifty-fifth, and Fifty-sixth Congresses, running from March 4, 1895, to March 3, 1901. During this time he served as chairman of the Committee on Mileage during the Fifty-fifth and the Fifty-sixth Congresses, but he was not a candidate for renomination in 1900.

=== Later career and death ===
He continued working in the practice of law until his death in Santa Rosa, on January 22, 1926. He was buried in Santa Rosa Rural Cemetery. Barham Avenue in Santa Rosa is named after him.

== Electoral history ==
George W. Monteith, Barham's Populist Party opponent in the 1896 election

1894 United States House of Representatives elections
Party	Candidate	Votes	%
Republican	John All Barham	15,101	41.1
Democratic	Thomas J. Geary (Incumbent)	13,570	37.0
Populist	Roger F. Grigsby	7,246	19.7
Prohibition	J. R. Gregory	790	2.2
Total votes		36,707	100.0
Republican gain from Democratic			

1896 United States House of Representatives elections
Party	Candidate	Votes	%
Republican	John All Barham (Incumbent)	17,826	49.7
Democratic	Fletcher A. Cutler	16,328	45.5
Populist	George W. Monteith	1,497	4.2
Prohibition	B. F. Taylor	249	0.7
Total votes		35,900	100.0
Republican hold			

1898 United States House of Representatives elections
Party	Candidate	Votes	%
Republican	John All Barham (Incumbent)	19,598	51.8
Democratic	Emmett Seawell	18,244	48.2
Total votes		37,842	100.0
Turnout			
Republican hold			

U.S. House of Representatives
Preceded by Thomas J. Geary	Member of the U.S. House of Representatives from California's 1st congressional district 1895–1901	Succeeded by Frank L. Coombs
