= Black Mingo Group =

- Stratigraphic range: Paleogene
- Type: Group
- Sub-units: Rhems Formation, Williamsburg Formation

Lithology
- Primary: shale
- Other: clay, sand

Location
- Region: South Carolina
- Country: United States

Type section
- Named for: Black Mingo Creek

The Black Mingo Group is a geologic group in South Carolina composed of dark grey to black clays, shales, laminated sandy shales, and yellow-red sands. The group's name comes from Black Mingo Creek where outcrops of the group are exposed. The bottom boundary is an unconformity with Cretaceous deposits. It preserves fossils dating back to the Paleogene period.

== See also ==
- List of fossiliferous stratigraphic units in South Carolina
- Paleontology in South Carolina
