= J. Victor Rowell =

American politician

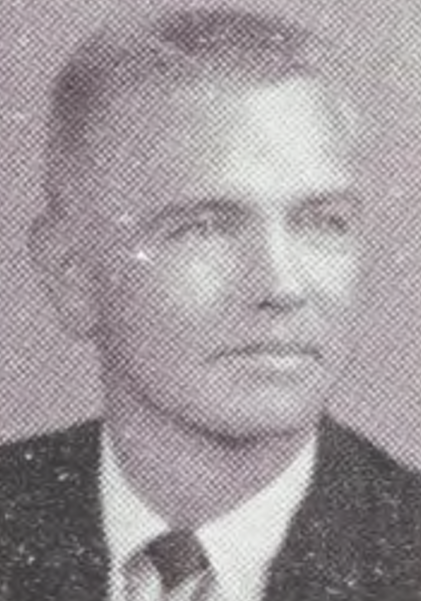
- Rowell in 1971

Member of the South Carolina House of Representatives from Williamsburg County
- In office 1969–1972

Personal details
- Born: James Victor Rowell; September 18, 1939 Kingstree, South Carolina, U.S.
- Died: November 16, 2021 (aged 82) Trio, South Carolina, U.S.
- Party: Republican
- Spouse: Pearl Casselman
- Children: 2

James Victor Rowell (September 18, 1939 – November 16, 2021) was an American politician. A member of the Republican Party, he served in the South Carolina House of Representatives from 1969 to 1972.

== Life and career ==
Rowell was born in Kingstree, South Carolina, the son of Ervin Robert Rowell and Hallie Boykin. He attended Williamsburg High School, graduating in 1957. After graduating, he attended the University of South Carolina, but did not graduate. He was a farmer.

Rowell served in the South Carolina House of Representatives from 1969 to 1972.

== Death ==
Rowell died on November 16, 2021, at his home in Trio, South Carolina, at the age of 82.
