= Kingstree station =

Passenger train station in Kingstree, South Carolina

Kingstree, SC
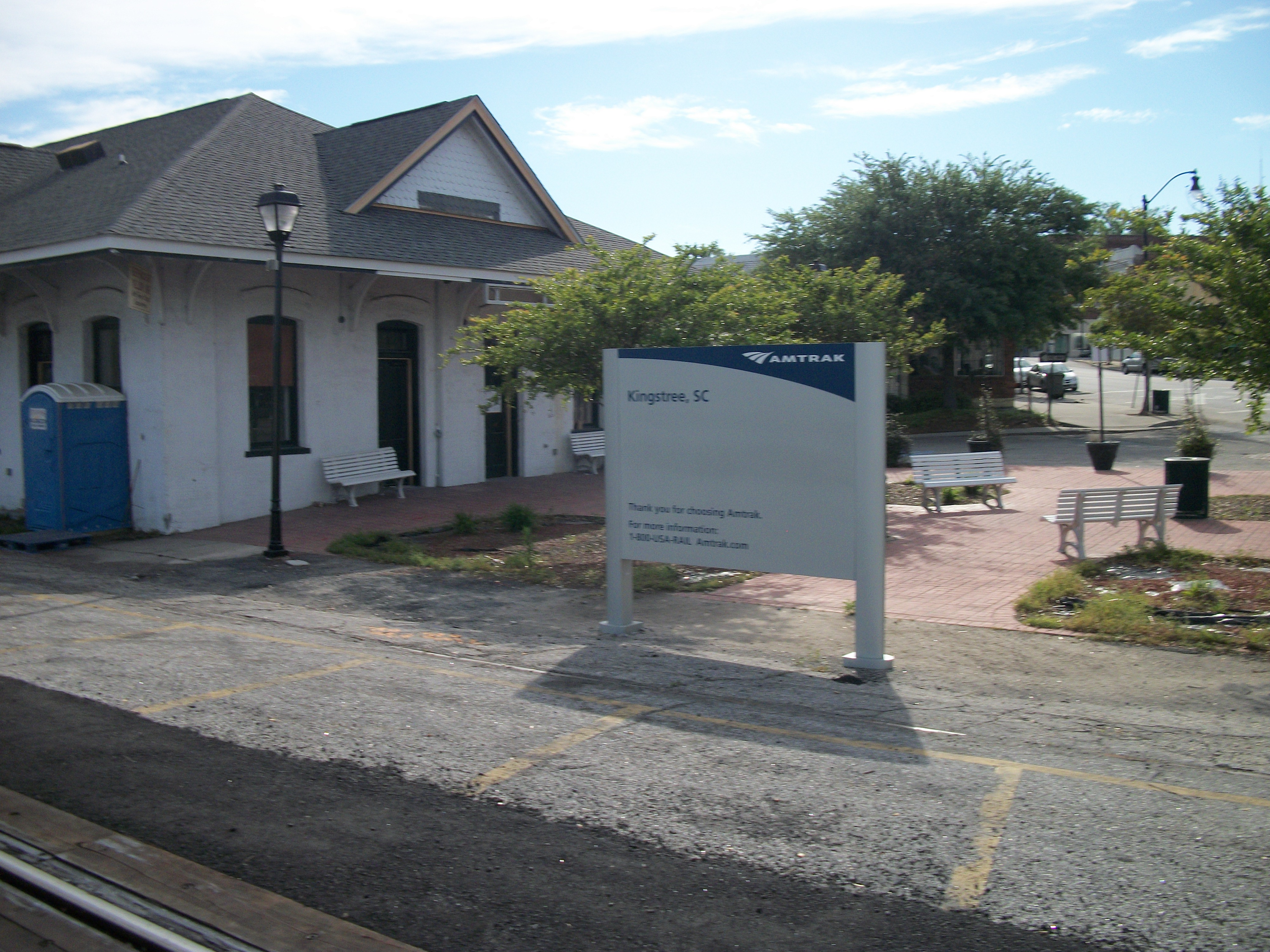
- Kingstree station under restoration in April 2011.

General information
- Location: 101 East Main Street (SC 261); Kingstree, South Carolina; United States
- Coordinates: 33.6637°N 79.8291°W
- Owner: City of Kingstree
- Line: Charleston Subdivision
- Platforms: 1 side platform
- Tracks: 2

Construction
- Parking: Yes

Other information
- Station code: Amtrak: KTR

History
- Opened: 1909

Passengers
- FY 2025: 10,184 (Amtrak)

Services
| Preceding station | Amtrak | Following station |
|---|---|---|
| Charleston toward Savannah | Palmetto | Florence toward New York |
| Charleston toward Miami | Silver Meteor | Florence toward New York |
Auto Train does not stop here
Former services
| Preceding station | Atlantic Coast Line Railroad | Following station |
|---|---|---|
| Salters toward Tampa | Main Line | Lake City toward Richmond |
- Kingstree Amtrak Station
- U.S. Historic district – Contributing property
- Part of: Kingstree Historic District (ID82003906)
- MPS: Kingstree MRA
- Added to NRHP: June 28, 1982
Location

Kingstree station is a train station in Kingstree, South Carolina, operated by Amtrak, the United States' railroad passenger system. It was originally built by the Atlantic Coast Line Railroad in 1909. The station survived the merger of the Atlantic Coast Line and Seaboard Air Line Railroads into the Seaboard Coast Line Railroad in 1967, only to terminate passenger service in 1971. Amtrak service to Kingstree began on June 15, 1976, with the introduction of the Palmetto. The station is currently part of the Kingstree Historic District.

The two tracks at Kingstree station cross the intersection of East Main Street (SC 261) and Hampton Avenue. Four streets named "Railroad Avenue" run along the tracks near the station. South Railroad Avenue on the west side of the tracks is on the corner of the station house itself, while South Railroad Avenue on the east side of the tracks is a dead end street running south of Ashton Avenue. On the north side of East Main Street, North Railroad Avenue on the west side of the tracks begins at Hampton Avenue just north of its southern terminus with East Main Street, while North Railroad Avenue on the east side begins at East Main Street itself.
