= Flint Rhem =

American baseball player (1901–1969)

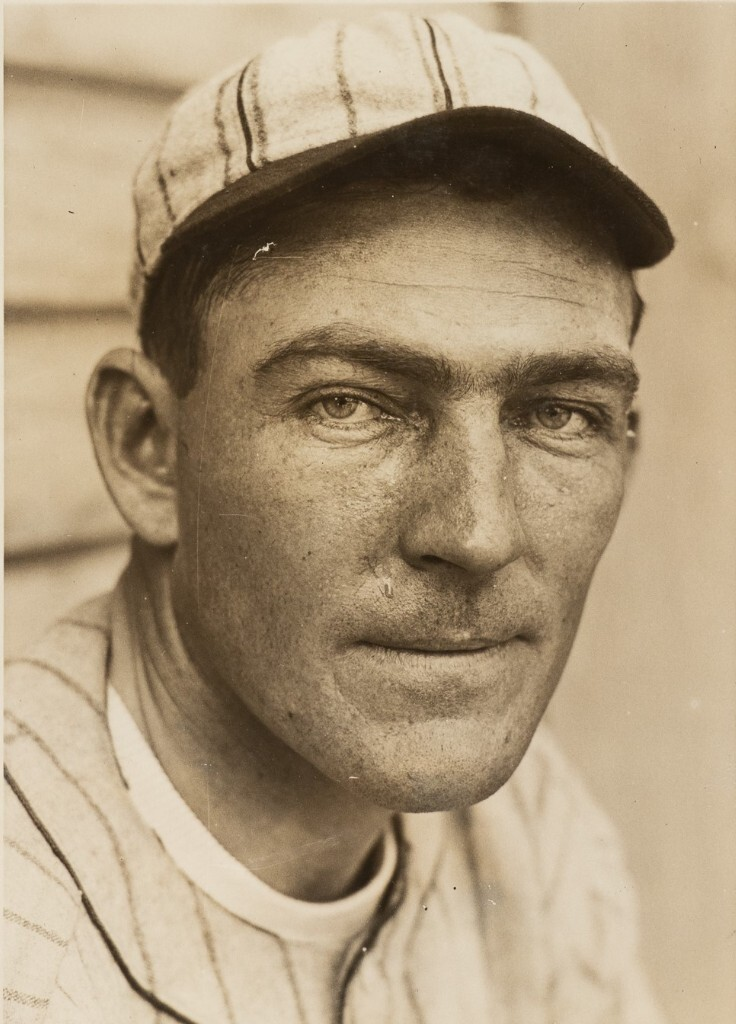
- Rhem c. 1930s
- Pitcher
- Born: January 24, 1901; Rhems, South Carolina, U.S.
- Died: July 30, 1969 (aged 68); Columbia, South Carolina, U.S.
- Batted: Right Threw: Right

MLB debut
- September 6, 1924, for the St. Louis Cardinals

Last MLB appearance
- August 26, 1936, for the St. Louis Cardinals

MLB statistics
- Win–loss record: 105–97
- Earned run average: 4.20
- Strikeouts: 529
- Stats at Baseball Reference

Teams
- St. Louis Cardinals (1924–1928, 1930–1932); Philadelphia Phillies (1932–1933); St. Louis Cardinals (1934); Boston Braves (1934–1935); St. Louis Cardinals (1936)

Career highlights and awards
- 2× World Series champion (1926, 1931); NL wins leader (1926)

Charles Flint Rhem (January 24, 1901 – July 30, 1969), born in Rhems, South Carolina, was an American pitcher for the St. Louis Cardinals (1924–28, 1930–32, 1934 and 1936), Philadelphia Phillies (1932–33) and Boston Braves (1934–35).

== Baseball career ==
Before his professional career, Rhem played for the Clemson Tigers baseball team (1922–24).

He finished 8th in voting for the 1926 National League MVP for having a 20–7 win–loss record, 34 games, 34 games started, 20 complete games, 1 shutout, 258 innings pitched, 241 hits allowed, 121 runs allowed, 92 earned runs allowed, 12 home runs allowed, 75 walks allowed, 72 strikeouts, 1 hit batsmen, 5 wild pitches, 1,068 batters faced, 1 balk and a 3.21 ERA. During the 1932 season, Rhem would be traded to the Philadelphia Phillies.

Rehm helped the Cardinals win the 1926, 1931, and 1934 World Series and the 1928 and 1930 National League pennants.

== Career statistics ==
In 12 seasons he had a 105–97 win–loss record, 294 games, 229 games started, 91 complete games, 8 shutouts, 41 games finished, 10 saves, 1,725 1/3 innings pitched, 1,958 hits allowed, 989 runs allowed, 805 earned runs allowed, 113 home runs allowed, 529 walks allowed, 534 strikeouts, 20 hit batsmen, 33 wild pitches, 7,516 batters faced, 4 balks and a 4.20 ERA.

== Death ==
Rhem died in Columbia, South Carolina, at the age of 68.

== See also ==
- List of Major League Baseball annual wins leaders
