= Black Mingo Creek =

- Location of the mouth of Black Mingo Creek in South Carolina

Location
- Country: United States
- State: South Carolina
- Counties: Williamsburg, Georgetown

Physical characteristics
- Source
  - location: Georgetown County
  - coordinates: 33°43′01″N 79°36′54″W
- Mouth: Black River
  - location: Williamsburg County
  - coordinates: 33°33′12″N 79°23′29″W

Black Mingo Creek is a tributary of the Black River in coastal South Carolina. The creek derives its name from the Mingo, a tribe that once inhabited the fork made by the junction of Indiantown Swamp and Black Mingo Creek.

It is a blackwater river: the presence of tannin gives it the color of tea. The river is relatively untouched by modern development, and is mostly surrounded by wetlands of cypress and tupelo with the adjacent higher lands mostly used for conventional agriculture or tree farming. The waters are a favorite fishing site for largemouth bass and panfish. Beavers are abundant, as well as great blue herons, songbirds and crows. Occasionally a bald eagle can be sighted. Alligators are also present.

The creek drains communities around Indiantown, Nesmith, and the communities of Rome and Rose Hill.

== History ==
The lower region is a deep tidal river, navigable by colonial-era ships to the former community of Willtown (later called Black Mingo, near Rhems), about halfway up the length of the creek. This village once did a thriving business exporting agricultural products such as the indigo plant, which was grown in the area and exported to Britain for use as a dye. After the American Revolution, the British market was closed to American exports, and the resulting loss of commerce led to the dwindling of the Willtown community. After the Georgetown District was split into Georgetown and Williamsburgh counties in 1804, Willtown became isolated on the outer edge of two counties.

The decision by the state in 1811 to build the creek bridge for the main north-south road about a mile downstream of Willtown accelerated the village's decline. Today, very little evidence is visible that there was ever a village there.

The area is part of the proposed Francis Marion Trail as it has the site of the Battle of Black Mingo of the American Revolution, which routed the British from their attempt to fortify and hold the area.

== Notable resident ==
Charles Flint Rhem (January 24, 1901 – July 30, 1969), born in Rhems, South Carolina, was a professional baseball player and pitcher for the St. Louis Cardinals (1924–28, 1930–32, 1934 and 1936), Philadelphia Phillies (1932–33) and Boston Braves (1934-35).

He helped the Cardinals win the World Series in 1926, 1931, and 1934, and the National League Pennants in 1928 and 1930.

He finished 8th in voting for the 1926 National League MVP for having a 20-7 win–loss record, 34 games, 34 games started, 20 complete games, 1 shutout, 258 innings pitched, 241 hits allowed, 121 runs allowed, 92 earned runs allowed, 12 home runs allowed, 75 walks allowed, 72 strikeouts, 1 hit batsmen, 5 wild pitches, 1068 batters faced, 1 balk, and a 3.21 ERA.

In 12 seasons he had a 105–97 win-loss record, 294 games, 229 games started, 91 complete games, 8 shutouts, 41 games finished, 10 saves, 1,725 1/3 innings pitched, 1,958 hits allowed, 989 runs allowed, 805 earned runs allowed, 113 home runs allowed, 529 walks allowed, 534 strikeouts, 20 hit batsmen, 33 wild pitches, 7516 batters faced, 4 balks, and a 4.20 ERA.

He died in Columbia, South Carolina, at the age of 68.
