= Colonel John Gotea Pressley House =

Historic house in South Carolina, United States

- U.S. National Register of Historic Places
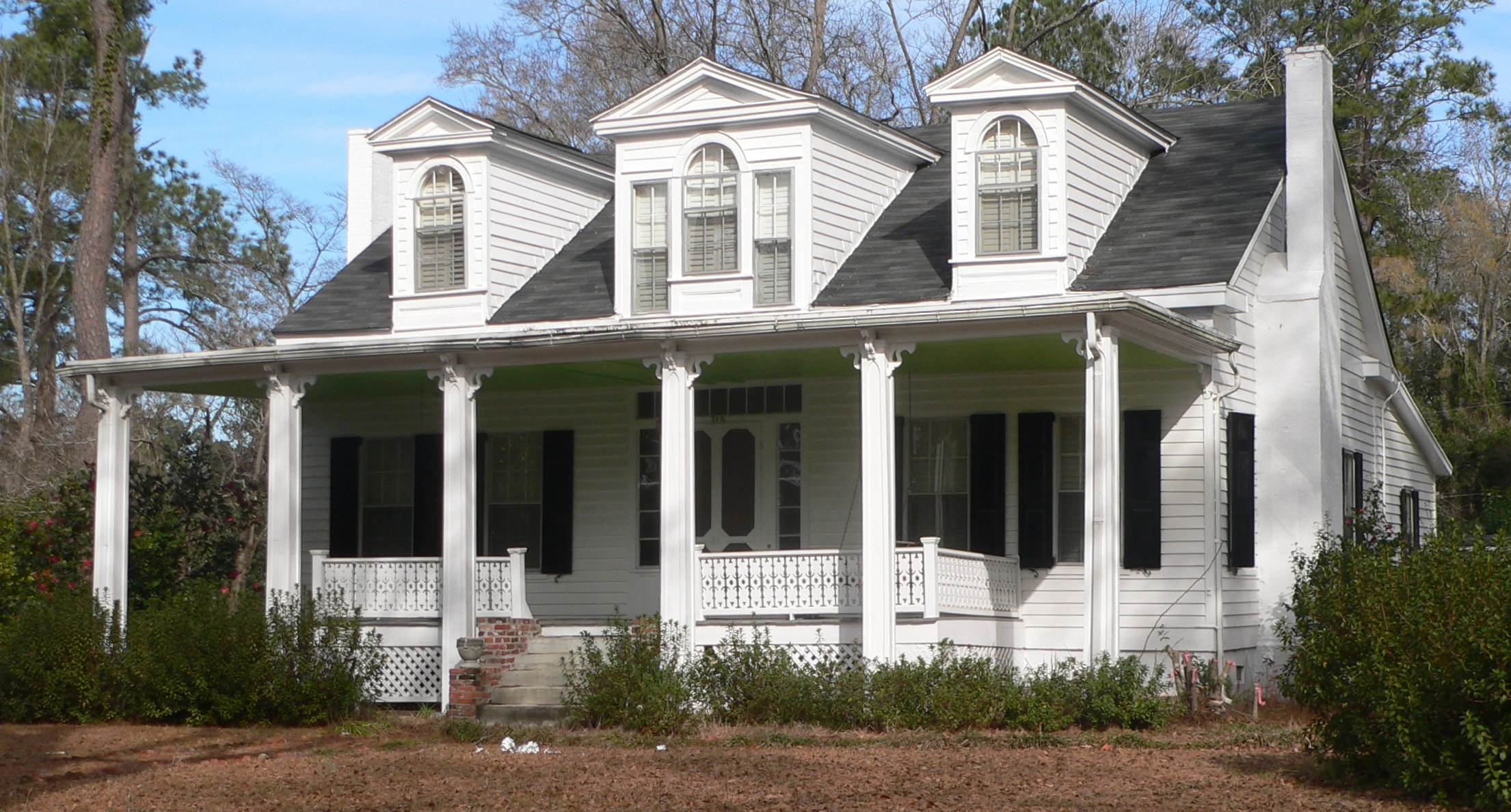
- Colonel John Gotea Pressley House, January 2013

- Location within South Carolina Location within the United States
- Location: 216 N. Academy St., Kingstree, South Carolina
- Coordinates: 33°40′17″N 79°50′8″W
- Area: 1 acre (0.40 ha)
- Built: 1855
- Architectural style: Greek Revival
- MPS: Kingstree MRA
- NRHP reference No.: 97000534
- Added to NRHP: June 10, 1997

Colonel John Gotea Pressley House, also known as the Pressley-Hirsch-Green House and Wylma M. Green House is a historic home located at Kingstree, Williamsburg County, South Carolina. It was built in 1855, and is a 1 1/2-story, weatherboard-clad Greek Revival style frame dwelling. The front facade features a “rain porch” and a dormer with a Palladian window. It was the home of Colonel John Gotea Pressley, a prominent local attorney, judge, and Confederate regimental field officer. It was listed in the National Register of Historic Places in 1997.

Pressley was born May 24, 1833.
