= Indiantown, South Carolina =

- Unincorporated community
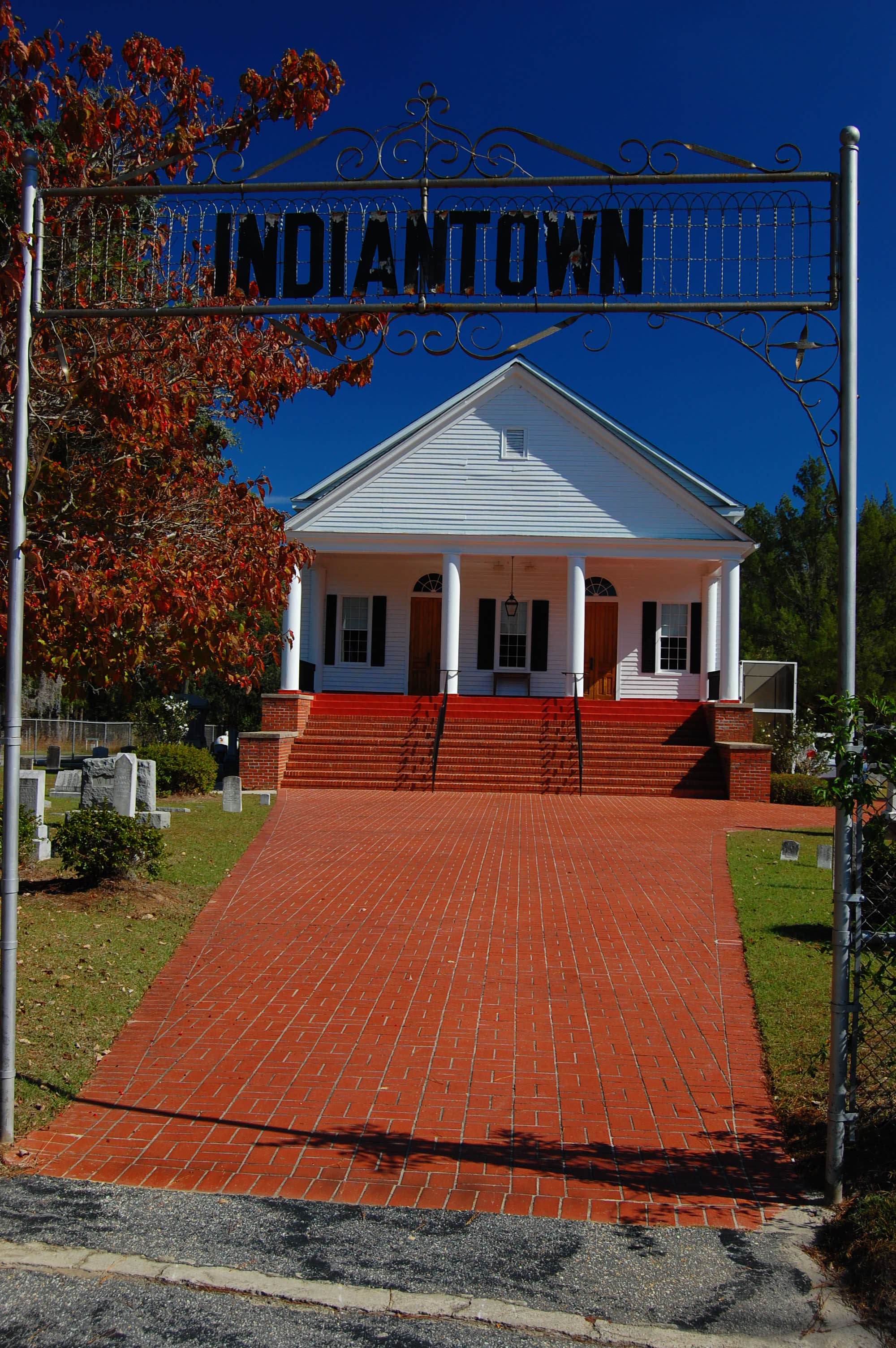
- Indiantown Presbyterian Church

- Location within South Carolina Location within the United States
- Coordinates: 33°43′29″N 79°33′40″W
- Country: United States
- State: South Carolina
- County: Williamsburg
- Elevation: 30 ft (9.1 m)
- Time zone: UTC-5 (Eastern (EST))
  - Summer (DST): UTC-4 (EDT)
- ZIP code: 29554
- Area codes: 843, 854
- GNIS feature ID: 1246122

Indiantown is an unincorporated community in rural Williamsburg County, South Carolina, United States. Prior to the arrival of Europeans to North America, it was the site of a historic Native American village.

The Native American tribes recorded as living in Williamsburg County, South Carolina, were the Wee Tee, the Wee Nee (Winyaw), and the Mingo tribes.

Early Scots-Irish immigrants developed a settlement around the Indiantown Presbyterian Church (founded 1757), and some of the local Native Americans converted to Christianity. During the American Revolution, the church was burned by British forces under the command of Lieutenant-Colonel Banastre Tarleton. His act resulted in the citizens giving greater support to his opponent, the Continental Army officer Francis Marion.

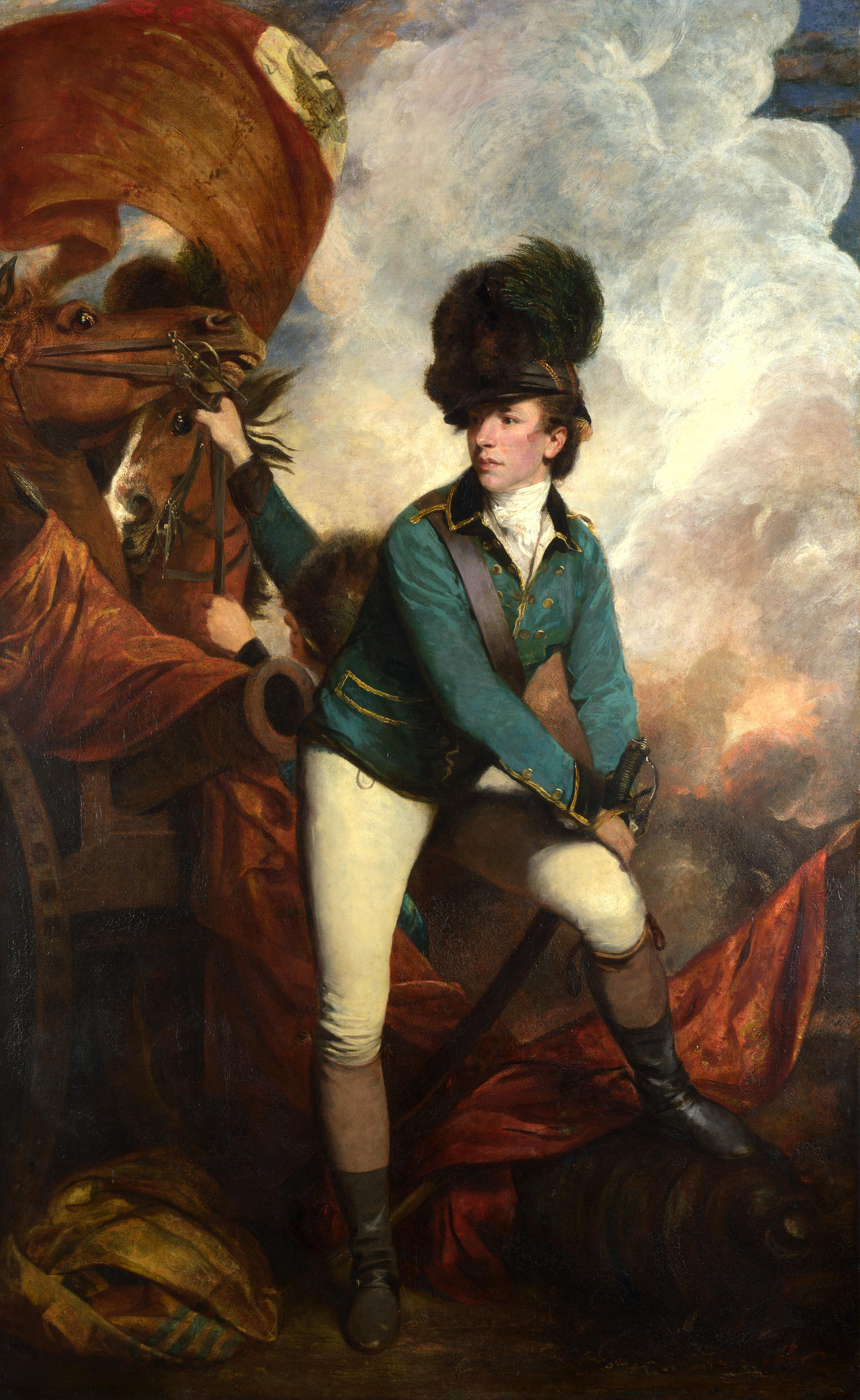
Portrait of Banastre Tarleton by Sir Joshua Reynolds

The Indiantown Church is still the center of the community. A number of Revolutionary soldiers are buried in its church yard. The church purchased the buildings and grounds of the closed Indiantown School, which have been used for athletic and cultural events in the community. It operates a day care center as well.

The community no longer has a post office and is mostly within the address of Hemingway, South Carolina.

== See also ==
- Early history of Williamsburg, South Carolina
- National Register of Historic Places listings in Williamsburg County, South Carolina
