= Thorntree (Kingstree, South Carolina) =

Historic house in South Carolina, United States

- U.S. National Register of Historic Places
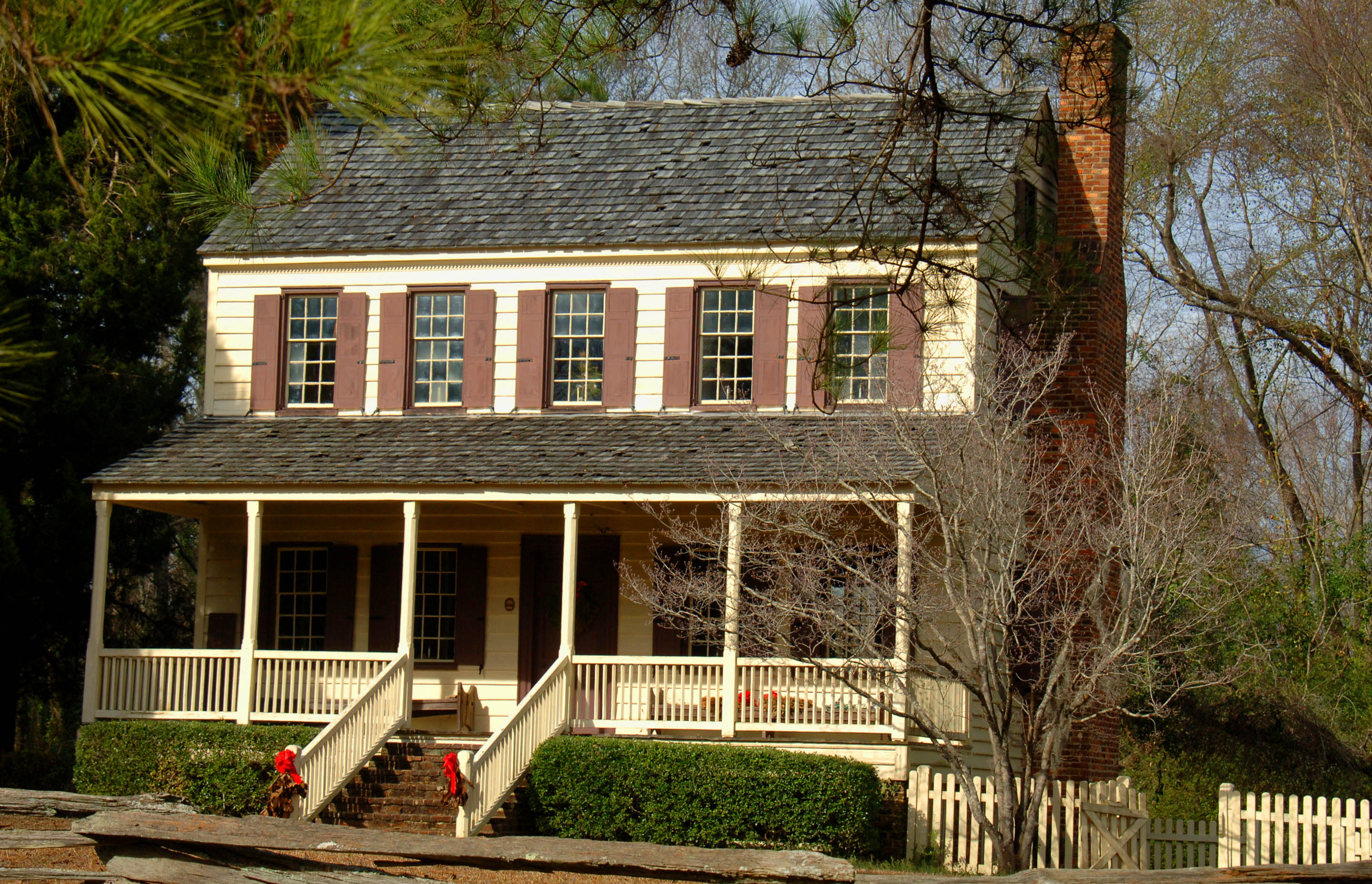
- Thorntree, January 2007

- Location within South Carolina Location within the United States
- Location: SC 527, in Fluitt-Nelson Memorial Park, Kingstree, South Carolina
- Coordinates: 33°39′44″N 79°49′35″W
- Area: 15.1 acres (6.1 ha)
- Built: 1749
- Built by: Witherspoon, James
- NRHP reference No.: 70000606
- Added to NRHP: October 28, 1970

Thorntree, also known as the Witherspoon House, is a historic plantation house located at Kingstree, Williamsburg County, South Carolina. It was built in 1749 by immigrant James Witherspoon (1700-1765), and is a two-story, five-bay, frame "I-house" dwelling with a hall and parlor plan and exterior end chimneys. It features full-length piazzas on the front and rear elevations. To preserve it, the house was moved from an inaccessible rural site to Kingstree on land donated as a memorial park, known as Fluitt-Nelson Memorial Park. The house has been restored to its 18th-century appearance and is open to the public by appointment with the Williamsburg Historical Society.

It was listed in the National Register of Historic Places in 1970.
