= Sonoma County Superior Court =

California superior court with jurisdiction over Sonoma Country

Superior Court of California, County of Sonoma
- Interactive map of Superior Court of California, County of Sonoma
- 39.52018°N 122.20027°W
- Established: 1891
- Jurisdiction: Sonoma County, California
- Location: Santa Rosa
- Coordinates: 39.52018°N 122.20027°W
- Appeals to: California Court of Appeal for the First District
- Website: sonoma.courts.ca.gov

Presiding Judge
- Currently: Hon. Christopher M. Honigsberg

Assistant Presiding Judge
- Currently: Hon. Mark A. Urioste

Court Executive Officer
- Currently: Robert M. Oliver

The Superior Court of California, County of Sonoma, informally known as the Sonoma County Superior Court, is the California superior court with jurisdiction over Sonoma County.

== History ==
Sonoma County was one of the original counties formed in 1850 after California became a state.

The county seat was originally in the city of Sonoma; the first transaction regarding a courthouse building in the Court of Sessions was on March 18, 1850, to settle the rent for the building, owned by Judge H. A. Green. Later, it was decided to purchase the building, which was occupied by the court until it left Sonoma for the new county seat of Santa Rosa, following a vote in 1854. The Sonoma courthouse was not well loved; the local Sonoma Bulletin warned in February 1854 "our worthy officers of the law ... run the risk of being crushed beneath a mass of mud and shingles, for we really believe it will cave in the next heavy rain" and a grand jury report called it "an old dilapidated adobe of small dimensions, in part roofless and unfit for a cattle shed".

Local business owners from Santa Rosa met with the county board of supervisors and promised to have a courthouse ready by November 3, 1854, which was the final condition to remove the county seat to Santa Rosa. The Bulletin editorialized "We are only sorry they did not take the Court-house along—not because it would be an ornament to Santa Rosa, but because its removal would have embellished our plan. Alas! old casa de adobe". The Court of Sessions, presided over by Judge Frank W. Shattuck, held its first meeting in Santa Rosa on October 2, 1854, at the old Masonic Hall. The first courthouse in Santa Rosa was completed in December 1854, at the corner of Fourth and Mendocino; at about the same time, land was donated for another courthouse and jail. The more permanent courthouse was built near the current Exchange Bank in downtown Santa Rosa.

Although the new courthouse and jail was ready on December 28, 1855, the county board of supervisors refused to accept it, and the contractor finally settled on February 8, 1856, accepting a payment of $10,400. The 1855 courthouse was expanded by adding a second story from 1859 to 1860, and again, the board disputed the contractor's invoice; although the original cost was $15,000, the final bill was $40,891.23 including "charges extra"; the final cost of the expansion was US$29,601.30 (equivalent to $1,036,000 in 2024).

1885 Courthouse

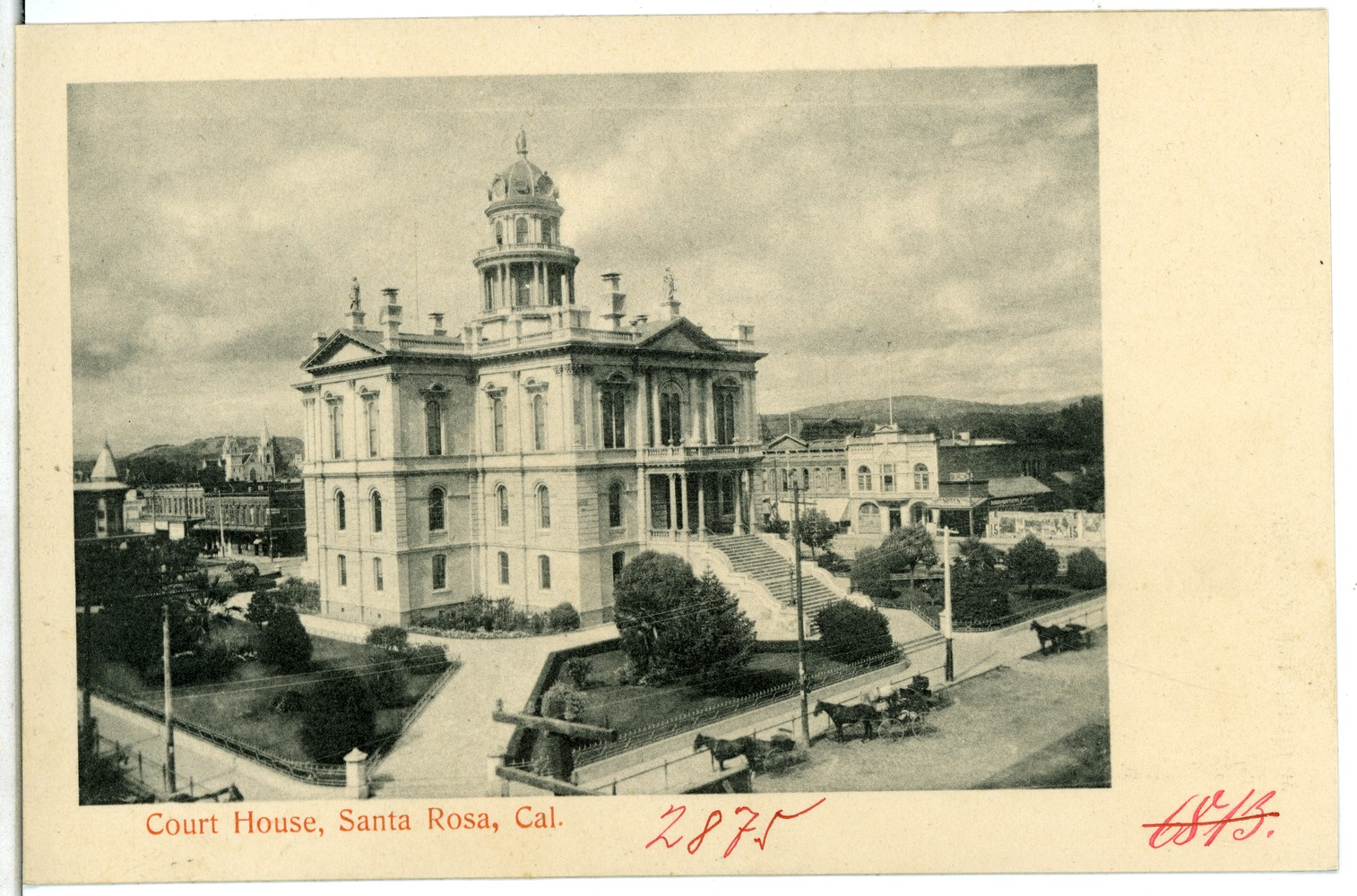
c. 1905

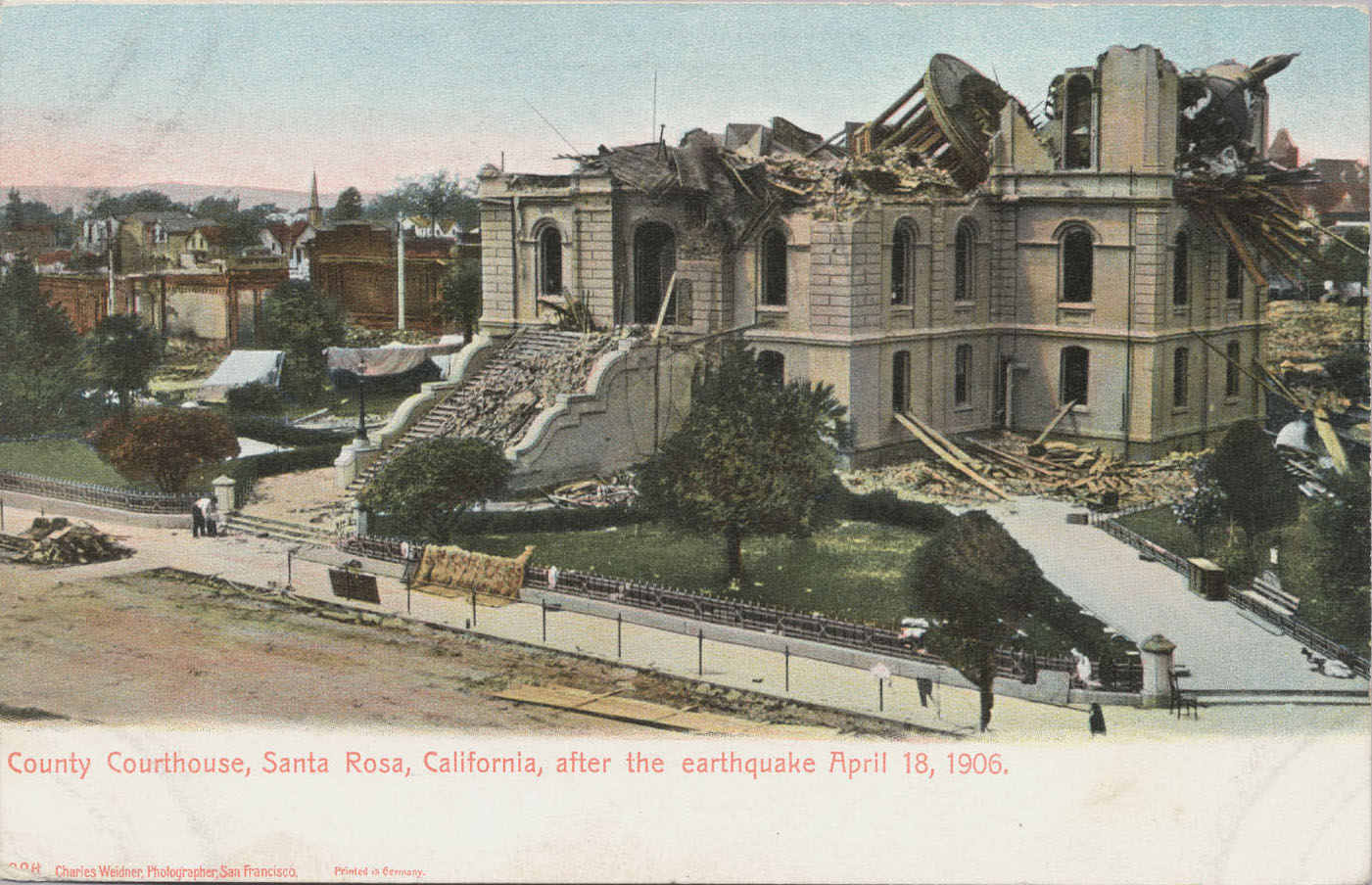
After the earthquake of 1906

After assuming his seat on the county board of supervisors in January 1883, T.J. Proctor of Santa Rosa immediately moved to construct a new courthouse in Santa Rosa; Petaluma countered a month later, proposing to donate Hill Plaza Park (now Penry Park) and $100,000 for construction of a new courthouse, provided the county seat be moved there instead. The tension between Santa Rosa and Petaluma grew to a point where Petalumans began circulating petitions to secede and form a new county.

In March, the mayor of Santa Rosa agreed to surrender the title for the land on which the new courthouse would be built, and with Petaluma failing to send a representative by April to discuss their proposal, plans proceeded for the new courthouse in Santa Rosa. The new courthouse was designed by Curtis & Bennett, and the construction contract was let for $80,000 to Carle & Crowley of Sacramento on September 2, 1883, with the condition that it be completed by January 1, 1885. The cornerstone for the new courthouse was laid on May 7, 1884, made of granite quarried from Rocklin; the ceremony was presided over by General Mariano G. Vallejo, considered to be the first person who settled in Sonoma County.

The courthouse, completed in 1885, measured 107 by 115 ft (33 by 35 m) in area, approximating a Greek cross; the four pediments were topped with statues of the Goddess of Justice, and a dome in the center, topped with a statue of Minerva. It was formally accepted on March 6, 1885, and proceedings began on April 3. The architects, Albert A. Bennett and John M. Curtis, would have a falling out over their share of the contract and dissolved their partnership shortly after it was completed; later county courthouses in Eureka (Curtis, 1889) and Auburn (Curtis, 1897) closely resembled their 1885 design for Sonoma County.

After the 1885 courthouse was destroyed in the 1906 San Francisco earthquake, a replacement was completed in 1910, designed by J.W. Dolliver. Following an earthquake in 1957, an examination of what was initially thought to be superficial damage to the building's fascia led to an estimate of $425,000 in needed repairs. The terra cotta cladding was stripped in 1958, and a consultant for the city recommended abandoning and selling the building. The 1910 replacement was demolished in 1966 after being declared seismically unsafe; the site was rededicated as "Old Courthouse Square" in 1967. The 1910 building, which had included a significant amount of reinforcing steel, was so sturdy the contractor hired to demolish it was unable to complete the razing within the 75-day window allotted.

Court operations moved to a new county center. The Sonoma County Hall of Justice was built between 1963 and 1965 to a design by J. Clarence Felciano & Associates.

For much of its history, the judiciary of Sonoma County was divided into two primary court systems- the Municipal Court and the Superior Court. The two courts would merge and be reorganized as a single Superior Court in 1996. Two years later, with the passage of Proposition 220 in 1998, the rest of California's counties who had not already merged their court systems would do the same.

After years of deterioration and maintenance concerns, it was announced that a new courthouse would be constructed adjacent to the current hall of justice. Construction on the project began in late 2021 and is expected to be completed in 2023.

== Venues ==
Sonoma County Superior Court locations:
1 Hall of Justice, 600 Administration Dr
2 Civil and Family, 3055 Cleveland Ave
Empire College Annex, 3035 Cleveland Ave
3 Juvenile Justice, 7425 Rancho Los Guilicos Rd
4 Old Courthouse Square (1885/1910 courthouse site)

The facilities for the Sonoma County Superior Court are all in the city of Santa Rosa. Three venues handle all adult cases, led by the Hall of Justice in the County Administration Center; juvenile cases are held separately at the Juvenile Justice Center.

== Judges ==
Current Sonoma County Superior Court Judges
Courtroom	Judge	Year Joined Court	Law School
1	Troye Shaffer	2021	UC Hastings
2	Vacant	N/A	N/A
3	Mark Urioste	2018	Lewis & Clark
4	Karlene Navarro	2021	University of San Francisco
5	Dana B. Simonds	2007	University of the Pacific
6	Laura Passaglia	2021	University of San Francisco
7	Vacant	N/A	N/A
8	Vacant	N/A	N/A
9	Robert M. LaForge	2010	Western State College of Law
10	Brad DeMeo	2010	Santa Clara University
11	Virginia G. Marcoida	2008	Santa Clara University
12	Vacant	N/A	N/A
13	Christopher Honigsberg	2018	University of San Francisco
14	Anthony Wheeldin	2011	UCLA
15	Shelly Averill	2010	Empire College
16	Patrick M. Broderick	2010	University of the Pacific
17	Arthur A. Wick	2006	Northrop University
18	Jennifer V. Dollard	2017	Southwestern
19	Gary Nadler	2002	University of San Francisco
20	Vacant	N/A	N/A
21	Peter Ottenweller	2010	UC Hastings
22	James G. Bertoli	2000	University of San Francisco
23	Lawrence Ornell	2013	Empire College
24	Kenneth J. Gnoss	2005	Western State College of Law
