= Nesmith, South Carolina =

Unincorporated community in South Carolina, US

Coordinates: 33°39′33″N 79°30′48″W

Nesmith is an unincorporated community in Williamsburg County, South Carolina, United States. It was a station on the Seaboard Air Line Railroad (now CSX Transportation) line which was built about 1912. Today it consists of a post office, fire station, and a country store, serving a large rural area which depends on agriculture and logging. Black Mingo Creek flows alongside the hamlet.

The community was named after the Nesmith family. The Gamble House was listed on the National Register of Historic Places in 2006.
