= Rhems, South Carolina =

- Unincorporated community
- Location within South Carolina Location within the United States
- Coordinates: 33°35′35″N 79°26′28″W
- Country: United States
- State: South Carolina
- County: Williamsburg, Georgetown
- Elevation: 33 ft (10 m)
- Time zone: UTC-5 (Eastern (EST))
  - Summer (DST): UTC-4 (EDT)
- ZIP code: 29440
- Area codes: 843, 854
- GNIS feature ID: 1227971

Rhems is an unincorporated community located on the boundary between Williamsburg County and Georgetown County, South Carolina, United States. It is centered around the intersection of County Line Road (SC 51), Rhems Road, and Browns Ferry Road (SC 41), not far from Black Mingo Creek, and just south of the historic Willtown site.

== History ==
Rhems was named for the Rhem family. Furnifold Rhem, Sr. (1820-1888) settled in this location in 1846 and acquired a large plantation. He founded F. Rhem Co., changing the name to F. Rhem & Sons Company in 1886 when he was joined by his two sons, Durward Dudley (1862-1922) and Furnifold, Jr. (1864-1918). The company grew and eventually included the production and sale of cotton, naval stores, turpentine, the Black River and Mingo Steamboat Co., Rhem Real Estate Co., Rhem Dock & Terminal Co., Rhem Timber and Land Co., and the Rhem Shingle Co.

== Geology ==
Rhems is the eponym of the Rhems Formation, a geologic formation of gray-black shale with seams of sand and mica, and fossils from the Paleogene period, located just to the east.

== Notable people ==
Charles Flint Rhem (January 24, 1901 - July 30, 1969), born in Rhems, South Carolina, was a professional baseball player and pitcher.
