= Scott House (Kingstree, South Carolina) =

Historic house in South Carolina, United States

- U.S. National Register of Historic Places
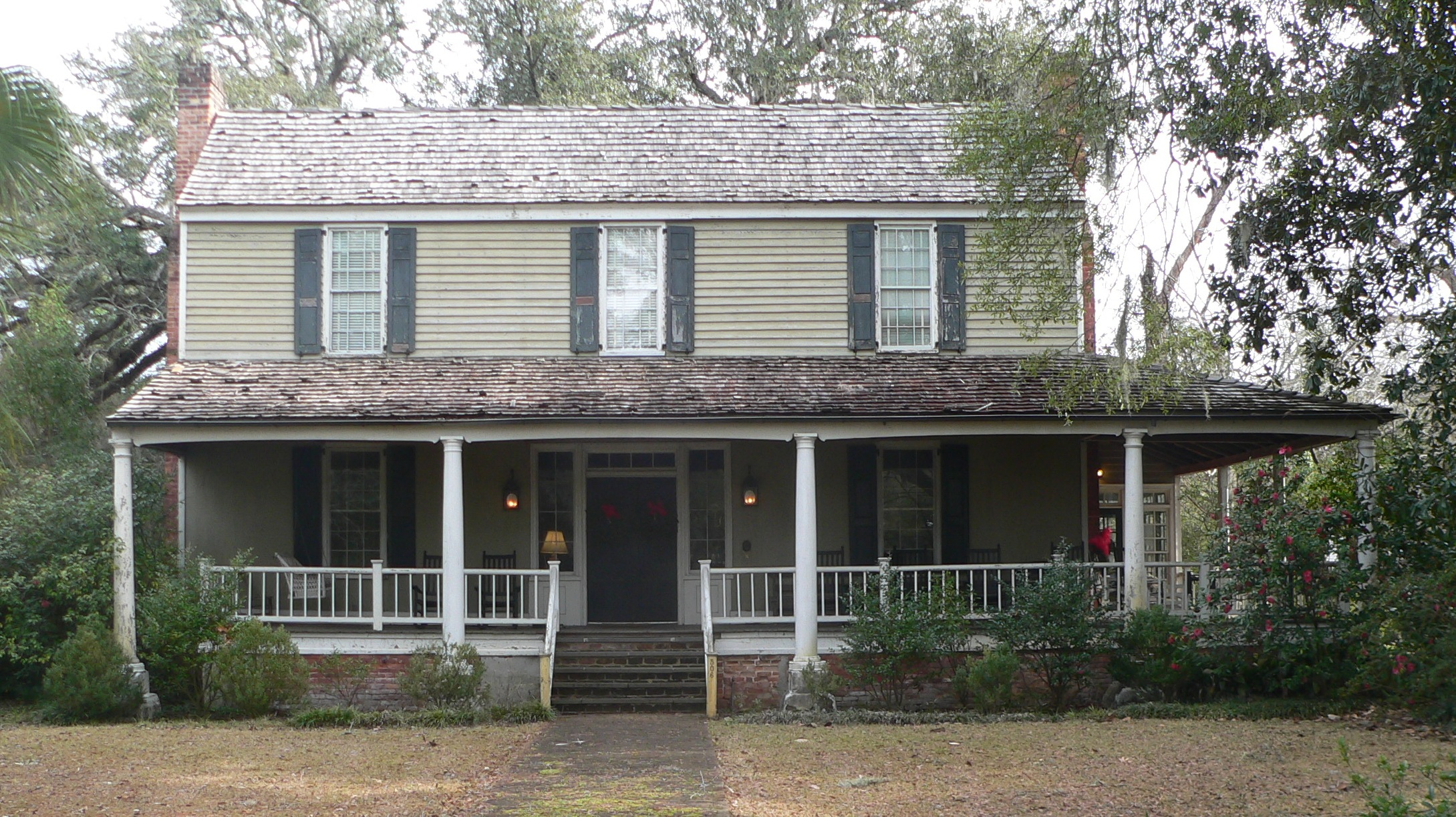
- Scott House, January 2013

- Location within South Carolina Location within the United States
- Location: 506 Live Oak St., Kingstree, South Carolina
- Coordinates: 33°40′17″N 79°44′54″W
- Area: 0.8 acres (0.32 ha)
- Built: c. 1843
- Built by: Scott, Joseph
- MPS: Kingstree MRA
- NRHP reference No.: 82004797
- Added to NRHP: June 28, 1982

Scott House, also known as the Scott-Hauenstein House, is a historic home located at Kingstree, Williamsburg County, South Carolina. It was built about 1843, and is a two-story, three-bay, frame building, sheathed in weatherboard, with a side-gabled roof and brick foundation. The front façade features a "Carolina" or "rain porch." Its builder was Joseph Scott, a wealthy planter, trustee of the Kingstree Academy, and politician. It is the oldest on-site house in Kingstree.

It was listed in the National Register of Historic Places in 1982.
