= McCollum-Murray House =

Historic house in South Carolina, United States

- U.S. National Register of Historic Places
- Location within South Carolina Location within the United States
- Location: C.E. Murray Blvd., Greeleyville, South Carolina
- Coordinates: 33°34′59″N 79°59′33″W
- Area: 9.5 acres (3.8 ha)
- Built: c. 1906
- Built by: George Whack
- Architectural style: Late Victorian, Classical Revival
- NRHP reference No.: 06000579
- Added to NRHP: July 11, 2006

McCollum-Murray House, also known as the C. E. Murray House, is a historic home located at Greeleyville, Williamsburg County, South Carolina. Built c. 1906, the house was the home of African-American educator Dr. Charles Edward Murray, and is an example of transitional folk Victorian and Classical Revival residential architecture. It was originally a two-story, T-shaped dwelling. It features a wraparound one-story porch. It has a single-story rear gabled addition, with another single-story shed-roofed addition built in the 1950s.

It was listed in the National Register of Historic Places in 2006.
