= Kingstree Historic District =

Historic district in South Carolina, United States

- U.S. National Register of Historic Places
- U.S. Historic district
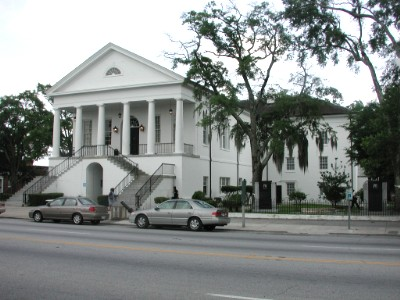
- Williamsburg County Courthouse, Designed by Robert Mills

- Location within South Carolina Location within the United States
- Location: Main, Hampton and Academy Streets; Kingstree, South Carolina
- Coordinates: 33°39′49″N 79°49′51″W
- Area: 10 acres (4.0 ha)
- Architectural style: Roman Classicism
- MPS: Kingstree MRA
- NRHP reference No.: 82003906 (original); 100012295 (increase)

Significant dates
- Added to NRHP: June 28, 1982
- Boundary increase: September 24, 2025

The Kingstree Historic District contains forty-eight properties situated along Main Street, Academy Street, and Hampton Street in the commercial area of downtown Kingstree, South Carolina. The district includes the courthouse, public library, railroad station, and numerous commercial buildings. The district is a fine collection of nineteenth-century vernacular commercial architecture. Details such as arched doorways and windows, cast-iron columns and pilasters, decorative or corbelled brickwork and pressed tin interior ceilings are present on most of the district's buildings. The Williamsburg County Courthouse, built ca. 1823, and designed by Robert Mills, is a fine example of Roman neoclassical design with its raised first floor, pediment with lunette, and Doric columns. In 1953-54 the courthouse underwent substantial remodeling on the exterior and interior, though it still reflects much of Mill's original design. With the exception of the courthouse, most of the buildings in the district were built between 1900 and 1920 when Kingstree enjoyed prosperity as a retail and tobacco marketing center of Williamsburg County. The majority of the buildings in the district are a visible record of this twenty-year growth and the historic fabric of the area remains substantially intact. The Kingstree Historic District was listed in the National Register of Historic Places June 28, 1982.
