= M. F. Heller House =

Historic house in South Carolina, United States

- U.S. National Register of Historic Places
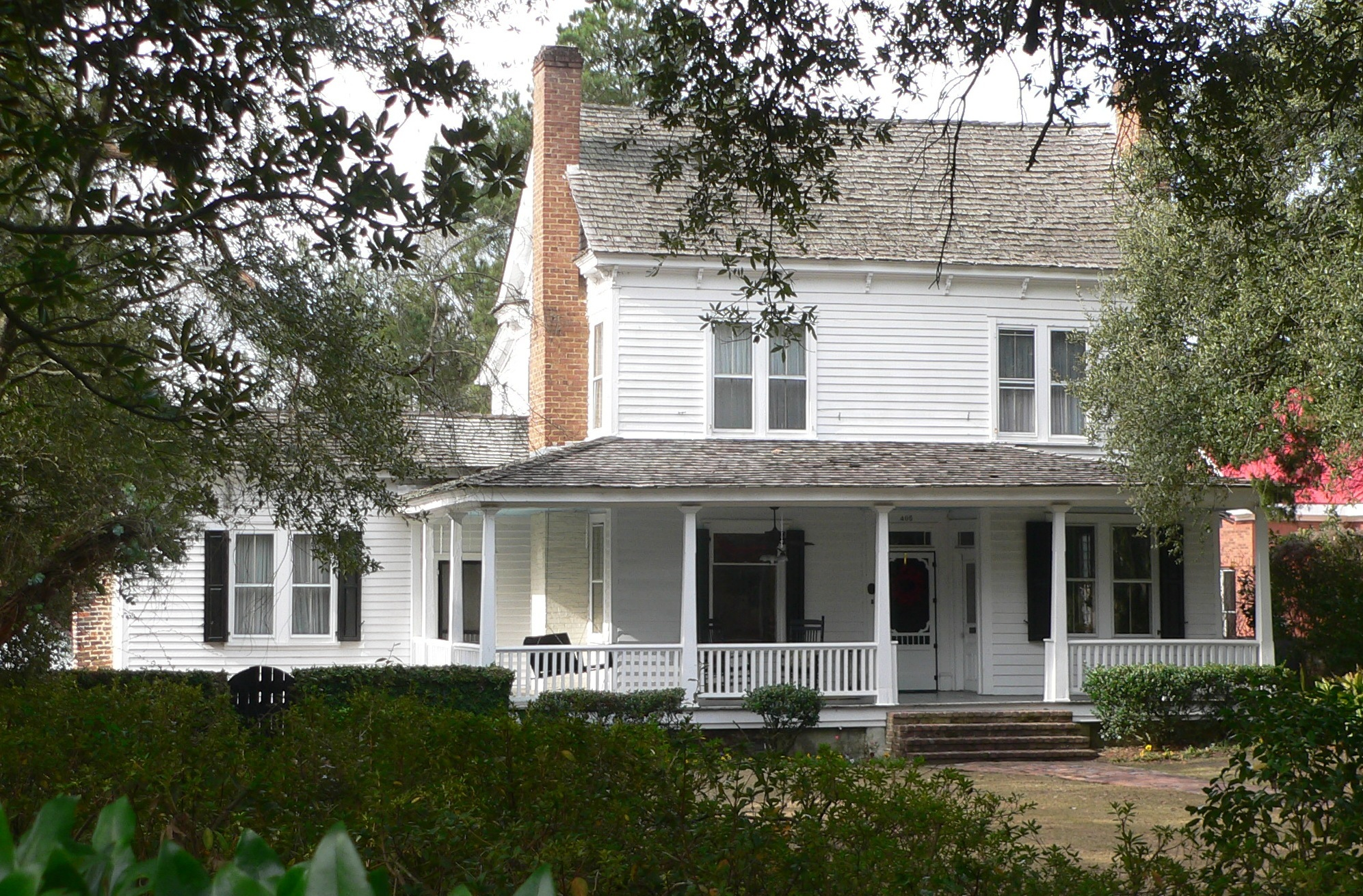
- M. F. Heller House, January 2013

- Location within South Carolina Location within the United States
- Location: 405 Academy St., Kingstree, South Carolina
- Coordinates: 33°40′4″N 79°49′57″W
- Area: less than one acre
- Built: c. 1845, c. 1895
- Architectural style: Late Victorian, Mid 19th Century Revival
- MPS: Kingstree MRA
- NRHP reference No.: 94000452
- Added to NRHP: May 19, 1994

M. F. Heller House, also known as the Arrowsmith House and Old Methodist Church Parsonage, is a historic home located at Kingstree, Williamsburg County, South Carolina. It was built about 1845 and enlarged about 1895 to a substantial two-story Late Victorian residence. It is a two-story, lateral-gabled residence, sheathed in weatherboard and set on a stuccoed brick pier foundation. It is the only antebellum residence built within the original limits of Kingstree.

It was listed on the National Register of Historic Places in 1994.
