= Greeleyville, South Carolina =

- Town
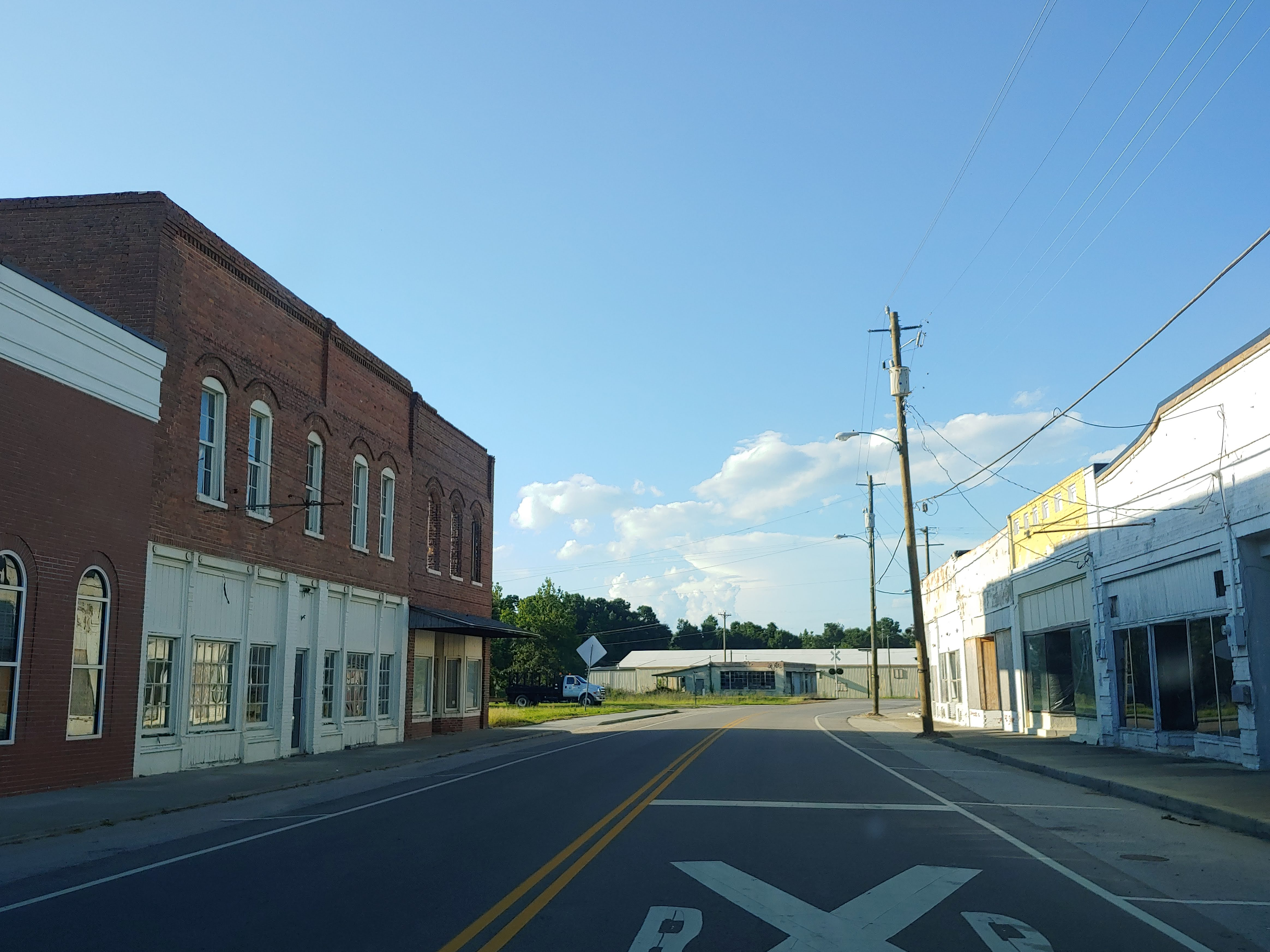
- Downtown Greeleyville, SC

- Seal

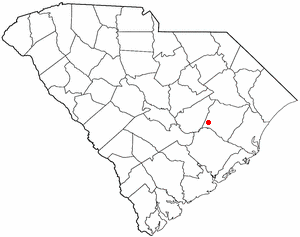
- Location of Greeleyville, South Carolina
- Coordinates: 33°34′58″N 79°59′48″W
- Country: United States
- State: South Carolina
- County: Williamsburg
- Incorporated: December 20, 1893

Area
  - Total: 1.22 sq mi (3.17 km^{2})
  - Land: 1.22 sq mi (3.17 km^{2})
  - Water: 0 sq mi (0.00 km^{2})
- Elevation: 79 ft (24 m)

Population (2020)
  - Total: 384
  - Density: 313.9/sq mi (121.18/km^{2})
- Time zone: UTC-5 (Eastern (EST))
  - Summer (DST): UTC-4 (EDT)
- ZIP code: 29056
- Area codes: 843, 854
- FIPS code: 45-30535
- GNIS feature ID: 2406609
- Website: townofgreeleyville.com

Greeleyville is a town in Williamsburg County, South Carolina, United States. The population was 438 at the 2010 census. The town was originally chartered on December 20, 1893. Greeleyville's seal and flag feature a depiction of the first Town Hall, which was built in the 1890s, as well as two arms, one black and one white, holding a tobacco leaf and a cotton boll. These symbols represent the unity and cooperation among all the people of Greeleyville and pay tribute to the town's agricultural heritage.

Since 1982, the town has hosted an annual Flag Day celebration each Memorial Day weekend that features bingo, street dances, barbecue, as well as various other types of vendors.

== History ==
The area surrounding Greeleyville was once home to several Native American tribes, including the Wee Nee, Wee Tee, and Mingoes, who inhabited and utilized the region as hunting grounds into the eighteenth century. A remnant population of Native Americans, known as the Goins Indian Community, has lived just north of Greeleyville since the mid-nineteenth century, predating the town of Greeleyville. The community once maintained its own church and during the era of racial segregation, had a state-funded school that operated until 1949. The community today still exists and alleges to be descended from the Wee Nee, among other historic tribes of the Carolinas.

The settlement of Greeleyville traces back to the late nineteenth century, when Samuel J. Taylor, a veteran of the American Civil War, came to the present site of the town with his partner, S.J. Hudson. The two together bought several hundred acres of timber and began the manufacture of turpentine and rosin. Three years later Taylor bought out his partner and began to work with his brother-in-law, W.S. Varner. Taylor used his expertise in the mercantile industry to bring prosperity to the area and although his timber holdings became exhausted within the first fifteen years, opted to remain in the emerging town for both financial and sentimental reasons. Taylor owned 1,200 acres within present-day town limits and, in the pursuit of promoting a town community, would donate land to every industrious and capable man willing to build a home in the area. He also gave land freely for streets, churches, and schools within the town. Greeleyville obtained its name when Taylor, who was depending on the turpentine industry, had ordered a bill of goods for his store and was in need of an address. When Taylor, who was a staunch supporter of Horace Greeley, presented the idea of naming the town to local residents, the majority voted in favor of naming the town in honor of Greeley. It is local lore that Greeley once visited the town and became stranded there, while campaigning for presidency. On December 20, 1893, the town was officially chartered as Greeleyville.

Thomas Walter Boyle was a key figure in the development of Greeleyville during the early 20th century. He held several important positions in the town, including vice-president of the Mallard Lumber Company and president of the Bank of Greeleyville and the Greeleyville Land & Improvement Company. In 1904, Mallard Lumber Company had become the main enterprise of Greeleyville, shipping a variety of types of lumber north for sale. Boyle's efforts in local manufacturing, merchandising, and other fields significantly contributed to the growth and prosperity of Greeleyville. Before Boyle's arrival in 1886, the town was relatively small, with only a saw mill, a single store, and two dwelling houses. The nearest school and telegraph office were located several miles away in Foreston, South Carolina. Within thirty-five years, Greeleyville was characterized by various forms of industry and enterprise.

By the mid twentieth century, most sources of employment once available to residents of Greeleyville were no longer existent and this led many to begin seeking work in other communities throughout the state. In 1978, the town gained a medical center and four years later, in 1982, a pharmacy was opened on the site of the town's former mule and livery stable. The town's only chain grocery store, IGA, moved to a larger location with expanded parking in 1984. The store later closed and a Super G Foods Store opened in the same location before going out of business in 2008. During the twenty-first century, many shops once located in downtown Greeleyville became abandoned due to competition with big-box stores and other businesses located along nearby U.S. Highway 521.

On May 21, 2021, the town of Greeleyville gathered for the ribbon-cutting ceremony for the Jonte-Sabb Farmer's Market and Pavilion. The structure is named for senator Ronnie A. Sabb and the late Leonard Jonte, the former CEO and president of the Bank of Greeleyville, who died in 2008. Jonte devoted countless hours to preserving and bettering the town, having co-founded the Greeleyville Flag Day Festival and having served on the Greeleyville Beautification Committee. He also purchased the Varner House, the former home of Samuel J. Taylor, which is thought to be the oldest structure in the town, and opened it to the public as a museum housing historical memorabilia.

=== Burning of Mt. Zion AME Church ===
On the night of June 20, 1995, during a string of over thirty suspicious fires at African American churches between 1995 and 1996, Mount Zion AME Church was burned as the result of arson by two Ku Klux Klan members. President Bill Clinton traveled to Greeleyville in June 1996 to attend the dedication of the rebuilt church, vowing to enlist the full power of the federal government to put an end to the mass burnings of African American churches prevalent at the time. The church became a national symbol of arsons following Clinton's visit to Greeleyville.

=== Historic Sites ===
Locations listed on the National Register of Historic Places:

- The Clarkson Farm Complex
- The McCollum-Murray House
- New Market

== Geography ==
According to the United States Census Bureau, the town has a total area of 1.2 square miles (3.1 km^{2}), all of it land.

== Demographics ==
Historical population
Census	Pop.	Note	%±
1900	252		—
1910	630		150.0%
1920	645		2.4%
1930	474		−26.5%
1940	633		33.5%
1950	600		−5.2%
1960	504		−16.0%
1970	542		7.5%
1980	593		9.4%
1990	464		−21.8%
2000	452		−2.6%
2010	438		−3.1%
2020	384		−12.3%
U.S. Decennial Census

=== 2020 census ===
Greeleyville town, South Carolina – Racial and ethnic composition Note: the US Census treats Hispanic/Latino as an ethnic category. This table excludes Latinos from the racial categories and assigns them to a separate category. Hispanics/Latinos may be of any race.
Race / Ethnicity (NH = Non-Hispanic)	Pop 2000	Pop 2010	Pop 2020	% 2000	% 2010	% 2020
White alone (NH)	173	121	93	38.27%	27.63%	24.22%
Black or African American alone (NH)	263	295	268	58.19%	67.35%	69.79%
Native American or Alaska Native alone (NH)	0	0	0	0.00%	0.00%	0.00%
Asian alone (NH)	4	0	0	0.88%	0.00%	0.00%
Native Hawaiian or Pacific Islander alone (NH)	0	0	0	0.00%	0.00%	0.00%
Other race alone (NH)	0	1	1	0.00%	0.23%	0.26%
Mixed race or Multiracial (NH)	0	9	14	0.00%	2.05%	3.65%
Hispanic or Latino (any race)	12	12	8	2.65%	2.74%	2.08%
Total	452	438	384	100.00%	100.00%	100.00%

=== 2000 census ===
As of the census of 2009, there were 375 people, 163 households, and 118 families residing in the town. The population density was 390.7 inhabitants per square mile (150.9/km^{2}). There were 188 housing units at an average density of 162.5 per square mile (62.7/km^{2}). The racial makeup of the town was 39.82% White, 58.19% African American, 0.88% Asian, 1.11% from other races. Hispanic or Latino of any race were 2.65% of the population.

There were 163 households, out of which 36.8% had children under the age of 18 living with them, 48.5% were married couples living together, 19.6% had a female householder with no husband present, and 27.6% were non-families. 25.8% of all households were made up of individuals, and 11.0% had someone living alone who was 65 years of age or older. The average household size was 2.77 and the average family size was 3.34.

In the town, the population was spread out, with 31.2% under the age of 18, 7.7% from 18 to 24, 25.2% from 25 to 44, 23.2% from 45 to 64, and 12.6% who were 65 years of age or older. The median age was 36 years. For every 100 females, there were 89.9 males. For every 100 females age 18 and over, there were 92.0 males.

The median income for a household in the town was $32,375, and the median income for a family was $32,344. Males had a median income of $27,969 versus $17,500 for females. The per capita income for the town was $17,971. About 23.2% of families and 19.6% of the population were below the poverty line, including 20.8% of those under age 18 and 25.5% of those age 65 or over.

== Notable people ==
- Clifton Newman, judge of the South Carolina Circuit Court
- Joshua Rogers, gospel singer and winner of the fifth season of BET's Sunday Best

== See also ==
- Mount Zion AME Church (Greeleyville, South Carolina)
