= New Market (Greeleyville, South Carolina) =

- U.S. National Register of Historic Places
- U.S. Historic district
- Location within South Carolina Location within the United States
- Location: South Carolina Highway 375, approximately 5 miles south of Greeleyville, near Greeleyville, South Carolina
- Coordinates: 33°32′21″N 79°59′23″W
- Area: 88.6 acres (35.9 ha)
- Built: c. 1820
- Architectural style: extended Double Pen
- NRHP reference No.: 98000290
- Added to NRHP: March 26, 1998

New Market, also known as the McDonald-Rhodus-Lesesne House, is a historic home and national historic district located near Greeleyville, Williamsburg County, South Carolina. It encompasses 2 contributing buildings and 2 contributing sites. The house was built about 1820, and a one-story, frame extended Double Pen house over a raised brick basement. It features a typical "rain porch" on the front of the house supported by four tapered and chamfered wooden posts. Also on the property are a 1 1/2-story frame tobacco pack house (c. 1916), the foundation of a greenhouse, and a pecan avenue and grove (c. 1920).

It was listed on the National Register of Historic Places in 1998.
