= Gamble House (Williamsburg County, South Carolina) =

Historic house in South Carolina, United States

- U.S. National Register of Historic Places
- Location within South Carolina Location within the United States
- Location: West of Nesmith off South Carolina Highway 502, Nesmith, South Carolina
- Coordinates: 33°40′17″N 79°35′26″W
- Area: 0.4 acres (0.16 ha)
- NRHP reference No.: 78002535
- Added to NRHP: December 8, 1978

Gamble House is a historic farmhouse located near Nesmith, Williamsburg County, South Carolina. It dates to the early-19th century, and is a small wooden dwelling set upon brick piers with a steeply pitched gable roof. It consists of a central two-story core, with later additions of small one-story wings.

It was listed in the National Register of Historic Places in 1978.
