= Clarkson Farm Complex =

- U.S. National Register of Historic Places
- U.S. Historic district
- Location within South Carolina Location within the United States
- Location: U.S. Route 52, 1.5 miles south of its junction with U.S. Route 521, near Greeleyville, South Carolina
- Coordinates: 33°33′38″N 79°55′57″W
- Area: 9.9 acres (4.0 ha)
- Built: 1896
- Built by: Clarkson, William N.
- NRHP reference No.: 88001706
- Added to NRHP: October 6, 1988

Clarkson Farm Complex is a historic farm and national historic district located near Greeleyville, Williamsburg County, South Carolina. It encompasses 8 contributing buildings and 1 contributing site with buildings dating from about 1896 to 1928. They include the main house, store, smokehouse, garage, stable/garage, tenant house, pumphouse, wellhouse and pecan grove. The main house was built about 1905, and is a two-story, frame I-house on a brick pier foundation. The Clarkson Store was built about 1896, and is representative of one of few surviving rural commercial buildings. The pecan grove was planted in 1922.

It was listed on the National Register of Historic Places in 1988.
