= Rhems Formation =

Geologic formation in South Carolina, United States

- Stratigraphic range: Paleogene
- Type: Formation
- Unit of: Black Mingo Group

Lithology
- Primary: shale
- Other: sand

Location
- Region: South Carolina
- Country: United States

Type section
- Named for: Rhems, SC

The Rhems Formation, also called the Rhems Shale, is a geologic formation in South Carolina. The Rhems Formation is considered part of the Black Mingo Group. It was named after Rhems, SC which is located five miles from the type locality at Perkins Bluff. The unit is a light gray to black shale interlaminated with thin seams of fine-grained sand and mica with some layers partially silicified. It preserves fossils dating back to the Paleogene period.

== See also ==
- List of fossiliferous stratigraphic units in South Carolina
- Paleontology in South Carolina
