= Kingstree, South Carolina =

- City
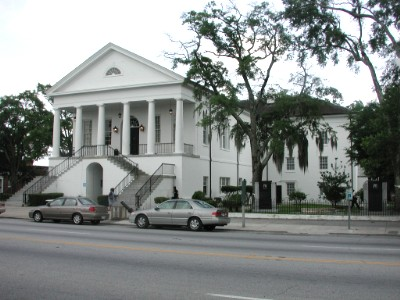
- Williamsburg County Courthouse

- Seal

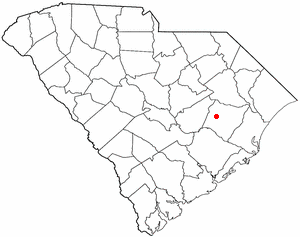
- Location in Williamsburg County, South Carolina
- Coordinates: 33°39′59″N 79°49′45″W
- Country: United States
- State: South Carolina
- County: Williamsburg

Government
  - Type: Mayor–council government

Area
  - Total: 3.20 sq mi (8.30 km^{2})
  - Land: 3.18 sq mi (8.24 km^{2})
  - Water: 0.023 sq mi (0.06 km^{2})
- Elevation: 59 ft (18 m)

Population (2020)
  - Total: 3,244
  - Density: 1,020.1/sq mi (393.85/km^{2})
- Time zone: UTC−5 (EST)
  - Summer (DST): UTC−4 (EDT)
- ZIP code: 29556
- Area codes: 843, 854
- FIPS code: 45-38590
- GNIS feature ID: 2405952
- Website: www.kingstree.org

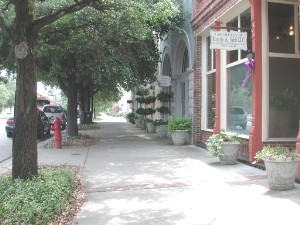
Main Street, Kingstree, South Carolina

Kingstree is a city in and the county seat of Williamsburg County, South Carolina, United States. The population was 3,328 at the 2010 census.

== History ==
The original town was laid out as Williamsburg by the Lords Proprietors in colonial times, but a lone, unusually large white pine was found along the Black River. Since tall white pines were ideal for use as masts for ships, it was claimed by the Crown on behalf of the king. The broad arrow mark was carved into the tree to prevent any colonists from cutting it. Though white pines are native to the Appalachians as far south as Georgia, it is the only tree of King George’s ever found in the South. Over time, the county kept the name Williamsburg, but the county seat became known as the King's Tree. In 1867 Twenty-two African-American prisoners were killed in a fire at the jail.

=== Battles ===
==== Battle of the Lower Bridge ====
General Francis Marion, known as the Swamp Fox, defeated the British at the Battle of the Lower Bridge in March 1781. A historical marker between US Highway 521 and the Black River denotes the battle.

==== Battle of King's Tree ====
After the British had captured Charles Town during the revolution, General Marion gained supporters from Major John James. The Battle of King's Tree took place on August 27, 1780. The city sustained losses, including Indiantown Presbyterian Church being burned to the ground.

=== Historical homes and buildings ===
The Kingstree Historic District, M.F. Heller House, Colonel John Gotea Pressley House, Scott House, and Thorntree are listed on the National Register of Historic Places.

==== Williamsburg Presbyterian Church ====
Williamsburg Presbyterian Church was founded in August 1736. The church consisted of three structures. Its founders built the first church in 1738 across from the Williamsburg Cemetery in town; the second building was constructed in 1828 and was across from the Williamsburg Cemetery as well. The third, the current structure of the church located on North Academy Street was built in 1914. The stained glass windows on the roof of the church today were imported from Austria. One of the stained glass windows on the roof was removed in 1989 during a renovation and was placed behind the pulpit of the sanctuary. The first person to be buried in the church cemetery was John Witherspoon(1670–1737), the father of James Witherspoon, builder of Thorntree.

Williamsburg Presbyterian Church celebrated its 275th Birthday in October 2011. The church held a service to share Kingstree's history. The church is the oldest church that still exists today between the Santee and Cape Fear Rivers in North and South Carolina. Williamsburg Presbyterian is the mother church to 33 other Presbyterian churches. Two daughter churches include nearby Union Presbyterian church in Salters, South Carolina, and Indiantown Presbyterian Church in Williamsburg County.

The Kingstree company formed at Williamsburg Presbyterian Church's original churchyard in July 1780. The company was led by Captain Henry Mouzon and later turned into the battalion and then formed a brigade led by Francis Marion against the British.

==== The Arnette House ====
The Arnette House is one of the three oldest homes in the town and was built in 1840. The home holds significance in the town because the dining room was used as a school for two periods of history during the early years of the home.

==== Thorntree House ====
Thorntree House is the oldest home in the lowcountry area of South Carolina. The early plantation home was constructed from native materials of South Carolina. James Witherspoon built the home in 1749 when the house was located six miles outside of town near where the Battle of the Lower Bridge took place. Witherspoon was a part of Francis Marion's brigade. After Witherspoon's death, Witherspoon's son inherited the plantation home. The British occupied the home during the revolution when it was at its original location, on the Black River. Gavin Witherspoon was the owner at the time. The house was later moved to its current location in 1969 when it was being restored by the Williamsburg Historical Society and is currently registered by the National Historic Register. The Williamsburg Historical Society moved the house into Kingstree city limits to provide protection by the city's police and fire department.

==== Williamsburg County Courthouse ====
The Williamsburg County Courthouse is located in the business district of Kingstree on Main Street. The original grounds of where the courthouse stands were the original parade grounds in the town of Kingstree and were used by the militia during the revolution. The courthouse was built in 1823 by Robert Mills, a nationally known architect who hailed from South Carolina. The second level of the courthouse suffered a fire in 1883 but because the walls were 30 inches thick and fireproof, the building was restored. Other changes and additions were added to the courthouse including parking for horses in 1901, and a third floor in 1954.

== Geography ==
According to the United States Census Bureau, the town has a total area of 3.2 square miles (8.3 km^{2}), of which 3.1 square miles (8.0 km^{2}) are land and 0.04 square miles (0.10 km^{2}) (0.63%) is covered by water.

=== Rivers ===
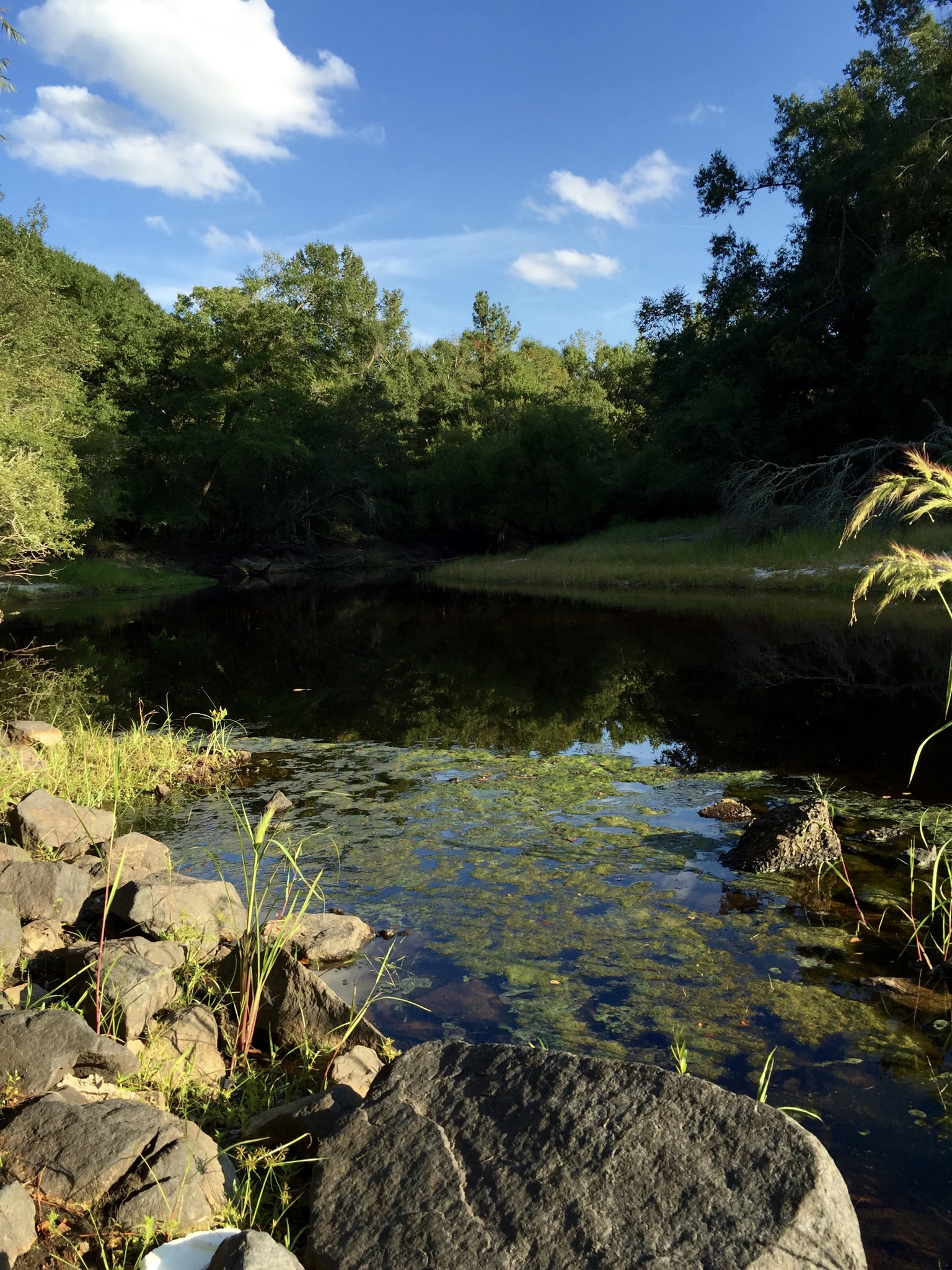
Black River, Kingstree, South Carolina

The Black River is a free-flowing river surrounded by banks of undisturbed land. The river has habitats suitable for endangered species, including the American chaffseed and the swallow-tailed kite. The black color of the river comes from tannins from cypress trees. The river draws sportsmen because of the variety of fish, including bream, red-breasted sunfish, largemouth bass, and catfish.

The Williamsburg County Hometown Chamber Quality of Place Committee was able to get the South Carolina Department of Natural Resources to include a 75-mile stretch of the Black River in the Scenic River Program in 2001. The Black River is one South Carolina's longest rivers and was the seventh addition to the Scenic Rivers. The river is 150 miles long and goes through Williamsburg, Clarendon, Sumter, and Georgetown Counties in South Carolina.

== Demographics ==
Historical population
Census	Pop.	Note	%±
1880	384		—
1890	539		40.4%
1900	760		41.0%
1910	1,372		80.5%
1920	2,074		51.2%
1930	2,392		15.3%
1940	3,182		33.0%
1950	3,621		13.8%
1960	3,847		6.2%
1970	3,381		−12.1%
1980	4,147		22.7%
1990	3,858		−7.0%
2000	3,496		−9.4%
2010	3,328		−4.8%
2020	3,244		−2.5%
U.S. Decennial Census

=== 2020 census ===
Kingstree Racial Composition
Race	Num.	Perc.
White	767	23.64%
Black or African American	2,255	69.51%
Native American	14	0.43%
Asian	69	2.13%
Pacific Islander	48	0.04%
Other/Mixed	88	2.71%
Hispanic or Latino	51	1.57%

As of the 2020 United States Census, there were 3,244 people, 1,414 households, and 725 families residing in the town.

=== 2010 census ===
According to the census of 2010, there were 3,328 people. The racial makeup of the town was 28.5% White, 70.3% African American, 0.1% Native American, 0.4% Asian, and 0.5% from Hispanic or Latino of any race according to the 2000 census. There are 5857 housing units and 88.6% of the units are occupied and 74.7% are owner-occupied units.

In the town, the population was widely distributed by age, with 27.7% under the age of 18, 70.3% who were 18 years of age and older, 13.2% who were 65 years of age or older. The median age was 34.3 years. There were 932 people or 10.8% of people that held a college or graduate degree, and 2,667 people held a high school degree.

== Education ==
Kingstree has a public library, a branch of the Williamsburg County Library system.

== Notable people ==
- Maxine Brown – blues and R&B singer
- Arischa Conner – American Actress
- Carol Connor – first female circuit court and supreme court judge in South Carolina.
- Mary Gordon Ellis – first woman elected to the South Carolina legislature, raised in Kingstree
- Louise Fulton - professional bowler
- Joseph L. Goldstein (born 1940) – Nobel Prize winner
- Uhuru Hamiter – American football player
- JoAnn Haysbert – first female president of Langton University
- John Mack - civic leader
- Bryant McFadden – NFL cornerback for the Pittsburgh Steelers
- Rollee McGill – R&B Singer, musician, saxophone player
- Yancey McGill – former Lt. governor of South Carolina
- Wesley Mouzon - professional boxer
- Clifton Newman - South Carolina circuit court judge and former prosecutor
- Teddy Pendergrass - R&B singer
- J. Victor Rowell – member of the South Carolina House of Representatives
- Thomas D. Singleton – United States Representative from South Carolina
- Stephen Atkins Swails – soldier and politician
- Henry N. Tisdale (born 1944), American academic administrator and mathematician

== Festivals ==
=== Kingstree Pig Pickin' Festival ===
The "Pig Pickin'" Festival is held every fall for all the chefs of Kingstree to compete in a barbecue recipes. The festival draws crowds from all over to test the Williamsburg County vinegar-based barbecue. In 2010, the festival had a record breaking number of contestants. Seventy groups competed with contestants that traveled from other states including North Carolina and Georgia. The area golf course, Swamp Fox Golf Course, sponsors a golf tournament to begin the events every year for the festival. Other events include tennis tournaments, car show, arts and crafts, food venders, live music, and activities for children.

=== Kingstree Trials ===
Since 1996, the Williamsburg Hometown Chamber has sponsored "The King's Tree trials" for those in the Kingstree community. The races take place at the McCutchen training center which is the home of Deborah and Bobby McCutchen in the Cedar Swamp area on a weekend in November. Jockeys and their horses are brought in for the event. Horse racing has been taking place in Williamsburg County since before the Revolution. Nine quarter races take place while families and people from the business community chat and eat barbecue.

== See also ==
- Kingstree Historic District
- Kingstree (Amtrak station)
