= List of U.S. communities with African-American majority populations in 2020 =

The following is a list of United States cities, towns, and census designated places in which a majority (over 50%) of the population is non-Hispanic African American/Black alone as of the 2020 U.S. Census.

== Alabama ==
Population over 100,000

- Birmingham (2020, 68.12%)
- Montgomery (2020, 59.99%)
- Mobile (2020, 51.06%)

Population 25,000 to 99,999

- Bessemer (2020, 69.59%)

Population 10,000 to 24,999

- Center Point (2020, 73.96%)
- Fairfield (2020, 94.74%)
- Forestdale CDP (2020, 78.65%)
- Prichard (2020, 84.58%)
- Selma (2020, 82.12%)
- Talladega (2020, 52.00%)

Population 5,000 to 9,999

- Demopolis (2020, 54.02%)★
- Grayson Valley CDP (2020, 51.97%)★
- Greenville (2020, 58.20%)
- Lanett (2020, 58.79%)
- Midfield (2020, 84.03%)
- Pleasant Grove (2020, 62.00%)★
- Tarrant (2020, 50.59%)
- Tuskegee (2020, 94.34%)

Population 1,000 to 4,999

- Adamsville (2020, 52.68%) ★
- Aliceville (2020, 77.12%)
- Brighton (2020, 77.24%)
- Brundidge (2020, 67.34%)
- Camden (2020, 58.48%)
- Camp Hill (2020, 86.98%)
- Clayton (2020, 62.38%)
- Eutaw (2020, 81.99%)
- Evergreen (2020, 59.52%)
- Fairfield (2020, 94.74%)
- Fort Deposit (2020, 76.90%)
- Georgiana (2020, 72.51%)
- Goodwater (2020, 75.29%)
- Greensboro (2020, 67.76%)
- Holt CDP (2020, 52.21%)
- Lipscomb (2020, 61.79%)
- Livingston (2020, 58.47%)
- Marion (2020, 68.83%)
- Mount Vernon (2020, 74.15%)
- Orrville (2020, 50.67%)
- Reform (2020, 51.45%)★
- Selmont-West Selmont CDP (2020, 94.53%)
- Union Springs (2020, 75.88%)
- Uniontown (2020, 90.32%)
- York (2020, 89.56%)

Population 100 to 999

- Akron (2020, 88.44%)
- Autaugaville (2020, 66.79%)
- Beatrice (2020, 66.18%)
- Bellamy CDP (2020, 88.43%)
- Boligee (2020, 89.70%)
- Boykin (2020, 93.75%)
- Colony (2020, 83.33%)
- Deer Park CDP (2020, 56.03%)
- Edgewater CDP (2020, 69.57%)
- Epes (2020, 94.49%)
- Five Points (2020, 52.63%)
- Forkland (2020, 87.87%)
- Franklin (2020, 80.17%)
- Geiger (2020, 70.97%)
- Gordon (2020, 64.63%)
- Gordonville (2020, 94.29%)
- Hayneville (2020, 83.86%)
- Hillsboro (2020, 82.80%)
- Hissop CDP (2020, 74.64%)
- Hobson City (2020, 80.63%)
- Hurtsboro (2020, 53.87%)
- Lisman (2020, 92.04%)
- Macedonia (2020, 87.14%)
- Midway (2020, 93.59%)
- Mosses (2020, 96.40%)
- Movico CDP (2020, 83.51%)
- Newbern (2020, 63.91%)
- Nixburg CDP (2020, 66.87%)★
- North Courtland (2020, 96.07%)
- Pine Hill (2020, 53.56%)
- Pickensville (2020, 61.40%)
- Shorter (2020, 70.13%)
- Union (2020, 97.78%)
- Vinegar Bend CDP (2020, 80.90%)
- Vredenburgh (2020, 92.79%)
- White Hall (2020, 94.17%)
- Yellow Bluff (2020, 98.56%)

Population under 100

- Catherine CDP (2020, 56.92%)★
- Dayton (2020, 64.29%)
- Emelle (2020, 81.25%)
- McMullen (2020, 87.50%)
- Memphis (2020, 82.76%)
- Panola CDP (2020, 91.55%)
- Ridgeville (2020, 59.04%)

★ New jurisdiction first appearing in the 2020 Census
★ African-American majority as of the 2020 Census

== Arkansas ==
Population over 25,000

- Pine Bluff (2020, 76.95%)

Population 10,000 to 24,999

- Blytheville (2020, 60.00%)
- Camden (2020, 56.00%)
- El Dorado (2020, 50.85%)★
- Forrest City (2020, 70.56%)
- West Memphis (2020, 65.61%)

Population 5,000 to 9,999

- Helena-West Helena (2020, 75.68%)
- Osceola (2020, 55.81%)

Population 1,000 to 4,999

- Brinkley (2020, 51.48%)
- Dermott (2020, 77.73%)
- Dumas (2020, 62.76%)
- Earle (2020, 85.75%)
- Eudora (2020, 90.28%)
- Fordyce (2020, 55.33%)
- Hughes (2020, 76.70%)
- Lake Village (2020, 62.23%)
- Marianna (2020, 76.92%)
- McAlmont (2020, 77.47%)
- Stamps (2020, 55.09%)
- Waldo (2020, 71.42%)
- Wrightsville (2020, 59.86%)

Population 100 to 999

- Altheimer (2020, 92.10%)
- Anthonyville (2020, 94.07%)
- Bluff City (2020, 56.78%)
- Bradley (2020, 54.81%)
- Carthage (2020, 80.63%)
- Chidester (2020, 50.99%)
- College Station CDP (2020, 92.75%)
- Cotton Plant (2020, 68.62%)
- Edmondson (2020, 69.55%)
- Elaine (2020, 70.53%)
- Fulton (2020, 50.43%)★
- Garland (2020, 72.82%)
- Gilmore (2020, 57.95%)
- Goodwin CDP (2020, 62.83%)★
- Gould (2020, 85.97%)
- Grady (2020, 59.67%)
- Haynes (2020, 84.43%)
- Hensley CDP (2020, 62.77%)
- Holly Grove (2020, 92.39%)
- Huttig (2020, 56.03%)
- Jennette (2020, 89.83%)
- Joiner (2020, 58.43%)
- Holly Grove (2020, 92.39%)
- Lake View (2020, 93.27%)
- Lewisville (2020, 60.66%)
- Luxora (2020, 56.58%)
- Madison (2020, 72.33%)
- Marvell (2020, 62.46%)
- McNeil (2020, 56.17%)
- Menifee (2020, 75.91%)
- Mitchellville (2020, 93.17%)
- Montrose (2020, 71.60%)
- Parkdale (2020, 68.02%)
- Parkin (2020, 66.25%)
- Poplar Grove CDP (2020, 65.58%)★
- Reed (2020, 90.77%)
- Rondo (2020, 58.28%)
- Rosston (2020, 56.62%)
- Stephens (2020, 60.00%)
- Strong (2020, 65.85%)
- Sunset (2020, 89.13%)
- Sweet Home CDP (2020, 70.22%)
- Tollette (2020, 93.51%)
- Turrell (2020, 88.59%)
- Wabbaseka (2020, 76.67%)
- Widener (2020, 64.15%)
- Wilmar (2020, 72.66%)
- Wilmot (2020, 77.16%)
- Winchester (2020, 80.29%)
- Woodson CDP (2020, 67.63%)

Population under 100

- Allport (2020, 86.05%)
- Birdsong (2020, 81.25%)
- Fargo (2020, 61.40%)
- Gum Springs (2020, 51.65%)
- Jericho (2020, 93.88%)
- McNab (2020, 60.00%)
- Tucker CDP (2020, 93.68%)★

★ New jurisdiction first appearing in the 2020 Census
★ African-American majority as of the 2020 Census

== California ==
Population over 10,000

- View Park-Windsor Hills CDP (2020, 70.48%)

Population 5,000 to 9,999

- Ladera Heights CDP (2020, 63.59%)

== Connecticut ==
Population 10,000 to 24,999

- Bloomfield (2020, 53.09%)

Population 1,000 to 4,999

- Blue Hills CDP (2020, 83.27%)

== Delaware ==
Population over 50,000

- Wilmington (2020, 54.48%)

== Florida ==
Population over 100,000

- Miami Gardens (2020, 61.87%)

Population 25,000 to 99,999

- Golden Glades CDP (2020, 68.31%)
- Lauderdale Lakes (2020, 83.40%)
- Lauderhill (2020, 75.61%)
- North Lauderdale (2020, 57.20%)
- North Miami (2020, 50.50%)
- Pine Hills CDP (2020, 67.63%)
- Riviera Beach (2020, 60.84%)

Population 10,000 to 24,999

- Belle Glade (2020, 56.49%)
- Brownsville CDP (2020, 50.94%)
- Gladeview CDP (2020, 58.84%)
- Pinewood CDP (2020, 66.09%)
- West Park (2020, 55.29%)

Population 5,000 to 9,999

- Fort Pierce North CDP (2020, 64.80%)
- Gifford CDP (2020, 75.10%)★
- Lake Park (2020, 53.53%)
- Pahokee (2020, 56.77%)
- Pembroke Park (2020, 52.72%)
- Quincy (2020, 60.98%)
- Richmond Heights CDP (2020, 51.93%)
- South Apopka CDP (2020, 54.81%)
- Westview CDP (2020, 56.29%)

Population 1,000 to 4,999

- Boulevard Gardens CDP (2020, 83.05%)
- Century (2020, 55.34%)
- Chattahoochee (2020, 50.46%)
- Cypress Quarters CDP (2020, 52.87%)
- DeLand Southwest CDP (2020, 60.61%)
- Eatonville (2020, 72.03%)
- Franklin Park CDP (2020, 88.39%)
- Goulding CDP (2020, 68.46%)
- Gretna (2020, 81.36%)
- Harlem CDP (2020, 93.77%)
- Havana (2020, 51.28%)
- Madison (2020, 63.50%)
- Mangonia Park (2020, 81.37%)
- Midway (Gadsden County) (2020, 86.57%)
- Midway CDP (Seminole County) (2020, 81.17%)
- Ridgecrest CDP (2020, 58.87%)
- Roosevelt Gardens CDP (2020, 88.14%)
- South Bay (2020, 63.72%)
- Tangelo Park CDP (2020, 68.56%)
- Washington Park CDP (2020, 89.17%)

Population under 1,000

- Campbellton (2020, 55.50%)
- Charleston Park CDP (2020, 59.57%)
- East Williston CDP (2020, 71.41%)
- Greenville (2020, 64.34%)
- Homestead Base CDP (2020, 52.85%)
- Jacob City (2020, 88.02%)
- Lamont CDP (2020, 53.53%)
- Lloyd CDP (2020 54.01%)
- Raleigh CDP (2020, 53.78%)
- Tildenville CDP (2020, 57.89%)

★ African-American majority as of the 2020 Census

== Georgia ==
Population over 100,000

- Augusta (2020, 55.19%)☆
- Macon (2020, 54.67%)☆☆
- South Fulton (2020, 89.79%)★

Population 25,000 to 99,999

- Albany (2020, 74.59%)
- Douglasville (2020, 64.09%)
- East Point (2020, 76.01%)
- Redan CDP (2020, 88.99%)
- Stonecrest (2020, 91.39%)★
- Union City (2020, 84.55%)
- Valdosta (2020, 54.28%)

Population 10,000 to 24,999

- Americus (2020, 62.1%)
- Bainbridge (2020, 56.03%)
- Belvedere Park CDP (2020, 61.60%)
- Brunswick (2020, 56.20%)
- Candler-McAfee CDP (2020, 80.11%)
- Clarkston (2020, 64.32%)
- College Park (2020, 79.09%)
- Conyers (2020, 69.62%)
- Cordele (2020, 66.69%)
- Douglas (2020, 52.15%)
- Dublin (2020, 61.04%)
- Fairburn (2020, 76.45%)
- Griffin (2020, 52.74%)
- Panthersville CDP (2020, 90.74%)
- Powder Springs (2020, 54.36%)
- Riverdale (2020, 77.84%)
- Thomasville (2020, 52.30%)
- Waycross (2020, 55.03%)

Population 5,000 to 9,999

- Austell (2020, 58.34%)
- Blakely (2020, 69.00%)
- Camilla (2020, 72.89%)
- Conley (2020, 60.88%)
- Eatonton (2020, 56.33%)
- Fort Valley 2020, 77.73%)
- Gresham Park CDP (2020, 72.68%)
- Irondale CDP (2020, 69.55%)
- Palmetto (2020, 58.15%)
- Sandersville (2020, 63.22%)
- Stone Mountain (2020, 72.31%)
- Sylvester (2020, 59.21%)
- Thomson (2020, 65.85%)
- Waynesboro (2020, 66.58%)

Population 1,000 to 4,999

- Abbeville (2020, 61.04%)
- Arlington (2020, 79.74%)
- Ashburn (2020, 65.98%)
- Boston (2020, 60.07%)
- Buena Vista (2020, 61.20%)
- Cuthbert (2020, 80.4%)
- Davisboro (2020, 69.49%)
- Dawson (2020, 81.97%)
- Donalsonville (2020, 61.21%)
- Edison (2020, 72.68%)
- Experiment CDP (2020, 60.82%)
- Gordon (2020, 52.94%)
- Greensboro (2020, 60.20%)
- Hardwick CDP (2020, 72.36%)
- Heron Bay CDP (2020, 63.88%)★
- Jonesboro (2020, 53.06%)
- Lithonia (2020, 83.10%)
- Louisville (2020, 67.83%)
- Marshallville (2020, 77.67%)
- Millen (2020, 59.78%)
- Montezuma (2020, 71.38%)
- Morgan (2020, 67.78%)
- Ocilla (2020, 51.14%)
- Pelham (2020, 59.37%)
- Quitman (2020, 69.02%)
- Richland (2020, 70.58%)
- Soperton (2020, 56.87%)
- Sparta (2020, 82.24%)
- Tennille (2020, 67.19%)
- Unadilla (2020, 65.04%)
- Union Point (2020, 53.73%)
- Unionville CDP (2020, 94.67%)
- Vienna (2020, 70.97%)
- Wadley (2020, 77.97%)
- Walthourville (2020, 57.15%)
- Warrenton (2020, 73.17%)
- Washington (2020, 60.66%)
- West Point (2020, 54.88%)
- Wrens (2020, 65.54%)
- Wrightsville (2020, 52.71%)

Population 100 to 999

- Alapaha (2020, 53.85%)
- Baconton (2020, 55.96%)
- Bartow (2020, 51.61%)
- Bronwood (2020, 64.67%)
- Chester (2010, 60.57%)
- Coleman CDP (2020, 63.79%)
- Crawfordville (2020, 57.83%)
- Damascus (2020, 64.62%)
- De Soto (2020, 68.55%)
- Eulonia CDP (2020, 62.11%)★
- Fort Gaines (2020, 75.48%)
- Gough CDP (2020, 72.26%)★
- Greenville (2020, 59.57%)
- Harrison (2020, 71.98%)
- Hilltop CDP (2020, 79.59%)
- Hiltonia (2020, 60.65%)
- Ideal (2020, 66.34%)
- Irwinton (2020, 52.35%)
- Jeffersonville (2020, 64.69%)
- Junction City (2020, 71.01%)
- Keysville (2020, 61.67%)
- Leary (2020, 76.53%)
- Lincoln Park CDP (2020, 88.13%)
- Lumber City (2020, 52.43%)
- Lumpkin (2020, 67.23%)
- McIntyre (2020, 65.39%)
- Meigs (2020, 62.07%)
- Midville (2020, 57.66%)★
- Musella CDP (2020, 67.31%)★
- Norwood (2020, 69.80%)
- Oglethorpe (2020, 68.84%)
- Phillipsburg CDP (2020, 96.09%)
- Pineview (2020, 65.42%)
- Plains (2020, 53.58%)★
- Rains CDP (2020, 72.31%)★
- Riceboro (2020, 82.76%)
- Salem CDP (2020, 89.25%)
- Sharon (2020, 50.00%)
- Shellman (2020, 63.30%)
- Siloam (2020, 56.70%)
- Smithville (2020, 67.96%)
- Talbotton (2020, 80.86%)
- Warthen CDP (2020, 61.36%)★
- Warwick (2020, 56.55%)
- Woodbury (2020, 55.51%)
- Woodland (2020, 77.38%)
- Woodville (2020, 62.12%)

Population under 100

- Dooling (2020, 67.65%)
- Geneva (2020, 52.00%)

☆Consolidated city-county with Richmond County excluding the cities of Blythe and Hephzibah
☆☆Consolidated city-county with Bibb County
★ New jurisdiction first appearing in the 2020 Census
★ African-American majority as of the 2020 Census

== Illinois ==
Population over 25,000

- Calumet City (2020, 72.04%)

Population 10,000 to 25,000

- Bellwood (2020, 67.62%)
- Cahokia (2020, 70.72%)★
- Country Club Hills (2020, 85.63%)
- Dolton (2020, 90.18%)
- East St. Louis (2020, 94.95%)
- Harvey (2020, 62.63%)
- Hazel Crest (2020, 85.50%)
- Markham (2020, 72.21%)
- Matteson (2020, 82.01%)
- Maywood (2020, 60.36%)
- Park Forest (2020, 69.27%)
- Richton Park (2020, 86.01%)
- Riverdale (2020, 91.82%)
- South Holland (2020, 80.49%)

Population 5,000 to 9,999

- Broadview (2020, 70.54%)
- Calumet Park (2020, 88.68%)
- Flossmoor (2020, 58.17%)★
- Glenwood (2020, 74.54%)
- Lynwood (2020, 75.35%)
- Sauk Village (2020, 67.27%)
- University Park (2020, 86.76%)

Population 1,000 to 4,999

- Alorton (2020, 92.72%)★
- Burnham (2020, 59.79%)
- Cairo (2020, 68.84%)
- Centreville (2020, 93.79%)★
- East Hazel Crest (2020, 57.67%)
- Ford Heights (2020, 91.06%)
- Madison (2020, 63.10%)
- Olympia Fields (2020, 77.32%)
- Phoenix (2020, 84.60%)
- Robbins (2020, 84.42%)
- Venice (2020, 94.86%)
- Washington Park (2020, 77.82%)
- Willowbrook CDP (2020, 51.41%)★

Population under 1,000

- Brooklyn (2020, 93.07%)
- Hopkins Park (2020, 80.07%)
- Mound City (2020, 56.08%)
- Mounds (2020, 75.95%)
- Pulaski (2020, 56.49%)
- Royal Lakes (2020, 50.90%)
- Sun River Terrace (2020, 73.41%)

Population under 100

- Unity CDP (2020, 76.53%)★

★ Cahokia, Allerton, and Centreville merged in May 2021 to form the city of Cahokia Heights
★ New jurisdiction first appearing in the 2020 Census
★ African-American majority as of the 2020 Census

== Indiana ==
Population over 50,000

- Gary (2020, 79.11%)

Population 25,000 to 49,999

- Merrillville (2020, 50.11%)★

★African-American majority as of the 2020 Census

== Kansas ==
Population under 100

- Nicodemus CDP (2020, 71.43%)★

★New jurisdiction first appearing in the 2020 Census

== Kentucky ==
Population 10,000 to 25,000

- Shively (2020, 54.57%)★

★African-American majority as of the 2020 Census

== Louisiana ==
Population over 100,000

- Baton Rouge (2020, 53.55%)
- New Orleans (2020, 53.61%)
- Shreveport (2020, 55.77%)

Population 25,000 to 99,999

- Alexandria (2020, 54.65%)
- LaPlace CDP (2020, 54.20%)★
- Marrero CDP (2020, 50.12%)★
- Monroe (2020, 63.24%)

Population 10,000 to 24,999

- Baker (2020, 81.99%)
- Minden (2020, 53.25%)
- Natchitoches (2020, 54.84%)
- Opelousas (2020, 77.18%)
- Woodmere CDP (2020, 79.28%)

Population 5,000 to 9,999

- Bastrop (2020, 75.41%)
- Brownfields CDP (2020, 79.01%)
- Donaldsonville (2020, 77.31%)
- Franklin (2020, 54.99%)
- Grambling (2020, 96.47%)
- Jeanerette (2020, 71.00%)
- Merrydale CDP (2020, 92.84%)
- Monticello CDP (2020, 86.98%)
- Reserve CDP (2020, 58.67%)
- St. Martinville (2020, 60.23%)
- Tallulah (2020, 80.13%)
- Ville Platte (2020, 64.56%)
- Violet CDP (2020, 61.51%)
- Waggaman CDP (2020, 64.62%)

Population 1,000 to 4,999

- Amite City (2020, 54.43%)
- Arcadia (2020, 69.01%)
- Baldwin (2020, 62.71%)
- Belle Rose CDP (2020, 53.42%)
- Bernice (2020, 58.70%)
- Boutte (2020, 56.12%)
- Bunkie (2020, 61.00%)
- Clinton (2020, 52.91%)
- Colfax (2020, 58.40%)
- Cottonport (2020, 58.87%)
- Coushatta (2020, 67.07%)
- Delhi (2020, 65.87%)
- Edgard (2020, 89.37%)
- Farmerville (2020, 64.23%)
- Ferriday (2020, 84.79%)
- Haynesville (2020, 60.47%)
- Homer (2020, 68.58%)
- Jonesville (2020, 75.41%)
- Kentwood (2020, 76.55%)
- Lake Providence (2020, 80.37%)
- Lutcher (2020, 51.80%)
- Mansfield (2020, 78.3%)
- Mansura (2020, 61.29%)
- New Roads (2020, 56.98%)
- North Vacherie CDP (2020, 74.49%)
- Port Allen (2020, 59.77%)
- Port Sulphur CDP (2020, 60.41%)
- Rayville (2020, 72.42%)
- Richwood (2020, 58.70%)
- Ringgold (2020, 56.93%)
- Simmesport (2020, 58.45%)
- Supreme CDP (2020, 79.86%)
- White Castle (2020, 90.19%)
- Winnfield (2020, 53.21%)
- Winnsboro (2020, 72.77%)

Population 100 to 999

- Bayou Goula CDP (2020, 90.47%)
- Bonita (2020, 58.24%)
- Boyce (2020, 69.26%)
- Campti (2020, 76.55%)
- Chataignier (2020, 54.44%)
- Cheneyville (2020, 68.38%)
- Clarence (2020, 73.31%)
- Clayton (2020, 72.95%)
- Convent CDP (2020, 52.80%)
- Cullen (2020, 86.45%)
- Darrow CDP (2020, 82.50%)★
- Dorseyville CDP (2020, 100.00%)★
- East Hodge (2020, 94.61%)
- Frierson CDP (2020, 61.36%)
- Gibsland (2020, 85.38%)
- Glencoe CDP (2020, 84.85%)
- Grand Coteau (2020, 62.24%)
- Killona CDP (2020, 98.20%)
- Lecompte (2020, 65.33%)
- Lemannville CDP (2020, 76.69%)
- Lucky (2020, 54.98%)
- Maringouin (2020, 86.42%)
- Marion (2020, 57.95%)
- Moonshine CDP (2020, 85.71%)
- Morrow CDP (2020, 81.88%)★
- Napoleonville (2020, 79.26%)
- Natchez (2020, 93.25%)
- Newellton (2020, 72.80%)
- Pointe à la Hache CDP (2020, 86.89%)
- Powhatan (2020, 72.28%)
- Roseland (2020, 61.36%)
- St. James CDP (2020, 85.64%)
- St. Joseph (2020, 77.14%)
- St. Maurice CDP (2020, 69.92%)
- Siracusaville CDP (2020, 88.89%)
- South Mansfield (2020, 75.68%)
- Tangipahoa (2020, 85.18%)
- Union CDP (2020, 76.87%)
- Vienna Bend CDP (2020, 58.75%)★
- Wallace CDP (2020, 87.81%)
- Washington (2020, 55.26%)
- Waterproof (2020, 90.76%)
- Welcome CDP (2020, 93.60%)
- Wilson (2020, 74.43%)

Population under 100

- Romeville CDP (2020, 74.75%)

★New jurisdiction first appearing in the 2020 Census
★African-American majority as of the 2020 Census

== Maryland ==
Population over 100,000

- Baltimore (2020, 57.30%)

Population 24,999 to 99,999

- Bowie (2020, 52.86%)★
- Clinton CDP (2020, 77.18%)
- Fairland CDP (2020, 56.70%)
- Landover CDP (2020, 64.03%)
- Lochearn CDP (2020, 80.37%)
- Milford Mill CDP (2020, 82.82%)
- Owings Mills CDP (2020, 59.47%)
- Randallstown CDP (2020, 80.68%)
- South Laurel CDP (2020, 56.11%)
- Suitland CDP (2020, 86.78%)
- Waldorf CDP (2020, 62.87%)
- Woodlawn CDP (Baltimore County) (2020, 55.87%)

Population 10,000 to 24,999

- Accokeek CDP (2020, 67.10%)
- Bensville CDP (2020, 55.74%)★
- Bladensburg (2020, 53.49%)
- Brandywine CDP (2020, 76.08%)
- Brock Hall CDP (2020, 86.79%)
- Camp Springs CDP (2020, 74.10%)
- Forestville CDP (2020, 80.82%)
- Fort Washington CDP (2020, 63.20%)
- Glassmanor CDP (2020, 73.69%)
- Glenn Dale CDP (2020, 60.89%)
- Hillcrest Heights CDP (2020, 86.57%)
- Jessup CDP (2020, 54.56%)
- Kettering CDP (2020, 89.96%)
- Lake Arbor CDP (2020, 85.32%)
- Lanham CDP (2020, 53.16%)
- Largo CDP (2020, 87.32%)
- Mitchellville CDP (2020, 82.78%)
- New Carrollton (2020, 52.07%)
- Oxon Hill CDP (2020, 64.20%)
- Rosaryville CDP (2020. 81.40%)
- Seabrook CDP (2020, 60.44%)
- Summerfield CDP (2020, 86.44%)
- Walker Mill CDP (2020, 88.10%)
- Westphalia CDP (2020, 78.72%)
- White Oak CDP (2020, 56.29%)★

Population 5,000 to 9,999

- Bryans Road CDP (2020, 61.82%)
- Coral Hills CDP (2020, 80.64%)
- District Heights (2020, 84.41%)
- Fairwood CDP (2020, 76.12%)
- Friendly CDP (2020, 67.39%)
- Glenarden (2020, 77.37%)
- Marlboro Village CDP (2020, 87.09%)
- Marlow Heights CDP (2020, 74.92%)
- Marlton CDP (2020, 82.62%)
- National Harbor CDP (2020, 54.17%)
- Peppermill Village CDP (2020, 80.81%)
- Silver Hill CDP (2020, 89.33%)
- Temple Hills CDP (2020, 81.83%)

Population 1,000 to 4,999

- Brown Station CDP (2020, 81.84%)★
- Cedar Heights CDP (2020, 82.03%)★
- Capitol Heights (2020, 81.33%)
- Fairmount Heights (2020, 71.40%)
- Forest Heights (2020, 57.45%)
- Indian Head (2020, 60.14%)
- Konterra CDP (2020, 50.06%)★
- Marlboro Meadows CDP (2020, 78.80%)
- Melwood CDP (2020, 64.77%)
- Princess Anne (2020, 65.96%)
- Queensland CDP (2020, 72.71%)
- Seat Pleasant (2020, 77.44%)
- Springdale CDP (2020, 81.40%)
- Woodmore CDP (2020, 79.90%)

Population 100 to 999

- Butlertown CDP (2020, 53.65%)
- Georgetown CDP (2020, 51.28%)
- Highland Beach (2020, 63.56%)
- Maryland Park CDP (2020, 68.50%)★
- Upper Marlboro (2020, 59.36%)

Population under 100

- Eagle Harbor (2020, 52.24%)

★ New jurisdiction first appearing in the 2020 Census
★ African-American majority as of the 2020 Census

== Michigan ==
Population over 100,000

- Detroit (2020, 77.17%)

Population 50,000 to 99,999

- Flint (2020, 55.74%)
- Southfield (2020, 70.10%)

Population 10,000 to 49,999

- Harper Woods (2020, 65.83%)★
- Inkster (2020, 72.77%)
- Muskegon Heights (2020, 72.99%)
- Oak Park (2020, 55.24%)

Population 5,000 to 9,999

- Beecher CDP (2020, 66.84%)
- Benton Harbor (2020, 83.15%)
- Buena Vista CDP (2020, 72.57%)
- Buena Vista Charter Township (2020, 57.93%)☆
- Highland Park (2020, 87.74%)

Population 1,000 to 4,999

- Benton Heights CDP (2020, 55.67%)
- Lathrup Village (2020, 62.33%)
- Royal Oak Charter Township (2020, 88.88%)☆

☆ Charter townships in Michigan are city-equivalents
★ African-American majority as of the 2020 Census

== Mississippi ==
Population over 100,000

- Jackson (2020, 78.55%)

Population 25,000 to 99,999

- Greenville (2020, 80.17%)
- Hattiesburg (2020, 50.90%)
- Meridian (2020, 65.52%)

Population 10,000 to 24,999

- Brookhaven (2020, 57.48%)
- Byram (2020, 71.05%)
- Canton (2020, 72.96%)
- Clarksdale (2020, 81.49%)
- Columbus (2020, 63.71%)
- Greenwood (2020, 70.38%)
- Laurel (2020, 62.01%)
- McComb (2020, 70.59%)
- Moss Point (2020, 71.25%)
- Natchez (2020, 60.12%)
- Vicksburg (2020, 66.86%)
- West Point (2020, 62.10%)
- Yazoo City (2020, 85.60%)

Population 5,000 to 9,999

- Holly Springs (2020, 79.23%)
- Indianola (2020, 85.39%)
- Louisville (2020, 64.15%)

Population 1,000 to 4,999

- Alcorn State University CDP (2020, 98.84%)
- Aberdeen (2020, 70.63%)
- Belzoni (2020, 82.15%)
- Centreville (2020, 71.30%)
- Charleston (2020, 75.0%)
- Coldwater (2020, 74.73%)
- Collins (2020, 52.31%)
- Como (2020, 69.50%)
- Drew (2020, 84.94%)
- Durant (2020, 88.03%)
- Fayette (2020, 95.43%)
- Glendale CDP (2020, 60.26%)
- Goodman (2020, 74.64%)
- Hazlehurst (2020, 75.82%)
- Hillsboro CDP (2020, 60.17%)
- Hollandale (2020, 89.02%)
- Itta Bena (2020, 92.32%)
- Lambert (2020, 91.83%)
- Leakesville (2020, 52.48%)
- Leland (2020, 71.39%)
- Lexington (2020, 79.78%)
- Lumberton (2020, 55.29%)
- Macon (2020, 80.87%)
- Magnolia (2020, 67.76%)
- Marks (2020, 71.40%)
- Moorhead (2020, 74.50%)
- Morgantown CDP (Adams County) (2020, 69.79%)
- Mound Bayou (2020, 96.81%)
- Newton (2020, 69.64%)
- Okolona (2020, 76.48%)
- Port Gibson (2020, 88.42%)
- Rawls Springs CDP (2020, 62.31%)
- Raymond (2020, 57.35%)
- Rolling Fork (2020, 73.92%)
- Rosedale (2020, 88.07%)
- Ruleville (2020, 84.71%)
- Sardis (2020, 66.08%)
- Shannon (2020, 61.43%)
- Shaw (2020, 94.44%)
- Shelby (2020, 94.56%)
- Summit (2020, 76.88%)
- Tchula (2020, 97.28%)
- Terry (2020, 72.93%)
- Tunica Resorts CDP (2020, 75.47%)
- Tutwiler (2020, 63.93%)
- Verona (2020, 78.98%)
- Walls (2020, 60.18%)
- Waynesboro (2020, 63.24%)
- Winona (2020, 54.14%)

Population 100 to 999

- Alligator (2020, 81.90%)
- Anguilla (2020, 76.81%)
- Arcola (2020, 86.84%)
- Artesia (2020, 84.87%)
- Benoit (2020, 77.26%)
- Beulah (2020, 90.08%)
- Bobo CDP (Coahoma County) (2020, 78.81%)★
- Bogue Chitto CDP (Lincoln County) (2020, 52.63%)
- Bolton (2020, 72.56%)
- Brooksville (2020, 75.63%)
- Buckatunna CDP (2020, 57.44%)
- Bude (2020, 52.05%)
- Cary (2020, 53.94%)
- Cloverdale CDP (2020, 63.02%)
- Coahoma (2020, 98.69%)
- Coffeeville (2020,64.99%)
- Crawford (2020, 90.84%)
- Crenshaw (2020, 77.12%)
- Crosby (2020, 72.31%)
- Crowder (2020, 62.65%)
- Cruger (2020, 76.49%)
- Darling CDP (2020, 84.42%)
- De Kalb (2020, 71.95%)
- Derma (2020, 58.52%)
- Duck Hill (2020, 70.92%)
- Duncan (2020, 66.30%)
- Eden (2020, 55.64%)
- Edwards (2020, 84.72%)
- Elizabeth CDP (2020. 75.59%)★
- Falcon (2020, 99.14%)
- Farrell (2020, 88.00%)
- Friars Point (2020, 96.65%)
- Glen Allan CDP (2020, 50.67%)★
- Glendora (2020, 94.16%)
- Gloster (2020, 70.57%)
- Gunnison (2020, 83.39%)
- Heidelberg (2020, 85.40%)
- Hermanville CDP (2020, 95.81%)★
- Hickory (2020, 55.88%)★
- Isola (2020, 82.45%)
- Jonestown (Coahoma County) (2020, 98.13%)
- Kilmichael (2020, 53.36%)
- Lauderdale CDP (2020, 58.48%)
- Louise (2020, 50.56%)★
- Lula (2020, 82.84%)
- Maben (2020, 64.33%)
- Mayersville (2020, 67.44%)
- Merigold (2020, 53.03%)
- Metcalfe (2020, 94.73%)
- Mississippi Valley State University CDP (2020, 73.66%)
- Morgan City (2020, 81.64%)
- Mount Olive (2020, 64.13%)
- North Tunica (2020, 90.53%)
- Oakland (2020, 70.35%)
- Pace (2020, 84.70%)
- Panther Burn CDP (2020, 97.39%)★
- Pattison CDP (2020, 89.20%)★
- Pickens (2020, 92.07%)
- Renova (2020, 94.53%)
- Roxie (2020, 62.05%)
- Schlater (2020, 72.46%)
- Scooba (2020, 72.45%)
- Shubuta (2020, 83.25%)
- Shuqualak (2020, 84.71%)
- Sidon (2020, 93.89%)
- Silver City (2020, 74.89%)
- Sledge (2020, 94.84%)
- State Line (2020, 54.20%)
- Sunflower (2020, 87.76%)
- Utica (2020, 67.45%)
- Vaiden (2020, 61.74%)
- Walnut Grove (2020, 69.61%)
- Webb (2020, 88.22%)
- Weir (2020, 61.45%)
- White Oak CDP (2020, 98.32%)
- Winstonville (2020, 98.04%)
- Woodville (2020, 72.95%)

Population under 100

- Austin CDP (2020, 86.27%)★
- Bolivar CDP (2020, 71.79%)★
- Doddsville (2020, 88.61%)
- Dundee CDP (2020, 93.15%)★
- Grace CDP (2020, 72.73%)★
- Nitta Yuma CDP (2020, 75.00%)★
- Symonds CDP (2020, 92.67%)★
- Winterville CDP (2020, 87.50%)★

★ New jurisdiction first appearing in the 2020 Census
★ African-American majority as of the 2020 Census

== Missouri ==
Population over 10,000

- Bellefontaine Neighbors (2020, 82.74%)
- Ferguson (2020, 71.80%)
- Jennings (2020, 90.69%)
- Old Jamestown CDP (2020, 68.37%)
- Spanish Lake CDP (2020, 82.25%)

Population 5,000 to 9,999

- Berkeley (2020, 76.51%)
- Black Jack (2020, 84.55%)

Population 1,000 to 4,999

- Bel-Ridge (2020, 79.22%)
- Calverton Park (2020, 52.93%)★
- Castle Point CDP (2020, 89.95%)
- Charleston (2020, 52.20%)
- Cool Valley (2020, 82.58%)
- Country Club Hills (2020, 90.43%)
- Dellwood (2020, 84.66%)
- Glasgow Village (2020, 87.96%)
- Hanley Hills (2020, 81.73%)
- Hillsdale (2020, 92.93%)
- Moline Acres (2020, 93.27%)
- Normandy (2020, 70.21%)★
- Northwoods (2020, 92.76%)
- Pagedale (2020, 90.99%)
- Pine Lawn (2020, 94.41%)
- Riverview (2020, 75.97%)
- Velda City (2020, 91.75%)
- Vinita Park (2020, 62.44%)
- Wellston (2020, 93.04%)

Population 100 to 999

- Beverly Hills (2020, 90.11%)
- Flordell Hills (2020, 91.02%)
- Glen Echo Park (2020, 77.05%)★
- Greendale (2020, 68.07%)
- Hayti Heights (2020, 89.32%)
- Haywood City (2020, 82.71%)
- Howardville (2020, 91.34%)
- Kinloch (2020, 55.89%)
- Norwood Court (2020, 93.15%)
- Pasadena Hills (2020, 65.46%)
- Pasadena Park (2020, 67.36%)
- Uplands Park (2020, 95.83%)
- Velda Village Hills (2020, 94.21%)

Population under 100

- Homestown (2020, 80.82%)
- North Lilbourn (2020, 81.82%)
- Penermon (2020, 84.31%)
- Pinhook (2020, 50.00%)
- Wilson City (2020, 89.61%)

★ Glen Echo Park voted to become part of Normandy in 2024
★ African-American majority as of the 2020 Census

== New Jersey ==
Population over 50,000

- East Orange (2020, 78.56%)
- Irvington (2020, 78.80%)

Population 25,000 to 49,999

- Orange (2020, 62.78%)
- Willingboro Township (2020, 68.80%)

Population 5,000 to 24,999

- Hillside (2020, 50.44%)
- Salem (2020, 58.50%)
- Vauxhall CDP (2020, 72.84%)★

Population under 5,000

- Gouldtown CDP (2020, 64.71%)★
- Lawnside (2020, 74.99%)

★ New jurisdiction first appearing in the 2020 Census

== New York ==
Population over 50,000

- Mount Vernon (2020, 60.43%)

Population 5,000 to 9,999

- Lakeview CDP (2020, 69.92%)
- Wheatley Heights CDP (2020, 50.95%)

== North Carolina ==
Population over 50,000

- Rocky Mount (2020, 63.35%)

Population 25,000 to 49,999

- Goldsboro (2020, 53.09%)

Population 10,000 to 24,999

- Elizabeth City (2020, 50.09%)
- Henderson (2020, 64.54%)
- Kinston (2020, 68.42%)

Population 5,000 to 9,999

- Oxford (2020, 54.30%)
- Wadesboro (2020, 61.88%)
- Williamston (2020, 61.62%)

Population 1,000 to 4,999

- Ahoskie (2020, 68.17%)
- Bethel (2020, 54.77%)
- Chadbourn (2020, 62.01%)
- East Spencer (2020, 68.79%)
- Edenton (2020, 52.35%)
- Elm City (2020, 53.28%)
- Enfield (2020, 84.93%)
- Fairmont (2020, 57.78%)
- La Grange (2020, 51.71%)
- Maxton (2020, 61.0%)
- Murfreesboro (2020, 51.39%)
- Navassa (2020, 57.64%)
- Pinetops (2020, 62.42%)
- Plymouth (2020, 68.04%)
- Powellsville (2020, 61.38%)
- Princeville (2020, 92.66%)
- Robersonville (2020, 59.89%)
- Scotland Neck (2020, 67.56%)
- Sharpsburg (2020, 61.70%)
- South Rosemary CDP (2020, 55.18%)
- Weldon (2020, 72.92%)
- Windsor (2020, 61.08%)

Population 100 to 999

- Ansonville (2020, 72.27%)
- Bolton (2020, 57.23%)
- Bowdens CDP (2020, 60.20%)★
- Brunswick (2020, 59.10%)
- Cofield (2020, 86.89%)
- Conetoe (2020, 66.16%)
- East Arcadia (2020, 85.89%)
- Fair Bluff (2020, 58.67%)
- Garysburg (2020, 95.35%)
- Hamilton (2020, 57.19%)
- Kelford (2020, 70.44%)
- Kingstown (2020, 88.26%)
- Lewiston Woodville (2020, 79.58%)
- Light Oak CDP (2020, 70.59%)
- Middleburg (2020, 69.31%)
- Morven (2020, 76.90%)
- Northwest (2020, 59.46%)
- Oak City (2020, 54.89%)
- Parmele (2020, 75.72%)
- Rich Square (2020, 64.54%)
- Roper (2020, 80.41%)
- Rowland (2020, 65.08%)
- Roxobel (2020, 52.94%)★
- Seaboard (2020, 78.78%)
- Silver City CDP (2020, 84.60%)
- South Weldon CDP (2020, 87.45%)
- Whitakers (2020, 69.06%)
- Winton (2020, 60.1%)

Population under 100

- Hassell (2020, 67.35%)

★ New jurisdiction first appearing in the 2020 Census ★ African-American majority as of the 2020 Census

== Ohio ==
Population over 25,000

- Euclid (2020, 63.52%)
- Garfield Heights (2020, 55.80%)★

Population 10,000 to 24,999

- Bedford (2020, 51.98%)★
- Bedford Heights (2020, 76.94%)
- East Cleveland (2020, 89.28%)
- Forest Park (2020, 55.72%)
- Maple Heights (2020, 74.59%)
- Richmond Heights (2020, 58.89%)★
- South Euclid (2020, 52.99%)★
- Trotwood (2020, 68.63%)
- Warrensville Heights (2020, 91.08%)

Population 5,000 to 9,999

- North College Hill (2020, 58.29%)★

Population 1,000 to 4,999

- Fort McKinley CDP (2020, 70.72%)
- Golf Manor (2020, 62.09%)
- Lincoln Heights (2020, 89.38%)
- Oakwood (Cuyahoga County) (2020, 63.61%)
- Skyline Acres CDP (2020, 81.12%)
- Urbancrest (2020, 58.10%)
- Wilberforce CDP (2020, 83.57%)
- Woodlawn (2020, 57.27%)

Population under 1,000

- Highland Hills (2020, 84.74%)
- North Randall (2020, 85.12%)
- Twinsburg Heights CDP (2020, 74.17%)
- Woodmere (2020, 59.91%)

★ African-American majority as of the 2020 Census

== Oklahoma ==
Population 1,000 to 4,999

- Forest Park (2020, 66.83%)
- Langston (2020, 77.76%)
- Spencer (2020, 51.01%)

Population 100 to 999

- Fort Coffee (2020, 51.64%)
- Grayson (2020, 59.06%)★
- Rentiesville (2020,50.49%)
- Summit (2020, 63.89%)
- Taft (2020, 78.74%)
- Tatums (2020, 90.09%)

Population under 100

- Clearview (2020, 65.85%)
- Meridian (Logan County) (2020, 50.00%)

★ African-American majority as of the 2020 Census

== Pennsylvania ==
Population over 25,000

- Chester (2020, 69.19%)

Population 10,000 to 24,999

- Darby (2020, 82.59%)
- Lansdowne (2020, 53.20%)★
- Wilkinsburg (2020, 58.24%)
- Yeadon (2020, 87.71%)

Population 5,000 to 9,999

- Collingdale (2020, 54.50%)★
- Sharon Hill (2020, 69.89%)

Population 1,000 to 4,999

- Braddock (2020, 70.83%)
- Chester Township (2020, 77.13%)☆
- Colwyn (2020, 82.94%)
- East Lansdowne (2020, 65.59%)
- Homestead (2020, 60.40%)
- Rankin (2020, 79.32%)

☆ City-equivalent
★ African-American majority as of the 2020 Census

== South Carolina ==
Population 10,000 to 24,999

- Dentsville CDP (2020, 68.33%)
- Gantt CDP (2020, 50.17%)
- Orangeburg (2020, 76.43%)
- St. Andrews CDP (2020, 64.58%)

Population 5,000 to 9,999

- Bennettsville (2020, 64.52%)
- Cheraw (2020, 52.40%)
- Chester (2020, 65.44%)
- Darlington (2020, 60.37%)
- Dillon (2020, 53.54%)
- Georgetown (2020, 51.67%)
- Lake City (2020, 78.72%)
- Marion (2020, 69.77%)
- Woodfield CDP (2020, 55.39%)

Population 1,000 to 4,999

- Allendale (2020, 85.75%)
- Andrews (2020, 62.49%)
- Arthurtown CDP (2020, 50.78%)★
- Bamberg (2020, 57.54%)
- Barnwell (2020, 51.44%)
- Bishopville (2020, 70.60%)
- Blackville (2020, 82.32%)
- Brookdale CDP (2020, 95.73%)
- Calhoun Falls (2020, 55.07%)
- Capitol View CDP (2020, 56.67%)★
- Edisto CDP (2020, 71.53%)
- Denmark (2020, 89.74%)
- Edgefield (2020, 52.58%)
- Estill (2020, 77.59%)
- Fairfax (2020, 78.87%)
- Gadsden CDP (2020, 88.70%)
- Holly Hill (2020, 50.62%)
- Hopkins CDP (2020, 80.07%)
- Johnston (2020, 62.59%)
- Kingstree (2020, 69.51%)
- Manning (2020, 64.11%)
- McCormick (2020, 65.73%)
- Mullins (2020, 68.01%)
- Ridgeville (2020, 59.81%)
- Seabrook CDP (2020, 62.31%)★
- St. Matthews (2020, 58.01%)
- St. Stephen (2020, 51.56%)
- South Sumter CDP (2020, 85.62%)
- Timmonsville (2020, 84.37%)
- Varnville (2020, 61.89%)
- Wilkinson Heights CDP (2020, 93.37%)
- Williston (2020, 51.62%)
- Winnsboro (2020, 59.91%)
- Yemassee (2020, 58.33%)

Population 100 to 999

- Adams Run CDP (2020, 62.00%)★
- Bowman (2020, 68.78%)
- Browntown CDP (2020, 84.47%)★
- Bucksport CDP (2020, 88.59%)
- Carlisle (2020, 89.41%)
- Cash CDP (2020, 82.70%)★
- Centenary CDP (2020, 73.30%)★
- Clarks Hill CDP (2020, 76.82%)
- Clio (2020, 68.59%)
- Cokesbury CDP (2020, 54.72%)
- Cross Hill (2020, 52.72%)
- Dale CDP (2020, 77.57%)★
- Daviston CDP (2020, 51.08%)★
- Dovesville CDP (2020, 60.22%)★
- Dunbar CDP (2020, 96.42%)★
- Eastover (2020, 91.69%)
- Elliott CDP (2020, 85.68%)★
- Elko (2020, 52.14%)
- Finklea CDP (2020, 63.57%)★
- Foreston CDP (2020, 78.62%)★
- Furman (2020, 73.21%)
- Gifford (2020, 92.22%)
- Greeleyville (2020, 69.79%)
- Helena CDP (2020, 84.14%)★
- Lane (2020, 87.50%)
- Little Rock CDP (2020, 58.36%)★
- Lobeco CDP (2020, 53.08%)★
- Lynchburg (2020, 82.70%)
- Manville CDP (2020, 67.52%)★
- Mayesville (2020, 76.46%)
- Mount Carmel CDP (2020, 85.90%)
- Newtown CDP (2020, 95.58%)
- Norway (2020, 58.13%)
- Pinewood (2020, 54.67%)
- Promised Land CDP (2020, 93.39%)
- Quinby (2020, 70.05%)
- Rembert CDP (2020, 58.94%)
- Richburg (2020,71.79%)
- Ridge Spring (2020, 54.75%)
- Santee (2020, 65.87%)
- Scotia (2020, 66.46%)
- Scranton (2020, 53.09%)
- Sellers (2020, 87.76%)
- Sheldon CDP (2020, 67.36%)★
- St. Charles CDP (2020, 51.75%)
- Stuckey (2020, 73.00%)
- Summerton (2020, 52.83%)
- Vance (2020, 81.25%)
- Wagener (2020, 58.32%)
- Waterloo (2020, 62.42%)
- Wisacky CDP (2020, 96.76%)★
- Zion CDP (2020, 86.76%)★

Population under 100

- Coosawhatchie CDP (2020, 70.18%)★
- Jenkinsville (2020, 87.50%)
- Willington CDP (2020, 75.31%)

★ New jurisdiction first appearing in the 2020 Census

== Tennessee ==
Population over 500,000

- Memphis (2020, 61.28%)

Population 5,000 to 9,999

- Bolivar (2020, 63.46%)
- Brownsville (2020, 66.48%)
- Ripley (2020, 58.65%)

Population 1,000 to 5,999

- Mason (2020, 68.36%)
- Whiteville (2020, 56.45%)

Population under 1,000

- Gallaway (2020, 58.14%)★
- Grand Junction (2020, 50.00%)★
- Henning (2020, 71.30%)
- Moscow (2020, 55.59%)
- Stanton (2020, 68.59%)

★ African-American majority as of the 2020 Census

== Texas ==
Population over 50,000

- DeSoto (2020, 69.41%)

Population 25,000 to 49,999

- Cedar Hill (2020, 52.47%)
- Lancaster (2020, 65.60%)

Population 10,000 to 24,999

- Fresno CDP (2020, 55.91%)
- Glenn Heights (2020, 54.55%)★

Population 5,000 to 9,999

- Prairie View (2020, 82.01%)

Population 1,000 to 4,999

- Bear Creek Ranch CDP (2020, 80.81%)★
- San Augustine (2020, 50.42%)

Population 100 to 999

- Ames (2020, 74.71%)
- Calvert (2020, 50.10%)★
- Cuney (2020, 59.48%)
- Clay CDP (2020, 75.54%)★
- Easton (2020, 51.90%)
- Goodlow (2020, 74.72%)
- Kendleton (2020, 63.85%)
- Lakeport (2020, 50.31%)
- Moore Station (2020, 88.75%)

Population under 100

- Domino (2020, 83.10%)
- Toco (2020, 61.54%)
- Tunis CDP (2020, 78.89%)★

★New jurisdiction first appearing in the 2020 Census
★ African-American majority as of the 2020 Census

== United States Virgin Islands ==
Population 5,000 to 10,000

- Charlotte Amalie (2020, 69.26%)
- Tutu CDP (2020, 87.97%)

Population 1,000 to 4,999

- Charlotte Amalie East CDP (2020, 82.18%)
- Charlotte Amalie West CDP (2020, 68.57%)
- Christiansted (2020, 56.33%)
- Cruz Bay CDP (2020, 50.79%)
- Frederiksted Southeast CDP (2020, 75.60%)

Population under 1,000

- Frederiksted (2020, 60.61%)

== Virginia ==
Population over 50,000

- Portsmouth (2020, 52.68%)☆

Population 25,000 to 49,999

- Danville (2020, 51.03%)☆★
- Petersburg (2020, 73.32%)☆

Population 10,000 to 24,999

- East Highland Park CDP (2020, 83.13%)
- Highland Springs CDP (2020, 69.11%)

Population 5,000 to 9,999

- Chamberlayne CDP (2020, 54.74%)
- Emporia (2020, 62.97%)☆
- Ettrick CDP (2020, 68.46%)
- Franklin (2020, 56.36%)☆
- Montrose CDP (2020, 68.14%)

Population 1,000 to 4,999

- Lawrenceville (2020, 73.08%)
- Waverly (2020, 67.01%)

Population 100 to 999

- Bayside CDP (Accomack County) (2020, 77.57%)
- Boston CDP (Accomack County) (2020, 79.07%)
- Camptown CDP (2020, 58.64%)
- Cats Bridge CDP (2020, 85.87%)
- Charles City CDP (2020, 50.96%)
- Dendron (2020, 56.18%)
- Jarratt (2020, 54.60%)★
- Laurel Park CDP (2020, 64.38%)
- Makemie Park CDP (2020, 81.16%)
- Metompkin CDP (2020, 67.96%)
- Sandy Level CDP (2020, 50.43%)
- Savageville CDP (2020, 74.29%)
- Southampton Meadows CDP (2020, 79.92%)
- Warfield CDP (2020, 69.23%)
- Whitesville CDP (2020, 52.56%)

Population under 100

- Locust Mount CDP (2020, 80.77%)★
- Savage Town CDP (2020, 88.89%)

☆Independent City
★New jurisdiction first appearing in the 2020 Census
★Majority African-American effective 2020 Census

== West Virginia ==
Population under 1,000

- Keystone (2020, 57.39%)
- Kimball (2020, 53.79%)
- Northfork (2020, 60.61%)

== Counties ==
=== Alabama ===
- Bullock County (2020, 71.33%)
- Dallas County (2020, 69.71%)
- Greene County (2020, 80.56%)
- Hale County (2020, 56.23%)
- Lowndes County (2020, 69.33%)
- Macon County (2020, 78.82%)
- Marengo County (2020, 52.44%)
- Montgomery County (2020, 56.69%)
- Perry County (2020, 69.49%)
- Sumter County (2020, 72.54%)
- Wilcox County (2020, 70.05%)

=== Arkansas ===
- Chicot County (2020, 52.77%)
- Crittenden County (2020, 53.58%)
- Jefferson County (2020, 56.07%)
- Lee County (2020, 54.15%)
- Phillips County (2020, 62.20%)
- St. Francis County (2020, 54.14%)

=== Florida ===
- Gadsden County (2020, 53.22%)

=== Georgia ===
- Bibb County (2020, 54.17%)
- Calhoun County (2020, 64.04%)
- Clay County (2020, 55.93%)
- Clayton County (2020, 68.99%)
- DeKalb County (2020, 50.29%)
- Dougherty County (2020, 69.61%)
- Early County (2020, 50.99%)★
- Hancock County (2020, 68.98%)
- Jefferson County (2020, 50.74%)
- Macon County (2020, 59.18%)
- Randolph County (2020, 60.11%)
- Richmond County (2020, 54.67%)
- Rockdale County (2020, 57.48%)★
- Sumter County (2020, 50.82%)
- Talbot County (2020, 53.31%)
- Taliaferro County (2020, 53.43%)
- Terrell County (2020, 60.32%)
- Warren County (2020, 58.43%)
- Washington County (2020, 53.52%)

=== Louisiana ===
- East Carroll Parish (2020, 69.23%)
- Madison Parish (2020, 61.63%)
- Orleans Parish (2020, 53.61%)
- St. Helena Parish (2020, 53.53%)
- St. John the Baptist Parish (2020, 56.68%)
- Tensas Parish (2020, 53.82%)

=== Maryland ===
- Prince George's County (2020, 59.13%)

=== Mississippi ===
- Adams County (2020, 56.57%)
- Bolivar County (2020, 62.15%)
- Claiborne County (2020, 87.13%)
- Clay County (2020, 57.87%)
- Coahoma County (2020, 75.78%)
- Copiah County (2020, 50.28%)
- Hinds County (2020, 69.15%)
- Holmes County (2020, 83.49%)
- Humphreys County (2020, 78.00%)
- Issaquena County (2020, 55.90%)
- Jasper County (2020, 50.86%)
- Jefferson County (2020, 84.55%)
- Jefferson Davis County (2020, 58.49%)
- Kemper County (2020, 61.04%)
- Leflore County (2020, 73.43%)
- Noxubee County (2020, 69.91%)
- Pike County (2020, 53.21%)
- Quitman County (2020, 73.61%)
- Sharkey County (2020, 70.29%)
- Sunflower County (2020, 69.60%)
- Tallahatchie County (2020, 58.12%)
- Tunica County (2020, 76.35%)
- Washington County (2020, 71.05%)
- Wilkinson County (2020, 67.12%)
- Yazoo County (2020, 59.13%)

=== North Carolina ===
- Bertie County (2020, 59.52%)
- Edgecombe County (2020, 55.83%)
- Halifax County (2020, 50.88%)
- Hertford County (2020, 56.68%)
- Northampton County (2020, 55.23%)

=== South Carolina ===
- Allendale County (2020, 70.23%)
- Bamberg County (2020, 58.22%)
- Fairfield County (2020, 53.47%)
- Hampton County (2020, 51.38%)
- Lee County (2020, 60.82%)
- Marion County (2020, 55.97%)
- Orangeburg County (2020, 60.32%)
- Williamsburg County (2020, 63.11%)

=== Tennessee ===
- Haywood County (2020, 50.34%)
- Shelby County (2020, 51.10%)

=== Virginia ===
- Brunswick County (2020, 54.09%)
- Greensville County (2020, 58.08%)
- Sussex County (2020, 53.25%)

★Majority African-American effective 2020 Census

== See also ==
- List of U.S. cities with large African-American populations—over 30%, ranked by percentage
- List of African American neighborhoods
- Lists of U.S. cities with non-white majority populations
- List of largest U.S. municipalities by race/ethnicity in 2020
- List of U.S. counties with African American majority populations
