= Tamms Community High School =

School in Tamms, Illinois, United States

Tamms Community High School, later Alexander County Central High School, was a public high school in Tamms, Illinois.

It served Tamms, Elco, Hodges Park, Olive Branch, Sandusky, and Unity. In 1954 it was the high school in the county with the most students.

It was part of Tamms Community High School District No. 37. It had territory in Alexander County and Pulaski County.

== History ==
The first building was constructed in 1924, and it had 10 classrooms on three stories. Renovations occurred circa 1950-1951. In the 1952-1953 school year, Tamms High had 120 students. The school formerly did not admit African-American students, but in 1954 it began to do so. According to the principal, the school was having financial difficulties and needed extra students and therefore had that as the motive to desegregate.

That school year it also began serving some communities as their high school attendance boundaries consolidated into theirs. Therefore its student body increased to 200 by March 1954.

A gymnasium was built sometime prior to 1953. On November 27, 1953 a fire hit the school building, and the walls were the sole part not in a state of destruction. Aside from the chairs, almost all of the assets of the school were destroyed. A donation of six dictionaries initially formed the post-fire library. In response the school district began using the gymnasium to hold classes. Temporary partitions were established. At the time the enrollment was 200.

Classes were temporarily moved to the gymnasium.

== Athletics ==
The Egyptian School District high school athletic program became a joint effort between Tamms High and Thebes High School in 1964.
