= South Carolina Highway 377 =

State highway in South Carolina, United States

South Carolina Highway 377

Route information
- Maintained by SCDOT
- Length: 14.560 mi (23.432 km)
- Existed: 1949–present

Major junctions
- South end: SC 375 near Lane
- US 521 near Salters
- North end: SC 261 in Kingstree

Location
- Country: United States
- State: South Carolina
- Counties: Williamsburg

Highway system
- South Carolina State Highway System; Interstate; US; State; Scenic
← SC 375	→ US 378

South Carolina Highway 377 (SC 377) is a 14.560-mile-long (23.432 km) state highway in the U.S. state of South Carolina. The highway connects Lane and Kingstree.

== Route description ==
SC 377 begins at an intersection with SC 375 (Gordon Road) south-southwest of Lane, Williamsburg County. It travels to the north-northeast, paralleling railroad tracks, and enters the city limits of Lane. In town, it passes a U.S. Post Office. It curves to the northeast and leaves Lane. The highway has an intersection with U.S. Route 521 (US 521; Thorntree Road). Just after that intersection, it crosses over the Black River. The highway curves to the north-northeast and curves to the north-northwest. Upon entering Kingstree, SC 377 passes Kingstree Senior High School and Williamsburg Technical College. Then, it passes Williamsburg Regional Hospital. On the northwestern corner of the hospital, it intersects SC 527 (Nelson Boulevard). Two blocks later, it meets its northern terminus, an intersection with SC 261 (East Main Street).

== Major intersections ==
The entire route is in Williamsburg County.

Location	mi	km	Destinations	Notes
	0.000	0.000	SC 375 (Gordon Road) – Greeleyville, Charleston	Southern terminus
	8.370	13.470	US 521 (Thorntree Road) – Georgetown, Manning	
Kingstree	14.190	22.837	SC 527 (Nelson Boulevard) – Hemingway, Lake City, Manning	
Kingstree	14.410	23.191	Thurgood Marshall Highway south (SC 527 Conn. south) / Ashton Avenue west	Northern terminus of SC 527 Conn. and Thurgood Marshall Highway; eastern terminus of Ashton Avenue
Kingstree	14.560	23.432	SC 261 (East Main Street) – Hemingway, Florence	Northern terminus
1.000 mi = 1.609 km; 1.000 km = 0.621 mi
