= South Carolina Highway 375 =

State highway in South Carolina, United States

South Carolina Highway 375

Route information
- Maintained by SCDOT
- Length: 9.330 mi (15.015 km)
- Existed: 1949–present

Major junctions
- South end: SC 377 near Lane
- US 52 near Lane
- North end: US 521 in Greeleyville

Location
- Country: United States
- State: South Carolina
- Counties: Williamsburg

Highway system
- South Carolina State Highway System; Interstate; US; State; Scenic
← SC 363	→ SC 377

South Carolina Highway 375 (SC 375) is a 9.330-mile-long (15.015 km) state highway in the U.S. state of South Carolina. The highway connects rural areas of Williamsburg County with Greeleyville.

== Route description ==
SC 375 begins at an intersection with the southern terminus of SC 377 (Martin Luther King Jr. Avenue) south-southwest of Lane, Williamsburg County, where the roadway continues as Santee Road. It travels to the northwest and immediately crosses some railroad tracks. Then, it intersects U.S. Route 52 (US 52; South Williamsburg County Highway). It curves to the north-northwest and passes Mt. Hope Cemetery. Then, the highway enters Greeleyville, where it passes Greeleyville Elementary School. It then meets its northern terminus, an intersection with US 521 (Society Street).

== Major intersections ==
The entire route is in Williamsburg County.

Location	mi	km	Destinations	Notes
	0.000	0.000	SC 377 (Martin Luther King Jr. Avenue) – Lane, Kingstree	
	4.190	6.743	US 52 (South Williamsburg County Highway) – Kingstree, Charleston	
Greeleyville	9.330	15.015	US 521 (Society Street) – Fair Play	
1.000 mi = 1.609 km; 1.000 km = 0.621 mi
