= South Carolina Highway 527 =

Highway in South Carolina

South Carolina Highway 527

Route information
- Maintained by SCDOT
- Length: 65.940 mi (106.120 km)

Major junctions
- South end: SC 41 near Andrews
- SC 377 in Kingstree; US 52 / SC 261 in Kingstree; US 301 in Sardina; I-95 near Gable; US 378 near Mayesville; US 76 near Lynchburg; US 401 near Elliott
- North end: SC 341 in Wisacky

Location
- Country: United States
- State: South Carolina
- Counties: Williamburg, Clarendon, Sumter, Lee

Highway system
- South Carolina State Highway System; Interstate; US; State; Scenic
| ← SC 522 | → SC 541 |

South Carolina Highway 527 (SC 527) is a 65.940-mile (106.120 km) state highway in the U.S. state of South Carolina. It travels between Andrews on the Williamsburg–Georgetown county line to Lee County six miles (9.7 km) south of Bishopville. The highway travels in a southeast–northwest direction.

== Route description ==
SC 527 begins on the Williamsburg–Georgetown county line north of Andrews at SC 41. It travels northwest to Williamsburg County's seat, Kingstree where it has a brief concurrency with U.S. Route 52 (US 52). Continuing northwest into Clarendon County, it intersects US 301 and Interstate 95 (I-95) but does not pass through any incorporated municipalities in this county. It then cuts through the eastern panhandle of Sumter County, again not passing through any incorporated towns. It does intersect US 378 at the approximate midpoint through this county. SC 527 as it enters Lee County heads in a more northerly course where it intersects U.S. Routes 76 and 401. The highway ends in the unincorporated community of Wisacky, six miles (9.7 km) south of Bishopville at SC 341.

== Major intersections ==
| County | Location | mi | km | Destinations | Notes |
|---|---|---|---|---|---|
| Williamsburg–Georgetown county line | | 0.000 | 0.000 | SC 41 (County Line Road) – Hemingway, Andrews | Southern terminus |
| Williamsburg | Kingstree | 20.590 | 33.136 | Thurgood Marshall Highway north (SC 527 Conn. north) / Nelson Boulevard north | Southern terminus of SC 527 Conn., which takes on the Thurgood Marshall Highway name; SC 527 turns left, off of Thurgood Marshall Highway and onto Nelson Boulevard, which continues to the right |
| Williamsburg | Kingstree | 20.740 | 33.378 | SC 377 (M.L.K. Jr. Street) – Lane, Andrews, Williamsburg Technical College | |
| Williamsburg | Kingstree | 21.680 | 34.891 | US 52 east / SC 261 (West Main Street) – Hemingway, St. Stephen, Manning | Southern end of US 52 concurrency |
| Williamsburg | Kingstree | 22.290 | 35.872 | US 52 west (North Longstreet Street) / West Academy Street – Lake City | Northern end of US 52 concurrency |
| Clarendon | Sardinia | 42.060 | 67.689 | US 301 – Manning, Turbeville | |
| Clarendon | | 44.482– 44.610 | 71.587– 71.793 | I-95 – Florence, Savannah | I-95 exit 132 |
| Sumter | McBride Corners | 48.420 | 77.924 | US 378 (Myrtle Beach Highway) to I-95 – Turbeville, Sumter | |
| Lee | Rhodes Crossroads | 55.430 | 89.206 | US 76 – Lynchburg, Mayesville | |
| Lee | Elliott | 62.390 | 100.407 | US 401 (Darlington Highway) – Sumter, Darlington | |
| Lee | Wisacky | 65.940 | 106.120 | SC 341 (Wisacky Highway / Lynchburg Highway) to Coopers Mill Road / I-20 – Bishopville, Lynchburg | Northern terminus |
1.000 mi = 1.609 km; 1.000 km = 0.621 mi: Concurrency terminus

== Kingstree connector route ==
S.C. Highway 527 Connector
- Location: Kingstree
- Length: 0.290 mi (467 m)

South Carolina Highway 527 Connector (SC 527 Conn.) is a 0.290-mile (0.467 km) connector route of SC 527. Its entire length is unsigned. It utilizes a brief segment of Thurgood Marshall Highway in Kingstree from the SC 527 mainline to SC 377.
