= Sandusky Precinct, Illinois =

Sandusky Precinct
- Precinct
- Location of Sandusky Precinct in Alexander County
- Coordinates: 37°11′36″N 89°18′20″W
- Country: United States
- State: Illinois
- County: Alexander

Area
  - Total: 27.34 sq mi (70.8 km^{2})
  - Land: 27.34 sq mi (70.8 km^{2})
  - Water: 0.00 sq mi (0 km^{2})
- Elevation: 335 ft (102 m)

Population (2020)
  - Total: 420
  - Density: 15/sq mi (5.9/km^{2})
- GNIS feature ID: 1928642
- FIPS code: 17-003-93114

Sandusky Precinct is located in Alexander County, Illinois, United States. As of the 2020 census, its population was 420.

== Geography ==
According to the 2021 census gazetteer files, Sandusky Precinct has a total area of 27.34 square miles (70.81 km^{2}), all land.

=== Unincorporated communities ===
- Diswood
- Sandusky (mostly in Olive Branch Precinct)
- Olive Branch (part)
- Unity

== Demographics ==
As of the 2020 census there were 420 people, 135 households, and 77 families residing in the precinct. The population density was 15.36 inhabitants per square mile (5.93/km^{2}). There were 217 housing units at an average density of 7.94 per square mile (3.07/km^{2}). The racial makeup of the precinct was 57.38% White, 37.86% African American, 0.95% Native American, 0.00% Asian, 0.00% Pacific Islander, 0.00% from other races, and 3.81% from two or more races. Hispanic or Latino of any race were 2.14% of the population.

There were 135 households, out of which 11.90% had children under the age of 18 living with them, 45.19% were married couples living together, 11.85% had a female householder with no spouse present, and 42.96% were non-families. 43.00% of all households were made up of individuals, and 25.20% had someone living alone who was 65 years of age or older. The average household size was 2.26 and the average family size was 3.21.

The precinct's age distribution consisted of 13.8% under the age of 18, 0.0% from 18 to 24, 22.9% from 25 to 44, 27.9% from 45 to 64, and 35.4% who were 65 years of age or older. The median age was 56.5 years. For every 100 females, there were 88.3 males. For every 100 females age 18 and over, there were 62.3 males.

The median income for a household in the precinct was $42,557, and the median income for a family was $50,521. Males had a median income of $42,557 versus $13,750 for females. The per capita income for the precinct was $19,406. No families and 4.3% of the population were below the poverty line, including none of those under age 18 and 5.6% of those age 65 or over.
