= Tamms Precinct, Illinois =

Tamms Precinct
- Precinct
- Location of Tamms Precinct in Alexander County
- Coordinates: 37°17′31″N 89°17′40″W
- Country: United States
- State: Illinois
- County: Alexander

Area
  - Total: 51.05 sq mi (132.2 km^{2})
  - Land: 51.05 sq mi (132.2 km^{2})
  - Water: 0.01 sq mi (0.026 km^{2})
- Elevation: 512 ft (156 m)

Population (2020)
  - Total: 899
  - Density: 17.6/sq mi (6.80/km^{2})
- GNIS feature ID: 1928658
- FIPS code: 17-003-93402

Tamms Precinct is one of the seven precincts, or county divisions, in Alexander County, Illinois, United States. As of the 2020 census, its population was 899.

== Geography ==
According to the 2021 census gazetteer files, Tamms Precinct has a total area of 51.05 square miles (132.22 km^{2}), of which 51.05 square miles (132.22 km^{2}) (or 99.99%) is land and 0.01 square miles (0.03 km^{2}) (or 0.01%) is water.

=== Villages ===
- Tamms

=== Unincorporated communities ===
- Elco

== Demographics ==
As of the 2020 census there were 899 people, 369 households, and 252 families residing in the precinct. The population density was 17.61 inhabitants per square mile (6.80/km^{2}). There were 491 housing units at an average density of 9.62 per square mile (3.71/km^{2}). The racial makeup of the precinct was 80.65% White, 15.46% African American, 0.56% Native American, 0.44% Asian, 0.00% Pacific Islander, 0.00% from other races, and 2.89% from two or more races. Hispanic or Latino of any race were 1.56% of the population.

There were 369 households, out of which 18.70% had children under the age of 18 living with them, 52.85% were married couples living together, 10.30% had a female householder with no spouse present, and 31.71% were non-families. 26.80% of all households were made up of individuals, and 8.90% had someone living alone who was 65 years of age or older. The average household size was 3.00 and the average family size was 3.77.

The precinct's age distribution consisted of 15.1% under the age of 18, 6.2% from 18 to 24, 18.6% from 25 to 44, 36.1% from 45 to 64, and 24.0% who were 65 years of age or older. The median age was 50.2 years. For every 100 females, there were 121.0 males. For every 100 females age 18 and over, there were 108.8 males.

The median income for a household in the precinct was $45,341, and the median income for a family was $53,000. Males had a median income of $41,563 versus $33,015 for females. The per capita income for the precinct was $19,763. About 19.4% of families and 26.3% of the population were below the poverty line, including 11.3% of those under age 18 and 23.6% of those age 65 or over.
