= Olive Branch Precinct, Illinois =

Olive Branch Precinct
- Precinct
- Location of Olive Branch Precinct in Alexander County
- Coordinates: 37°09′36″N 89°22′08″W
- Country: United States
- State: Illinois
- County: Alexander

Area
  - Total: 21.61 sq mi (56.0 km^{2})
  - Land: 18.37 sq mi (47.6 km^{2})
  - Water: 3.24 sq mi (8.4 km^{2})
- Elevation: 331 ft (101 m)

Population (2020)
  - Total: 647
  - Density: 35.2/sq mi (13.6/km^{2})
- GNIS feature ID: 1928583
- FIPS code: 17-003-92304

Olive Branch Precinct is located in Alexander County, Illinois, United States. As of the 2020 census, its population was 647.

== Geography ==
According to the 2021 census gazetteer files, Olive Branch Precinct has a total area of 21.61 square miles (55.97 km^{2}), of which 18.37 square miles (47.58 km^{2}) (or 85.03%) is land and 3.24 square miles (8.39 km^{2}) (or 14.97%) is water.

=== Unincorporated communities ===
- Clank
- Olive Branch (mostly)

== Demographics ==
As of the 2020 census there were 647 people, 212 households, and 161 families residing in the precinct. The population density was 29.94 inhabitants per square mile (11.56/km^{2}). There were 329 housing units at an average density of 15.23 per square mile (5.88/km^{2}). The racial makeup of the precinct was 91.04% White, 0.15% African American, 0.46% Native American, 0.00% Asian, 0.00% Pacific Islander, 0.31% from other races, and 8.04% from two or more races. Hispanic or Latino of any race were 0.93% of the population.

There were 212 households, out of which 28.30% had children under the age of 18 living with them, 59.43% were married couples living together, 10.38% had a female householder with no spouse present, and 24.06% were non-families. 23.10% of all households were made up of individuals, and 20.80% had someone living alone who was 65 years of age or older. The average household size was 2.85 and the average family size was 3.42.

The precinct's age distribution consisted of 25.1% under the age of 18, 4.3% from 18 to 24, 19.8% from 25 to 44, 32% from 45 to 64, and 18.8% who were 65 years of age or older. The median age was 45.2 years. For every 100 females, there were 75.9 males. For every 100 females age 18 and over, there were 71.6 males.

The median income for a household in the precinct was $46,786, and the median income for a family was $47,411. Males had a median income of $31,929 versus $39,583 for females. The per capita income for the precinct was $18,649. About 19.3% of families and 24.0% of the population were below the poverty line, including 32.2% of those under age 18 and 17.5% of those age 65 or over.
