= List of South Carolina state forests =

This is a list of state forests in South Carolina.

== South Carolina state forests ==
Name (by alphabetical order)	Location (of main entrance)
Harbison State Forest	Columbia
Manchester State Forest	Wedgefield
Poe Creek State Forest	Pickens County
Sand Hills State Forest	Chesterfield County
Wee Tee State Forest	Georgetown County

== See also ==
- List of national forests of the United States
