= Salters, South Carolina =

Unincorporated community in South Carolina, US

Coordinates: 33°35′55″N 79°51′05″W

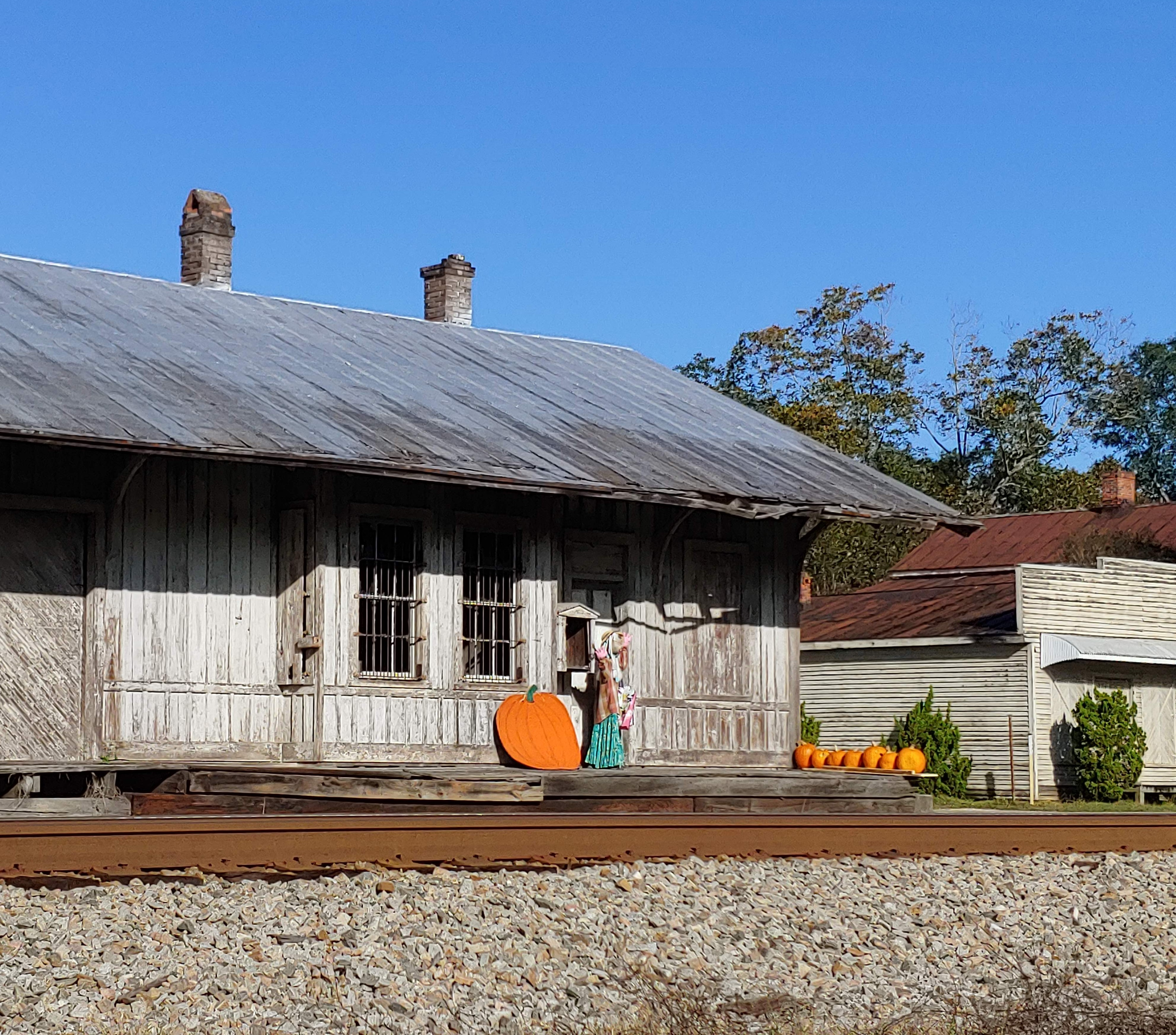
Historic train station in Salters, S.C.

Salters is a small unincorporated community in the southwest central portion of Williamsburg County, South Carolina, United States, in the state's Low Country region. The zip code is 29590 and the area code is 843. Charleston, South Carolina and Myrtle Beach, South Carolina are within driving distance of Salters making for an enjoyable day trip to either. Forestry is the main industry in Williamsburg County. Nearby towns include Kingstree, Greeleyville, and Lane. Salters is the location of Federal Correctional Institution, Williamsburg. The Salters Plantation House was listed on the National Register of Historic Places in 2000.
