= Wee Tee State Forest =

State forest in South Carolina, United States

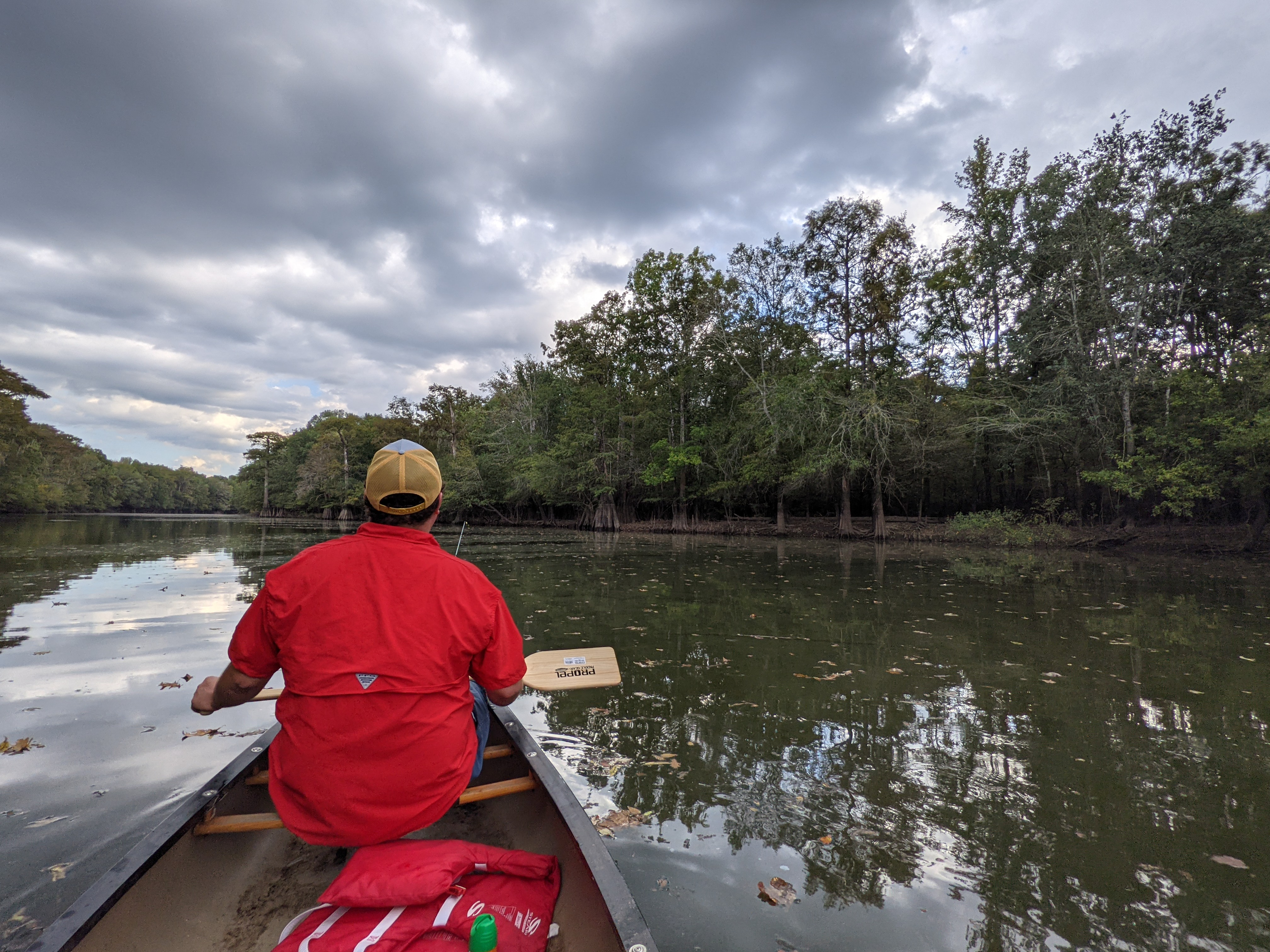
- Wittee Lake in Wee Tee State Forest
- Interactive map of Wee Tee State Forest
- Location: Williamsburg County, South Carolina, Georgetown County, South Carolina
- Nearest city: Andrews, South Carolina
- Coordinates: 33.36°N 79.75°W
- Area: 12,403 acres (50.19 km^{2})
- Governing body: South Carolina Forestry Commission
- Website: https://www.scfc.gov/state-lands/wee-tee-state-forest/

Wee Tee State Forest is a State Forest in Georgetown County, South Carolina, and Williamsburg County, South Carolina. Purchased in 2004, the forest consists mainly of bottomland hardwood forest set in the Santee River floodplain.

It has 12 mi (19 km) of river front and includes a 200 acres (81 ha) lake with various oxbows and ponds.
