= Unity, Illinois =

Unity, Illinois Hodges Park Station
- Unincorporated community Census-designated place
- Location within Illinois Location within the United States
- Coordinates: 37°08′59″N 89°16′22″W
- Country: United States
- State: Illinois
- County: Alexander
- Precinct: Sandusky

Area
  - Total: 0.70 sq mi (1.82 km^{2})
  - Land: 0.70 sq mi (1.82 km^{2})
  - Water: 0 sq mi (0.00 km^{2})
- Elevation: 335 ft (102 m)

Population (2020)
  - Total: 98
  - Density: 139.7/sq mi (53.95/km^{2})
- Time zone: UTC-6 (Central (CST))
  - Summer (DST): UTC-5 (CDT)
- ZIP Code(s): 62988
- Area code: 618
- GNIS feature ID: 425589

Unity, also known as Hodges Park Station, is an unincorporated community and census-designated place in Sandusky Precinct, Alexander County, Illinois, United States. Illinois Route 127 passes by Unity south of Tamms. The population as of the 2020 census was 98.

== Geography ==
According to the 2021 census gazetteer files, Unity has a total area of 0.70 square miles (1.81 km^{2}), all land.

== Demographics ==
Unity first appeared as a census designated place in the 2020 U.S. census.

=== 2020 census ===
Unity CDP, Illinois – Racial and ethnic composition Note: the US Census treats Hispanic/Latino as an ethnic category. This table excludes Latinos from the racial categories and assigns them to a separate category. Hispanics/Latinos may be of any race.
Race / Ethnicity (NH = Non-Hispanic)	Pop 2020	% 2020
White alone (NH)	14	14.29%
Black or African American alone (NH)	75	76.53%
Native American or Alaska Native alone (NH)	0	0.00%
Asian alone (NH)	0	0.00%
Pacific Islander alone (NH)	0	0.00%
Other race alone (NH)	0	0.00%
Mixed race or Multiracial (NH)	4	4.08%
Hispanic or Latino (any race)	5	5.10%
Total	98	100.00%

As of the 2020 census there were 98 people, 25 households, and 13 families residing in the CDP. The population density was 139.80 inhabitants per square mile (53.98/km^{2}). There were 54 housing units at an average density of 77.03 per square mile (29.74/km^{2}). The racial makeup of the CDP was 17.35% White, 77.55% African American, 0.00% Native American, 0.00% Asian, 0.00% Pacific Islander, 0.00% from other races, and 5.10% from two or more races. Hispanic or Latino of any race were 5.10% of the population.

There were 25 households, none with children under the age of 18 living with them. 52.00% of households were married couples living together. 48.00% of all households were made up of individuals, and 20.00% had someone living alone who was 65 years of age or older. The average household size was 3.85 and the average family size was 2.48.

The CDP's age distribution consisted of none under the age of 18, none from 18 to 24, 25.8% from 25 to 44, 11.3% from 45 to 64, and 62.9% who were 65 years of age or older. The median age was 66.5 years. For every 100 females, there were 148.0 males. For every 100 females age 18 and over, there were 148.0 males.

The median income for a household in the CDP was $59,464; the per capita income was $30,961. No families, and 11.3% of the population were below the poverty line.

Historical population
Census	Pop.	Note	%±
2020	98		—
U.S. Decennial Census

== Education ==
Residents are zoned to the Egyptian School District.

== See also ==
- List of U.S. communities with African-American majority populations in Illinois in 2020
