= Egyptian Community Unit School District 5 =

School district in Alexander County, Illinois, United States

Address
- 20023 Diswood Road Tamms, Illinois, 62988; United States

District information
- Type: Public
- Grades: PreK–12
- NCES District ID: 1713590

Students and staff
- Students: 383 (2020–2021)

Other information
- Website: www.egyptianschool.com

Egyptian Community Unit School District 5, also known locally as Egyptian School District or CUSD #5, is a unified school district headquartered in unincorporated Alexander County, Illinois, with a Tamms postal address. As of 2026 Carie Arbuckle is the principal for all grades serviced by the district. The school district is composed of Egyptian Elementary School, Egyptian Middle School, and Egyptian Senior High School.

The district includes the municipalities and census-designated places of Tamms, Olive Branch, Thebes, and Unity. It also includes unincorporated areas of Elco and Sandusky. In addition to Alexander County, it includes a small part of Pulaski County.

== History ==
It was created on July 1, 1963 by the consolidation of six school districts. Initially the district had eight different school buildings.

The Egyptian School District high school athletic program became a joint effort between Tamms Community High School and Thebes High School in 1964.

The district spent $20,000 to buy land for new centralized facilities with the location chosen to approximate that of the geographic center and that central to the distribution of the students. In October 1966, construction started, and opening occurred in 1968.

In 2007, the district received a $45,260 grant intended to expand teaching of other languages and other courses in the arts fields.

In 2011, the school received a federal grant to improve test scores, which at the time were among the lowest in Illinois.

== Campus ==
The campus, located south of the community of Diswood, is on 40 acres (16 ha) of land and has a total of 84,000 square feet (7,800 m^{2}) building space. The elementary and secondary classroom buildings, on the southern and western parts of the campus, respectively, have the shape of a circle. The 1,400-seat gymnasium is in the north end; the stage is on the north face and there are six basketball goals and two basketball courts. The 270-seat cafeteria is by the main entrance.
