= Sandusky, Illinois =

- Unincorporated community
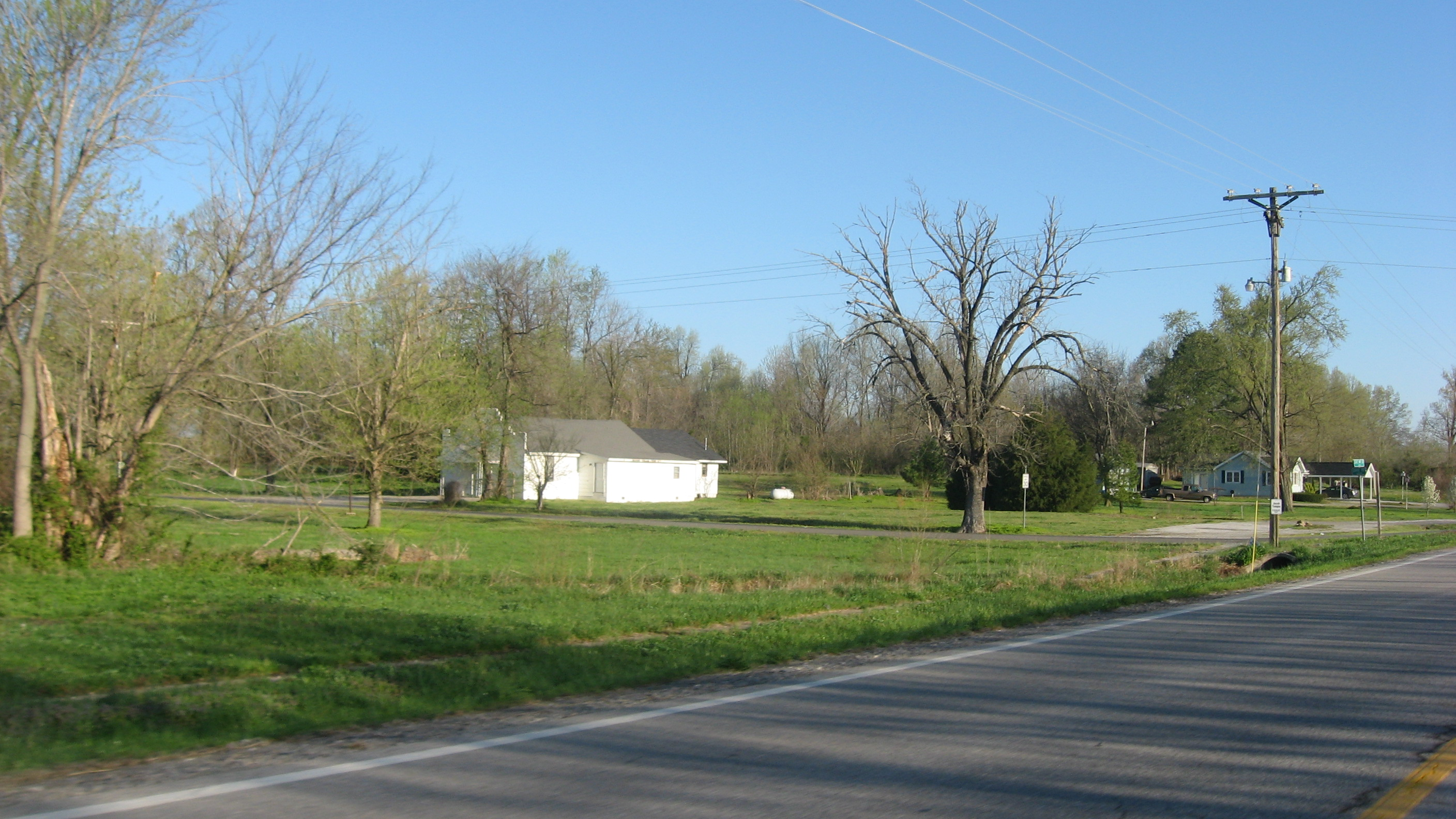
- View along Route 127

- Location within Illinois Location within the United States
- Coordinates: 37°12′09″N 89°16′20″W
- Country: United States
- State: Illinois
- County: Alexander
- Elevation: 341 ft (104 m)
- Time zone: UTC-6 (Central (CST))
  - Summer (DST): UTC-5 (CDT)
- Area code: 618
- GNIS feature ID: 425447

Sandusky is an unincorporated community in Alexander County, Illinois, United States. Sandusky is located along Illinois Route 127, south of Tamms. Its elevation is 341 feet and is in the Central Time Zone.

== Education ==
It is in the Egyptian School District.
