= Wisacky, South Carolina =

- Census-designated place
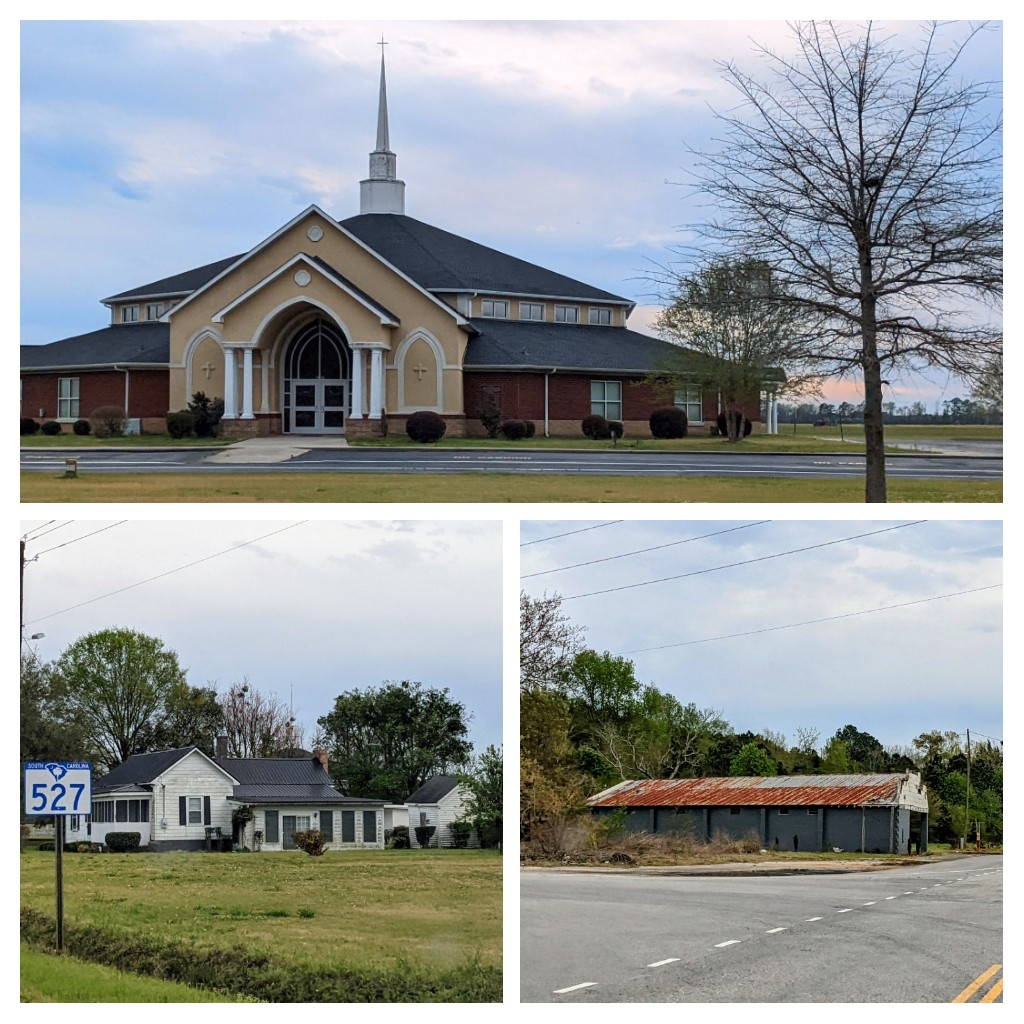
- Buildings in Wisacky

- Location within South Carolina Location within the United States
- Coordinates: 34°08′18″N 80°11′52″W
- Country: United States
- State: South Carolina
- County: Lee

Area
  - Total: 5.54 sq mi (14.34 km^{2})
  - Land: 5.53 sq mi (14.33 km^{2})
  - Water: 0.0039 sq mi (0.01 km^{2})
- Elevation: 187 ft (57 m)

Population (2020)
  - Total: 185
  - Density: 33.4/sq mi (12.91/km^{2})
- Time zone: UTC-5 (Eastern (EST))
  - Summer (DST): UTC-4 (EDT)
- ZIP Code: 29010 (Bishopville)
- Area codes: 803/839
- FIPS code: 45-78640
- GNIS feature ID: 2807068

Wisacky is an unincorporated community and census-designated place (CDP) in Lee County, South Carolina, United States. It was first listed as a CDP prior to the 2020 census with a population of 185.

The CDP is in eastern Lee County, centered on the junction of South Carolina Highways 341 and 527. Highway 341 leads northwest 6 miles (10 km) to Bishopville, the county seat, and southeast 9 miles (14 km) to Lynchburg, while Highway 527 leads south-southeast 44 miles (71 km) to Kingstree.

== Demographics ==
Historical population
Census	Pop.	Note	%±
2020	185		—
U.S. Decennial Census; 2020

Wisacky first appeared as a census designated place in the 2020 U.S. census.

=== 2020 census ===
Wisacky CDP, South Carolina – Demographic Profile (NH = Non-Hispanic) Note: the US Census treats Hispanic/Latino as an ethnic category. This table excludes Latinos from the racial categories and assigns them to a separate category. Hispanics/Latinos may be of any race.
Race / Ethnicity	Pop 2020	% 2020
White alone (NH)	6	3.24%
Black or African American alone (NH)	179	96.76%
Native American or Alaska Native alone (NH)	0	0.00%
Asian alone (NH)	0	0.00%
Pacific Islander alone (NH)	0	0.00%
Some Other Race alone (NH)	0	0.00%
Mixed Race/Multi-Racial (NH)	0	0.00%
Hispanic or Latino (any race)	0	0.00%
Total	185	100.00%
