= Elliott, South Carolina =

- Census-designated place
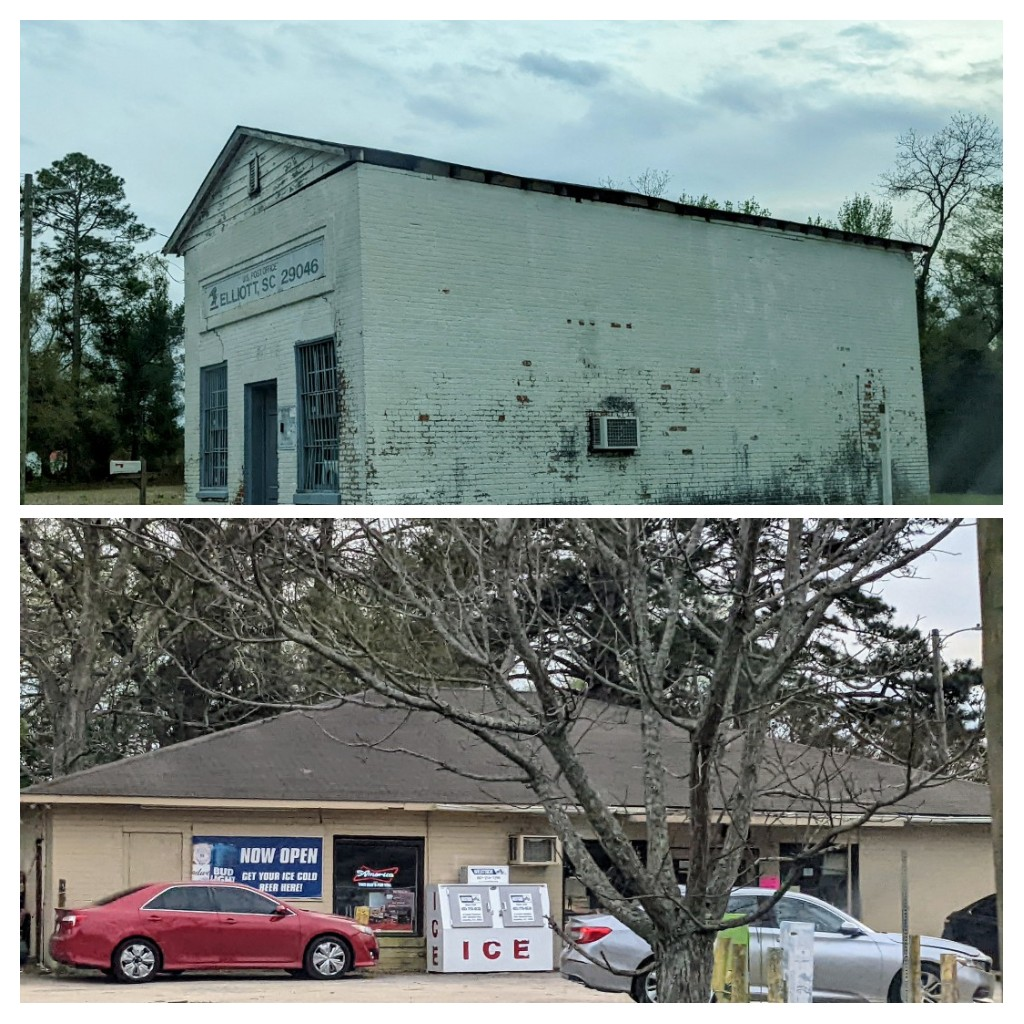
- Buildings in Elliott

- Location within South Carolina Location within the United States
- Coordinates: 34°06′31″N 80°10′13″W
- Country: United States
- State: South Carolina
- County: Lee

Area
  - Total: 1.86 sq mi (4.82 km^{2})
  - Land: 1.85 sq mi (4.80 km^{2})
  - Water: 0.0039 sq mi (0.01 km^{2})
- Elevation: 171 ft (52 m)

Population (2020)
  - Total: 370
  - Density: 199.6/sq mi (77.05/km^{2})
- Time zone: UTC-5 (Eastern (EST))
  - Summer (DST): UTC-4 (EDT)
- ZIP code: 29046
- Area codes: 803, 839
- GNIS feature ID: 2812974

Elliott is an unincorporated community and census-designated place (CDP) in Lee County, South Carolina, United States. It was first listed as a CDP in the 2020 census with a population of 370.

The community is located at the junction of U.S. Route 401 and South Carolina Highway 527, 9 miles (14 km) south-southeast of Bishopville. Elliott has a post office with ZIP code 29046, which opened on March 20, 1888.

== Demographics ==
Historical population
Census	Pop.	Note	%±
2020	370		—
U.S. Decennial Census; 2020

Elliot first appeared as a census designated place in the 2020 U.S. census.

=== 2020 census ===
Elliott CDP, South Carolina –– Racial and Ethnic Composition (NH = Non-Hispanic) Note: the US Census treats Hispanic/Latino as an ethnic category. This table excludes Latinos from the racial categories and assigns them to a separate category. Hispanics/Latinos may be of any race.
Race / Ethnicity	Pop 2020	% 2020
White alone (NH)	36	9.73%
Black or African American alone (NH)	317	85.68%
Native American or Alaska Native alone (NH)	0	0.00%
Asian alone (NH)	0	0.00%
Pacific Islander alone (NH)	0	0.00%
Some Other Race alone (NH)	1	0.27%
Mixed Race/Multi-Racial (NH)	7	1.89%
Hispanic or Latino (any race)	9	2.43%
Total	370	100.00%
