= Stuckey, South Carolina =

- Town
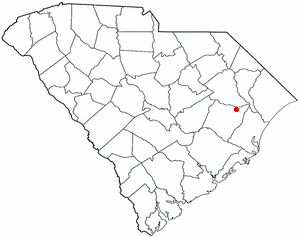
- Location of Stuckey, South Carolina
- Coordinates: 33°43′56″N 79°30′47″W
- Country: United States
- State: South Carolina
- County: Williamsburg

Area
  - Total: 0.93 sq mi (2.42 km^{2})
  - Land: 0.93 sq mi (2.42 km^{2})
  - Water: 0 sq mi (0.00 km^{2})
- Elevation: 49 ft (15 m)

Population (2020)
  - Total: 200
  - Density: 214.0/sq mi (82.61/km^{2})
- Time zone: UTC-5 (Eastern (EST))
  - Summer (DST): UTC-4 (EDT)
- ZIP code: 29554
- Area codes: 843, 854
- FIPS code: 45-70045
- GNIS feature ID: 2406675
- Website: https://www.townofstuckey.com/

Stuckey is a town in Williamsburg County, South Carolina, United States. As of the 2020 census, Stuckey had a population of 200.

== Geography ==
According to the United States Census Bureau, the town has a total area of 0.9 square miles (2.3 km^{2}), all of it land.

== Demographics ==
Historical population
Census	Pop.	Note	%±
1960	199		—
1970	193		−3.0%
1980	222		15.0%
1990	311		40.1%
2000	263		−15.4%
2010	245		−6.8%
2020	200		−18.4%
U.S. Decennial Census

=== 2020 census ===
Stuckey town, South Carolina – Racial and ethnic composition Note: the US Census treats Hispanic/Latino as an ethnic category. This table excludes Latinos from the racial categories and assigns them to a separate category. Hispanics/Latinos may be of any race.
Race / Ethnicity (NH = Non-Hispanic)	Pop 2000	Pop 2010	Pop 2020	% 2000	% 2010	% 2020
White alone (NH)	45	44	42	17.11%	17.96%	21.00%
Black or African American alone (NH)	209	198	146	79.47%	80.82%	73.00%
Native American or Alaska Native alone (NH)	0	0	0	0.00%	0.00%	0.00%
Asian alone (NH)	5	0	0	1.90%	0.00%	0.00%
Native Hawaiian or Pacific Islander alone (NH)	0	0	0	0.00%	0.00%	0.00%
Other race alone (NH)	0	0	1	0.00%	0.00%	0.50%
Mixed race or Multiracial (NH)	2	2	8	0.76%	0.82%	4.00%
Hispanic or Latino (any race)	2	1	3	0.76%	0.41%	1.50%
Total	263	245	200	100.00%	100.00%	100.00%

=== 2000 census ===
As of the census of 2000, there were 263 people, 100 households, and 72 families residing in the town. The population density was 287.7 inhabitants per square mile (111.1/km^{2}). There were 113 housing units at an average density of 123.6 units per square mile (47.7 units/km^{2}). The racial makeup of the town was 17.11% White, 79.47% African American, 1.90% Asian, 0.76% from other races, and 0.76% from two or more races. Hispanic or Latino of any race were 0.76% of the population.

There were 100 households, out of which 34.0% had children under the age of 18 living with them, 49.0% were married couples living together, 18.0% had a female householder with no husband present, and 28.0% were non-families. 27.0% of all households were made up of individuals, and 12.0% had someone living alone who was 65 years of age or older. The average household size was 2.63 and the average family size was 3.19.

In the town, the population was spread out, with 27.4% under the age of 18, 5.3% from 18 to 24, 24.7% from 25 to 44, 28.5% from 45 to 64, and 14.1% who were 65 years of age or older. The median age was 40 years. For every 100 females, there were 78.9 males. For every 100 females age 18 and over, there were 78.5 males.

The median income for a household in the town was $26,250, and the median income for a family was $36,250. Males had a median income of $27,083 versus $20,469 for females. The per capita income for the town was $13,058. About 13.1% of families and 16.7% of the population were below the poverty line, including 22.3% of those under the age of eighteen and 20.0% of those 65 or over.
