= Williamsburg County, South Carolina =

- County
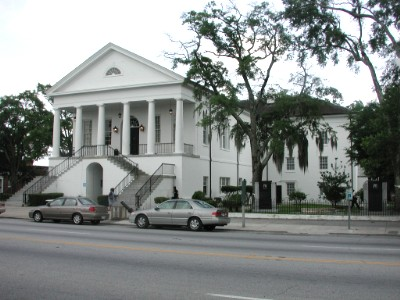
- Williamsburg County Courthouse

- Seal Logo

- Location within the U.S. state of South Carolina
- Coordinates: 33.63°N 79.72°W
- Country: United States
- State: South Carolina
- Founded: 1785
- Named for: William of Orange
- Seat: Kingstree
- Largest community: Kingstree

Area
  - Total: 937.05 sq mi (2,426.9 km^{2})
  - Land: 934.17 sq mi (2,419.5 km^{2})
  - Water: 2.88 sq mi (7.5 km^{2}) 0.31%

Population (2020)
  - Total: 31,026
  - Estimate (2025): 29,662 ▼
  - Density: 33.212/sq mi (12.823/km^{2})
- Time zone: UTC−5 (Eastern)
  - Summer (DST): UTC−4 (EDT)
- Congressional district: 6th
- Website: www.williamsburgcounty.sc.gov

Williamsburg County is a county located in the U.S. state of South Carolina. As of the 2020 census its population was 31,026. The county seat and largest community is Kingstree. After a previous incarnation of Williamsburg County, the current county was created in 1804.

== History ==
On January 7, 1867, the Kingstree jail fire killed 22 imprisoned freedmen. Also in 1867, the United States military oversaw the registering of voters in the county in preparation for the election of a new "reconstruction" government. In the Williamsburg District, there were 800 whites and 1,725 African-Americans who were eligible to vote under the new system. A convention was held to organize a new constitutions for the state of South Carolina, the Williamsburg District was represented by William Darrington who was a white reverend from the Williamsburg District who had opposed slavery before the war as well as C.M. Olsen and Stephen A. Swails, who were both African-American. Darrington led a prayer at the opening of the convention on February 14, 1868.

In 1868, the state constitution abolished the parishes and designated judicial districts formally as counties thus transforming the "Williamsburg District" into "Williamsburg County."

In 1868, an election was held in which all men older than 21 years of age who had never been convicted of committing a felony nor were "prohibited on account of service under Confederate Government" were allowed to vote. This was a form of direct democratic election which had been set up by the reconstruction government of South Carolina. Almost all voters in this election were African American. No one who fought for the Confederacy was allowed to vote in the election. Many African-American officials were elected. Stephen A. Swails was an educated black man from Pennsylvania who had fought in the U.S. military in the 54th Massachusetts Infantry Regiment during the civil war, and who was elected to represent Williamsburg County in the South Carolina State Senate. F.H. Frost, J. Pendergrass and Fortune Guilds were three black men chosen to represent Williamsburg County in the South Carolina State House of Representatives. F. H. Frost was a black man elected as school commissioner. F.H. Swails was a black man elected as an auditor of Williamsburg County. C. Rasted and F.H. Frost were two black men who were elected as the assessors for Williamsburg County's county government. W.W. Ward was a white abolitionist from Massachusetts who was elected to be the sheriff of Williamsburg County, F.C. Cooper was a white abolitionist Quaker from Pennsylvania who was elected to be the clerk of the court of Williamsburg County and C.H. Pettingil, a Union Army officer from Boston, Massachusetts and former member of the Massachusetts Abolition Society who was elected as Williamsburg County's state constable representing the county in South Carolina's state government. In all of these elections local whites from South Carolina who had, by coincidence, not fought in the confederate military did run, however every single one of them lost. Every single man elected from Williamsburg County in this election was a member of the Republican Party.

During this time, State Senator Stephen A. Swails also served as the mayor of Kingstree from 1868 until 1878. While mayor, Swails published and edited a newspaper called the Williamsburg Republican, he also started a law firm. Swails became the most prominent member of the South Carolina senate, the president pro tempore, placing him in control of all bills that passed through the state legislature. Committed to universal education, he played a critical part in transforming The South Carolina College from a school for planter elite into the integrated University of South Carolina.

On September 17, 2023, a Marine Corps F-35 stealth fighter jet crashed in rural Williamsburg County after the plane malfunctioned and the pilot ejected and parachuted to safety.

== Geography ==
Interactive map of Williamsburg County

According to the U.S. Census Bureau, the county has a total area of 937.05 square miles (2,426.9 km^{2}), of which 934.17 square miles (2,419.5 km^{2}) is land and 2.88 square miles (7.5 km^{2}) (0.31%) is water.

=== State and local protected areas ===
- Moore Farms Botanical Garden (part)
- Wee Tee State Forest (part)
- Wee Tee Wildlife Management Area

=== Major water bodies ===
- Black Mingo Swamp
- Black River
- Great Pee Dee River
- Lake Swamp
- Muddy Creek
- Santee River
- Singleton Swamp

=== Adjacent counties ===
- Florence County – north
- Marion County – northeast
- Georgetown County – east
- Berkeley County – south
- Clarendon County – west

=== Major highways ===
- US 52
- US 378
- US 521
- US 521 Bus.
- SC 41
- SC 41 Bus.
- SC 51
- SC 261
- SC 375
- SC 377
- SC 512
- SC 513
- SC 527
- SC 527 Conn.

=== Major infrastructure ===
- Kingstree Station
- Williamsburg Regional Airport

== Demographics ==
Historical population
| Census | Pop. | Note | %± |
|---|---|---|---|
| 1810 | 6,871 | | — |
| 1820 | 8,716 | | 26.9% |
| 1830 | 9,018 | | 3.5% |
| 1840 | 10,327 | | 14.5% |
| 1850 | 12,447 | | 20.5% |
| 1860 | 15,489 | | 24.4% |
| 1870 | 15,489 | | 0.0% |
| 1880 | 24,110 | | 55.7% |
| 1890 | 27,777 | | 15.2% |
| 1900 | 31,685 | | 14.1% |
| 1910 | 37,626 | | 18.8% |
| 1920 | 38,539 | | 2.4% |
| 1930 | 34,914 | | −9.4% |
| 1940 | 41,011 | | 17.5% |
| 1950 | 43,807 | | 6.8% |
| 1960 | 40,932 | | −6.6% |
| 1970 | 34,243 | | −16.3% |
| 1980 | 38,226 | | 11.6% |
| 1990 | 36,815 | | −3.7% |
| 2000 | 37,217 | | 1.1% |
| 2010 | 34,423 | | −7.5% |
| 2020 | 31,026 | | −9.9% |
| 2025 (est.) | 29,662 | ▼ | −4.4% |
U.S. Decennial Census; 1790–1960 1900–1990; 1990–2000 2010 2020

=== Racial and ethnic composition ===
Williamsburg County, South Carolina – Racial and ethnic composition Note: the US Census treats Hispanic/Latino as an ethnic category. This table excludes Latinos from the racial categories and assigns them to a separate category. Hispanics/Latinos may be of any race.
| Race / Ethnicity (NH = Non-Hispanic) | Pop 1980 | Pop 1990 | Pop 2000 | Pop 2010 | Pop 2020 | % 1980 | % 1990 | % 2000 | % 2010 | % 2020 |
|---|---|---|---|---|---|---|---|---|---|---|
| White alone (NH) | 14,298 | 13,082 | 12,101 | 10,725 | 9,986 | 37.40% | 35.53% | 32.51% | 31.16% | 32.19% |
| Black or African American alone (NH) | 23,139 | 23,560 | 24,546 | 22,526 | 19,579 | 60.53% | 64.00% | 65.95% | 65.44% | 63.11% |
| Native American or Alaska Native alone (NH) | 11 | 15 | 59 | 102 | 85 | 0.03% | 0.04% | 0.16% | 0.30% | 0.27% |
| Asian alone (NH) | 21 | 25 | 73 | 137 | 147 | 0.05% | 0.07% | 0.20% | 0.40% | 0.47% |
| Native Hawaiian or Pacific Islander alone (NH) | x | x | 0 | 3 | 1 | x | x | 0.00% | 0.01% | 0.00% |
| Other race alone (NH) | 0 | 4 | 12 | 29 | 61 | 0.00% | 0.01% | 0.03% | 0.08% | 0.20% |
| Mixed race or Multiracial (NH) | x | x | 153 | 212 | 548 | x | x | 0.41% | 0.62% | 1.77% |
| Hispanic or Latino (any race) | 757 | 129 | 273 | 689 | 619 | 1.98% | 0.35% | 0.73% | 2.00% | 2.00% |
| Total | 38,226 | 36,815 | 37,217 | 34,423 | 31,026 | 100.00% | 100.00% | 100.00% | 100.00% | 100.00% |

=== 2020 census ===
As of the 2020 census, there were 31,026 people, 12,686 households, and 8,066 families residing in the county. The median age was 45.7 years, 19.6% of residents were under the age of 18, and 22.1% were 65 years of age or older. For every 100 females there were 96.1 males, and for every 100 females age 18 and over there were 94.6 males age 18 and over.

The racial makeup of the county was 33.0% White, 63.4% Black or African American, 0.3% American Indian and Alaska Native, 0.5% Asian, 0.0% Native Hawaiian and Pacific Islander, 0.7% from some other race, and 2.0% from two or more races. Hispanic or Latino residents of any race comprised 2.0% of the population.

16.9% of residents lived in urban areas, while 83.1% lived in rural areas.

There were 12,547 households in the county, of which 26.8% had children under the age of 18 living with them and 39.5% had a female householder with no spouse or partner present. About 33.0% of all households were made up of individuals and 16.2% had someone living alone who was 65 years of age or older. There were 14,737 housing units, of which 14.9% were vacant. Among occupied housing units, 74.5% were owner-occupied and 25.5% were renter-occupied. The homeowner vacancy rate was 0.9% and the rental vacancy rate was 5.0%.

=== 2010 census ===
At the 2010 census, there were 34,423 people, 13,007 households, and 8,854 families living in the county. The population density was 36.8 inhabitants per square mile (14.2/km^{2}). There were 15,359 housing units at an average density of 16.4 units per square mile (6.3 units/km^{2}). The racial makeup of the county was 65.8% black or African American, 31.8% white, 0.4% Asian, 0.3% American Indian, 1.0% from other races, and 0.8% from two or more races. Those of Hispanic or Latino origin made up 2.0% of the population. In terms of ancestry, and 4.6% were American.

Of the 13,007 households, 33.2% had children under the age of 18 living with them, 40.0% were married couples living together, 23.0% had a female householder with no husband present, 31.9% were non-families, and 29.0% of all households were made up of individuals. The average household size was 2.53 and the average family size was 3.13. The median age was 40.2 years.

The median income for a household in the county was $24,191 and the median income for a family was $33,705. Males had a median income of $37,678 versus $22,303 for females. The per capita income for the county was $13,513. About 26.5% of families and 32.9% of the population were below the poverty line, including 45.6% of those under age 18 and 27.5% of those age 65 or over.

=== 2000 census ===
At the 2000 census, there were 37,217 people, 13,714 households, and 10,052 families living in the county. The population density was 40 people per square mile (15 people/km^{2}). There were 15,552 housing units at an average density of 17 units per square mile (6.6 units/km^{2}). The racial makeup of the county was 66.26% Black or African American, 32.74% White, 0.16% Native American, 0.20% Asian, 0.16% from other races, and 0.48% from two or more races. 0.73% of the population were Hispanic or Latino of any race.

There were 13,714 households, out of which 34.50% had children under the age of 18 living with them, 46.30% were married couples living together, 22.40% had a female householder with no husband present, and 26.70% were non-families. 24.90% of all households were made up of individuals, and 10.40% had someone living alone who was 65 years of age or older. The average household size was 2.69 and the average family size was 3.22.

In the county, the population was spread out, with 28.60% under the age of 18, 9.00% from 18 to 24, 25.70% from 25 to 44, 23.60% from 45 to 64, and 13.00% who were 65 years of age or older. The median age was 36 years. For every 100 females there were 87.90 males. For every 100 females age 18 and over, there were 81.50 males.

The median income for a household in the county was $24,214, and the median income for a family was $30,379. Males had a median income of $26,680 versus $18,202 for females. The per capita income for the county was $12,794. About 23.70% of families and 27.90% of the population were below the poverty line, including 36.10% of those under age 18 and 25.90% of those age 65 or over.

== Law and government ==
=== Law enforcement ===
In 2015, Sheriff Michael Johnson was charged with conspiracy to commit wire fraud, and sentenced to 30 months imprisonment. Johnson, with a co-conspirator, filed false reports of identity theft in order to raise individuals' credit scores, in exchange for up to a thousand dollars in payment.

On March 12, 2025, Governor McMasters suspended Sheriff Stephen Renard Gardner after being indicted on multiple financial crimes by the State Attorney General's Office on charges including "criminal conspiracy, misconduct in office and money laundering (value $20,000 or greater but less than $100,000)".

=== Politics ===
Prior to 1948, Williamsburg County was a Democratic Party stronghold similar to the rest of the Solid South, with Democratic presidential candidates receiving near-unanimous margins of victory in most years. The twenty years from 1948 to 1968 were a highly transitional time for the politics of South Carolina & Williamsburg County, largely in part due to the Democratic Party's increasing support for African-American civil rights & enfranchisement. Dixiecrats managed to carry the county twice, while Republicans managed to carry the county three times in this timespan, while increased black registration led to Democrat Hubert Humphrey winning the county in 1968. Since 1968, the majority African-American county has only backed a Republican once in 1972, when Richard Nixon won the county as he swept every county statewide in the midst of a 49-state national landslide.

United States presidential election results for Williamsburg County, South Carolina
| Year | Republican | | Democratic | | Third party(ies) | |
| Year | No. | % | No. | % | No. | % |
|---|---|---|---|---|---|---|
| 1900 | 323 | 20.46% | 1,256 | 79.54% | 0 | 0.00% |
| 1904 | 187 | 11.24% | 1,476 | 88.76% | 0 | 0.00% |
| 1908 | 180 | 10.40% | 1,550 | 89.60% | 0 | 0.00% |
| 1912 | 6 | 0.80% | 729 | 96.81% | 18 | 2.39% |
| 1916 | 57 | 4.49% | 1,213 | 95.51% | 0 | 0.00% |
| 1920 | 12 | 1.32% | 895 | 98.68% | 0 | 0.00% |
| 1924 | 4 | 0.59% | 672 | 99.41% | 0 | 0.00% |
| 1928 | 22 | 2.60% | 825 | 97.40% | 0 | 0.00% |
| 1932 | 9 | 0.72% | 1,244 | 99.28% | 0 | 0.00% |
| 1936 | 6 | 0.47% | 1,284 | 99.53% | 0 | 0.00% |
| 1940 | 34 | 3.03% | 1,089 | 96.97% | 0 | 0.00% |
| 1944 | 27 | 2.09% | 1,118 | 86.60% | 146 | 11.31% |
| 1948 | 23 | 1.16% | 126 | 6.33% | 1,840 | 92.51% |
| 1952 | 2,576 | 66.12% | 1,320 | 33.88% | 0 | 0.00% |
| 1956 | 330 | 8.80% | 683 | 18.20% | 2,739 | 73.00% |
| 1960 | 2,324 | 60.57% | 1,513 | 39.43% | 0 | 0.00% |
| 1964 | 4,810 | 68.15% | 2,248 | 31.85% | 0 | 0.00% |
| 1968 | 3,029 | 28.08% | 5,106 | 47.33% | 2,652 | 24.59% |
| 1972 | 5,729 | 52.01% | 5,213 | 47.33% | 73 | 0.66% |
| 1976 | 5,275 | 37.53% | 8,745 | 62.22% | 35 | 0.25% |
| 1980 | 5,110 | 38.29% | 8,135 | 60.96% | 99 | 0.74% |
| 1984 | 6,492 | 45.95% | 7,586 | 53.69% | 50 | 0.35% |
| 1988 | 5,914 | 44.39% | 7,343 | 55.11% | 67 | 0.50% |
| 1992 | 5,289 | 37.05% | 8,077 | 56.57% | 911 | 6.38% |
| 1996 | 3,957 | 34.84% | 6,987 | 61.52% | 413 | 3.64% |
| 2000 | 4,524 | 39.93% | 6,723 | 59.33% | 84 | 0.74% |
| 2004 | 4,795 | 34.45% | 9,044 | 64.98% | 79 | 0.57% |
| 2008 | 5,004 | 30.43% | 11,279 | 68.59% | 160 | 0.97% |
| 2012 | 4,824 | 29.59% | 11,335 | 69.52% | 145 | 0.89% |
| 2016 | 4,864 | 32.31% | 9,953 | 66.12% | 237 | 1.57% |
| 2020 | 5,532 | 34.61% | 10,289 | 64.37% | 164 | 1.03% |
| 2024 | 5,524 | 38.55% | 8,634 | 60.25% | 172 | 1.20% |

== Economy ==
In 2022, the GDP was $856 million (about $28,639 per capita), and the real GDP was $703.7 million (about $23,541 per capita) in chained 2017 dollars.

As of April 2024, some of the top employers of the county include United States Department of Justice, Food Lion, Tupperware, and Williamsburg Technical College.

Employment and Wage Statistics by Industry in Williamsburg County, South Carolina - Q3 2023
| Industry | Employment Counts | Employment Percentage (%) | Average Annual Wage ($) |
|---|---|---|---|
| Accommodation and Food Services | 279 | 4.1 | 17,264 |
| Administrative and Support and Waste Management and Remediation Services | 99 | 1.5 | 27,872 |
| Agriculture, Forestry, Fishing and Hunting | 125 | 1.8 | 42,432 |
| Construction | 372 | 5.5 | 47,008 |
| Educational Services | 662 | 9.7 | 43,524 |
| Finance and Insurance | 116 | 1.7 | 53,508 |
| Health Care and Social Assistance | 717 | 10.5 | 33,644 |
| Manufacturing | 2,056 | 30.2 | 60,944 |
| Other Services (except Public Administration) | 168 | 2.5 | 34,476 |
| Professional, Scientific, and Technical Services | 83 | 1.2 | 155,324 |
| Public Administration | 908 | 13.3 | 53,820 |
| Real Estate and Rental and Leasing | 27 | 0.4 | 37,856 |
| Retail Trade | 804 | 11.8 | 30,316 |
| Transportation and Warehousing | 178 | 2.6 | 52,780 |
| Wholesale Trade | 210 | 3.1 | 44,148 |
| Total | 6,804 | 100.0% | 47,975 |

== Communities ==
=== City ===
- Kingstree (county seat and largest community)

=== Towns ===
- Andrews (mostly in Georgetown County)
- Greeleyville
- Hemingway
- Lane
- Stuckey

=== Unincorporated communities ===
- Cades
- Gourdin
- Hebron
- Indiantown
- Nesmith
- Outland
- Rhems
- Salters
- Trio
- Piney Forest

== See also ==
- List of counties in South Carolina
- National Register of Historic Places listings in Williamsburg County, South Carolina
- Chaloklowa Chickasaw, state-recognized group that resides in the county
