= Elco, Illinois =

- Unincorporated community
- Location within Illinois Location within the United States
- Coordinates: 37°18′02″N 89°15′57″W
- Country: United States
- State: Illinois
- County: Alexander
- Elevation: 367 ft (112 m)
- Time zone: UTC-6 (Central (CST))
  - Summer (DST): UTC-5 (CDT)
- Area code: 618
- GNIS feature ID: 407839

Elco is an unincorporated community in Alexander County, Illinois, United States. Elco is located along Illinois Route 127 north of Tamms. Elco once had a post office, which closed on January 24, 1998.

== Education ==
It is in the Egyptian School District.
