= Homestead Base, Florida =

- Census-designated place
- Location in Miami-Dade County and the state of Florida

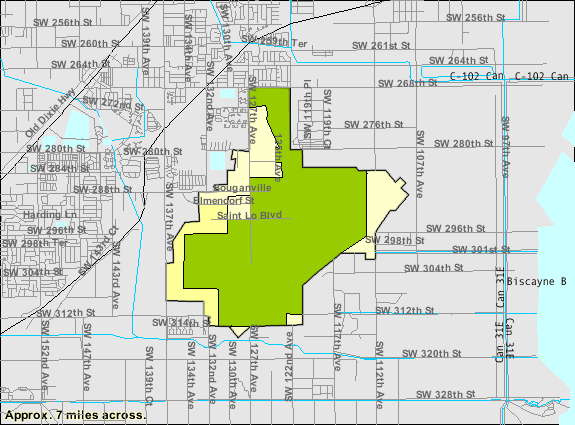
- U.S. Census Bureau map showing CDP boundaries
- Coordinates: 25°30′05″N 80°22′48″W
- Country: United States
- State: Florida
- County: Miami-Dade

Area
  - Total: 4.35 sq mi (11.26 km^{2})
  - Land: 4.24 sq mi (10.99 km^{2})
  - Water: 0.10 sq mi (0.27 km^{2})
- Elevation: 7 ft (2.1 m)

Population (2020)
  - Total: 999
  - Density: 235/sq mi (90.9/km^{2})
- Time zone: UTC-5 (Eastern (EST))
  - Summer (DST): UTC-4 (EDT)
- ZIP Code: 33039
- Area codes: 305, 786, 645
- FIPS code: 12-32325
- GNIS feature ID: 2402597

Homestead Base is a census-designated place (CDP) in Miami-Dade County, Florida, United States. The CDP comprises the extent of Homestead Air Reserve Base plus some surrounding land. It is part of the Miami metropolitan area of South Florida. The population was 999 at the 2020 census.

== Geography ==
Homestead Base is located 27 miles (43 km) southwest of downtown Miami and is bordered to the southwest by the city of Homestead.

According to the United States Census Bureau, the CDP has a total area of 4.3 square miles (11 km^{2}), of which 0.1 square miles (0.3 km^{2}), or 2.37%, are water.

== Demographics ==
Historical population
Census	Pop.	Note	%±
2000	446		—
2010	964		116.1%
2020	999		3.6%
U.S. Decennial Census

Homestead Base CDP, Florida – Racial and ethnic composition Note: the US Census treats Hispanic/Latino as an ethnic category. This table excludes Latinos from the racial categories and assigns them to a separate category. Hispanics/Latinos may be of any race.
Race / Ethnicity (NH = Non-Hispanic)	Pop 2000	Pop 2010	Pop 2020	% 2000	% 2010	% 2020
White (NH)	67	138	93	15.02%	14.32%	9.31%
Black or African American (NH)	164	492	528	36.77%	51.04%	52.85%
Native American or Alaska Native (NH)	3	3	0	0.67%	0.31%	0.00%
Asian (NH)	3	0	0	0.67%	0.00%	0.00%
Native Hawaiian or Pacific Islander alone (NH)	0	4	0	0.00%	0.41%	0.00%
Other race (NH)	0	0	4	0.00%	0.00%	0.40%
Mixed race or Multiracial (NH)	6	2	13	1.35%	0.21%	1.30%
Hispanic or Latino (any race)	203	325	361	45.52%	33.71%	36.14%
Total	446	964	999	100.00%	100.00%	100.00%

=== 2020 census ===
As of the 2020 United States census, there were 999 people, 96 households, and 96 families residing in the CDP.

=== 2010 census ===
As of the 2010 United States census, there were 964 people, 30 households, and 30 families residing in the CDP.

=== 2000 census ===
At the 2000 census there were 446 people, 13 households, and 11 families living in the CDP. The population density was 102.5 inhabitants per square mile (39.6/km^{2}). There were 13 housing units at an average density of 3.0/sq mi (1.2/km^{2}). The racial makeup of the CDP was 48.88% White (15% Non-Hispanic White), 39.46% Black or African American, 0.67% Native American, 0.90% Asian, 6.50% from other races, and 3.59% from two or more races. Hispanic or Latino of any race were 45.52%.

As of 2000, the 13 households 69.2% had children under the age of 18 living with them, 76.9% were married couples living together, 15.4% had a female householder with no husband present, and 7.7% were non-families. 7.7% of households were one person and none had someone living alone who was 65 or older. The average household size was 4.85 and the average family size was 5.17.

In 2000, the age distribution was 33.6% under the age of 18, 9.4% from 18 to 24, 34.5% from 25 to 44, 18.2% from 45 to 64, and 4.3% 65 or older. The median age was 29 years. For every 100 females, there were 101.8 males. For every 100 females age 18 and over, there were 109.9 males.

In 2000, the median household income was $43,750 and the median family income was $43,750. Males had a median income of $6,979 versus $20,662 for females. The per capita income for the CDP was $6,181. None of the families and 65.5% of the population were living below the poverty line, including no under eighteens and none of those over 64.
