= Olive Branch, Illinois =

- Census-designated place

- Location of Olive Branch in Illinois
- Coordinates: 37°10′07″N 89°21′06″W
- Country: United States
- State: Illinois
- County: Alexander
- Precincts: Olive Branch, Sandusky

Area
  - Total: 9.45 sq mi (24.48 km^{2})
  - Land: 9.45 sq mi (24.47 km^{2})
  - Water: 0.0077 sq mi (0.02 km^{2})
- Elevation: 367 ft (112 m)

Population (2020)
  - Total: 650
  - Density: 68.8/sq mi (26.57/km^{2})
- Time zone: UTC-6 (Central (CST))
  - Summer (DST): UTC-5 (CDT)
- ZIP code: 62969
- Area code: 618
- FIPS code: 17-55847
- GNIS feature ID: 2583440

Olive Branch is a census-designated place in Olive Branch and Sandusky precincts, Alexander County, Illinois, United States. It has a post office with the ZIP code 62969. Its population was 650 at the 2020 census.

Olive Branch is part of the Cape Girardeau–Jackson, MO-IL Metropolitan Statistical Area.

== Geography ==
Olive Branch is located at 37°10′07″N 89°21′06″W (37.168661, -89.351749).

According to the 2021 census gazetteer files, Olive Branch has a total area of 9.45 square miles (24.48 km^{2}), of which 9.45 square miles (24.48 km^{2}) (or 99.94%) is land and 0.01 square miles (0.03 km^{2}) (or 0.06%) is water.

== Demographics ==
Historical population
Census	Pop.	Note	%±
2010	864		—
2020	650		−24.8%
U.S. Decennial Census

As of the 2020 census there were 650 people, 217 households, and 161 families residing in the CDP. The population density was 68.76 inhabitants per square mile (26.55/km^{2}). There were 330 housing units at an average density of 34.91 per square mile (13.48/km^{2}). The racial makeup of the CDP was 91.08% White, 0.15% African American, 0.46% Native American, 0.31% from other races, and 8.00% from two or more races. Hispanic or Latino of any race were 0.92% of the population.

There were 217 households, out of which 27.6% had children under the age of 18 living with them, 58.06% were married couples living together, 10.14% had a female householder with no husband present, and 25.81% were non-families. 24.88% of all households were made up of individuals, and 20.28% had someone living alone who was 65 years of age or older. The average household size was 3.42 and the average family size was 2.81.

The CDP's age distribution consisted of 24.9% under the age of 18, 4.3% from 18 to 24, 20.5% from 25 to 44, 31.7% from 45 to 64, and 18.7% who were 65 years of age or older. The median age was 45.1 years. For every 100 females, there were 77.3 males. For every 100 females age 18 and over, there were 73.5 males.

The median income for a household in the CDP was $46,339, and the median income for a family was $47,411. Males had a median income of $31,929 versus $39,583 for females. The per capita income for the CDP was $18,653. About 19.3% of families and 23.8% of the population were below the poverty line, including 32.2% of those under age 18 and 17.5% of those age 65 or over.

== Education ==
Residents are zoned to the Egyptian School District.
