= Tamms, Illinois =

- Village
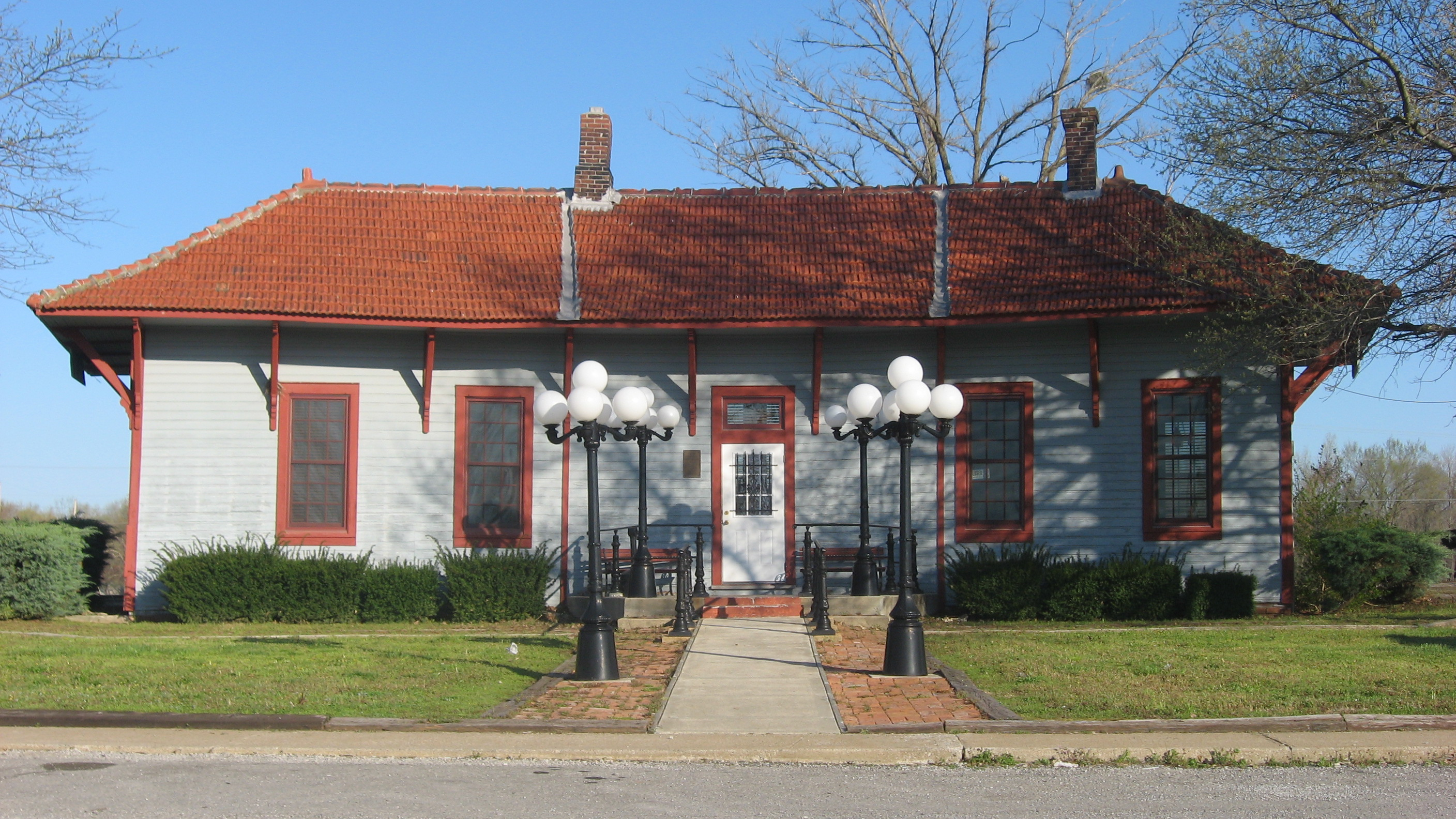
- Tamms Depot, now the village hall

- Location of Tamms in Illinois

- Location of Illinois in the United States
- Coordinates: 37°14′25″N 89°15′53″W
- Country: United States
- State: Illinois
- County: Alexander
- Precinct: Tamms

Area
  - Total: 2.33 sq mi (6.04 km^{2})
  - Land: 2.33 sq mi (6.04 km^{2})
  - Water: 0 sq mi (0.00 km^{2}) 0%
- Elevation: 341 ft (104 m)

Population (2020)
  - Total: 430
  - Estimate (2024): 373 ▼
  - Density: 184.4/sq mi (71.21/km^{2})
- Time zone: UTC-6 (CST)
  - Summer (DST): UTC-5 (CDT)
- ZIP Code(s): 62988
- Area code: 618
- FIPS code: 17-74457
- GNIS feature ID: 2399951
- Wikimedia Commons: Tamms, Illinois

Tamms is a village in Tamms Precinct, Alexander County, Illinois, United States. The population was 430 at the 2020 census, down from 632 at the 2010 census. It is part of the Cape Girardeau–Jackson, MO-IL Metropolitan Statistical Area.

== History ==
Tamms was established under the name of Idlewild in 1883.

The railroad service ended in the 1970s and therefore the economy declined.

Tamms is the location of the Tamms Correctional Center, a super-maximum correctional facility that was operated by the Illinois Department of Corrections and housed the State of Illinois execution chamber. Illinois abolished the death penalty in 2011. This prison was closed in 2013.

== Geography ==
Tamms is located at 37°14′25″N 89°15′53″W (37.240207, -89.264822).

According to the 2021 census gazetteer files, Tamms has a total area of 2.33 square miles (6.03 km^{2}), all land.

== Demographics ==
Historical population
Census	Pop.	Note	%±
1910	400		—
1920	822		105.5%
1930	717		−12.8%
1940	777		8.4%
1950	665		−14.4%
1960	548		−17.6%
1970	645		17.7%
1980	826		28.1%
1990	748		−9.4%
2000	724		−3.2%
2010	632		−12.7%
2020	430		−32.0%
U.S. Decennial Census

=== 2020 census ===
Note: the US Census treats Hispanic/Latino as an ethnic category. This table excludes Latinos from the racial categories and assigns them to a separate category. Hispanics/Latinos can be of any race.

As of the 2020 census there were 430 people, 220 households, and 148 families residing in the village. The population density was 184.39 inhabitants per square mile (71.19/km^{2}). There were 238 housing units at an average density of 102.06 per square mile (39.41/km^{2}). The racial makeup of the village was 67.91% White, 28.60% African American, 0.93% Native American, and 2.56% from two or more races. Hispanic or Latino of any race were 1.63% of the population.

There were 220 households, out of which 31.4% had children under the age of 18 living with them, 51.36% were married couples living together, 10.45% had a female householder with no husband present, and 32.73% were non-families. 28.18% of all households were made up of individuals, and 8.18% had someone living alone who was 65 years of age or older. The average household size was 3.63 and the average family size was 2.91.

The village's age distribution consisted of 25.2% under the age of 18, 4.0% from 18 to 24, 20.8% from 25 to 44, 34.1% from 45 to 64, and 15.8% who were 65 years of age or older. The median age was 45.0 years. For every 100 females, there were 166.9 males. For every 100 females age 18 and over, there were 151.2 males.

The median income for a household in the village was $45,227, and the median income for a family was $47,045. Males had a median income of $38,295 versus $39,605 for females. The per capita income for the village was $18,068. About 8.8% of families and 17.5% of the population were below the poverty line, including 11.3% of those under age 18 and 25.2% of those age 65 or over.

Tamms racial composition (NH = Non-Hispanic)
Race	Number	Percentage
White (NH)	286	66.51%
Black or African American (NH)	123	28.6%
Native American or Alaska Native (NH)	4	0.93%
Mixed/Multi-Racial (NH)	10	2.33%
Hispanic or Latino	7	1.63%
Total	430	

== Government and infrastructure ==
Tamms was the location of the former Tamms Correctional Center, a super-maximum correctional facility operated by the Illinois Department of Corrections which was closed in January 2013. The State of Illinois execution chamber was at Tamms. Prior to the January 11, 2003 commutation of death row sentences, male death row inmates were housed in Tamms, Menard, and Pontiac correctional centers. After that date, only Pontiac continued to host the male death row. The death penalty was abolished in Illinois in March 2011.

== Education ==
The school district is the Egyptian School District.

In previous eras Tamms Community High School was the public high school.
