= Lane, South Carolina =

- Town
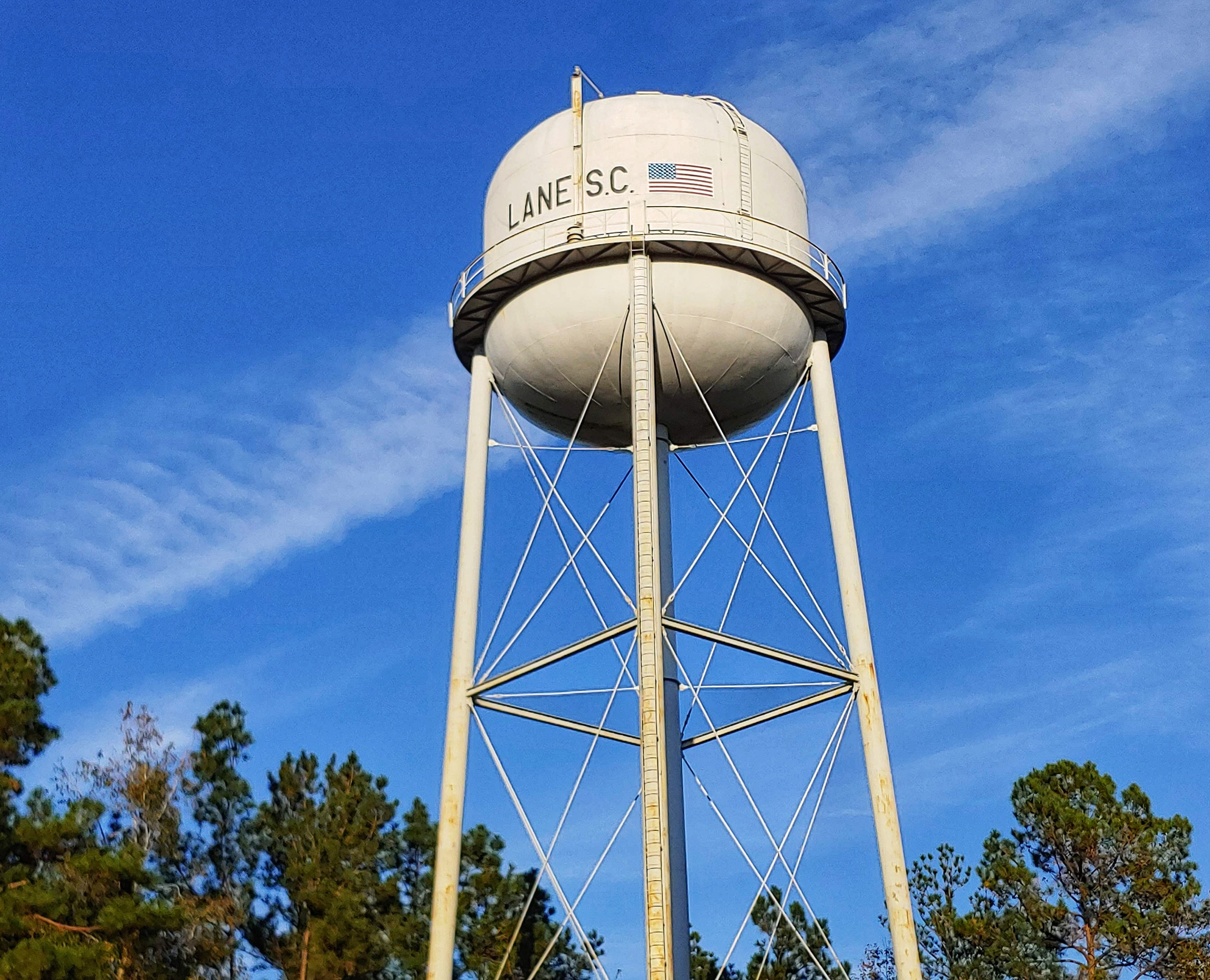
- Water tower in Lane, SC

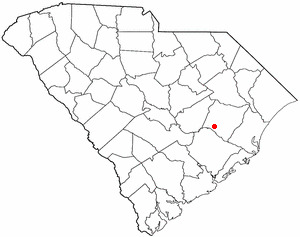
- Location of Lane, South Carolina
- Coordinates: 33°31′31″N 79°52′26″W
- Country: United States
- State: South Carolina
- County: Williamsburg

Government
  - Type: Town Council
  - Mayor: Charlie Fulton

Area
  - Total: 3.95 sq mi (10.23 km^{2})
  - Land: 3.95 sq mi (10.23 km^{2})
  - Water: 0 sq mi (0.00 km^{2})
- Elevation: 66 ft (20 m)

Population (2020)
  - Total: 472
  - Density: 119.5/sq mi (46.14/km^{2})
- Time zone: UTC-5 (Eastern (EST))
  - Summer (DST): UTC-4 (EDT)
- ZIP code: 29564
- Area codes: 843, 854
- FIPS code: 45-40210
- GNIS feature ID: 2405984
- Website: https://www.mytownoflane.org/

Lane is a town in Williamsburg County, South Carolina, United States. The population was 480 at the 2020 census.

Lane is a predominantly black town.

== Geography ==
According to the United States Census Bureau, the town has a total area of 4.0 square miles (10 km^{2}), all of it land.

Lane is located about an hour's drive from Charleston and the Atlantic Ocean.

== Demographics ==
Historical population
Census	Pop.	Note	%±
1920	308		—
1930	433		40.6%
1940	297		−31.4%
1950	580		95.3%
1960	497		−14.3%
1970	517		4.0%
1980	554		7.2%
1990	523		−5.6%
2000	585		11.9%
2010	508		−13.2%
2020	472		−7.1%
U.S. Decennial Census; 2010 2020

=== 2020 census ===
Lane town, South Carolina – Racial and ethnic composition Note: the US Census treats Hispanic/Latino as an ethnic category. This table excludes Latinos from the racial categories and assigns them to a separate category. Hispanics/Latinos may be of any race.
Race / Ethnicity (NH = Non-Hispanic)	Pop 2000	Pop 2010	Pop 2020	% 2000	% 2010	% 2020
White alone (NH)	54	44	39	8.23%	8.66%	8.26%
Black or African American alone (NH)	525	460	413	89.74%	90.55%	87.50%
Native American or Alaska Native alone (NH)	0	0	0	0.00%	0.00%	0.00%
Asian alone (NH)	0	0	0	0.00%	0.00%	0.00%
Native Hawaiian or Pacific Islander alone (NH)	0	0	0	0.00%	0.00%	0.00%
Other race alone (NH)	0	0	4	0.00%	0.00%	0.85%
Mixed race or Multiracial (NH)	2	3	8	0.34%	0.59%	1.69%
Hispanic or Latino (any race)	4	1	8	0.68%	0.20%	1.69%
Total	585	508	472	100.00%	100.00%	100.00%

=== 2000 census ===
As of the census of 2000, there were 585 people, 223 households, and 148 families residing in the town. The population density was 147.4 inhabitants per square mile (56.9/km^{2}). There were 256 housing units at an average density of 64.5 per square mile (24.9/km^{2}). The racial makeup of the town was 9.23% White, 90.43% African American, and 0.34% from two or more races. Hispanic or Latino of any race were 0.68% of the population.

There were 223 households, out of which 30.0% had children under the age of 18 living with them, 33.6% were married couples living together, 28.3% had a female householder with no husband present, and 33.6% were non-families. 30.9% of all households were made up of individuals, and 13.9% had someone living alone who was 65 years of age or older. The average household size was 2.62 and the average family size was 3.35.

In the town, the population was spread out, with 29.1% under the age of 18, 8.5% from 18 to 24, 23.8% from 25 to 44, 23.1% from 45 to 64, and 15.6% who were 65 years of age or older. The median age was 35 years. For every 100 females, there were 79.4 males. For every 100 females age 18 and over, there were 73.6 males.

The median income for a household in the town was $19,659, and the median income for a family was $28,472. Males had a median income of $21,635 versus $15,000 for females. The per capita income for the town was $9,963. About 30.9% of families and 33.2% of the population were below the poverty line, including 42.8% of those under age 18 and 26.4% of those age 65 or over.

== History and facts ==
Lane, a farming community between the Santee and Black River Basins, was established in 1856.

The town is bisected by the main north–south CSX Transportation line. Located in a rural setting, Lane is situated a short distance southeast of the intersection of US Highways 52 and 521. The water, provided by a modern municipal water system from ground water sources, was named the best drinking water by the SC Rural Water Association in 1990.

== Notable people ==
- James Mitchum, actor Robert Mitchum’s father
- Herb Murrell, member of Philadelphia soul group The Stylistics
