= National Register of Historic Places listings in Alexander County, Illinois =

Location of Alexander County in Illinois

This is a list of the National Register of Historic Places listings in Alexander County, Illinois.

This is intended to be a complete list of the properties and districts on the National Register of Historic Places in Alexander County, Illinois, United States. Latitude and longitude coordinates are provided for many National Register properties and districts; these locations may be seen together in a map.

There are 8 properties and districts listed on the National Register in the county.

This National Park Service list is complete through NPS recent listings posted April 4, 2025.

== Current listings ==
	Name on the Register	Image	Date listed	Location	City or town	Description
1	Cairo Historic District	Cairo Historic District	January 26, 1979 (#79000815)	Roughly bounded by Park, 33rd, Sycamore, 21st, Cedar, and 4th Sts., and the Ohio River; 37°00′20″N 89°10′27″W	Cairo	
2	Chicago and Eastern Illinois Railroad Depot	Chicago and Eastern Illinois Railroad Depot	November 6, 1986 (#86003168)	Front St. 37°14′08″N 89°16′11″W	Tamms	
3	Dogtooth Bend Mounds and Village Site	Dogtooth Bend Mounds and Village Site	May 23, 1978 (#78001111)	Western end of Lake Milligan; 37°03′50″N 89°20′05″W	Willard	
4	Magnolia Manor	Magnolia Manor	December 17, 1969 (#69000053)	2700 Washington Ave. 37°00′34″N 89°10′57″W	Cairo	
5	Thomas J. and Caroline McClure House	Thomas J. and Caroline McClure House	November 15, 1996 (#96001341)	Main St., 0.5 miles east of Illinois Route 3; 37°19′04″N 89°25′38″W	McClure	
6	Old Customhouse	Old Customhouse	July 24, 1973 (#73000689)	Washington and 15th St. 37°00′10″N 89°10′19″W	Cairo	
7	Thebes Courthouse	Thebes Courthouse	December 26, 1972 (#72000447)	Off Illinois Route 3; 37°13′10″N 89°27′36″W	Thebes	
8	Ward Chapel AME Church	Ward Chapel AME Church	August 13, 2024 (#100010699)	420 17th Street; 37°00′10″N 89°10′28″W	Cairo	

== See also ==
- List of National Historic Landmarks in Illinois
- National Register of Historic Places listings in Illinois
