= Alexander County Courthouse (Illinois) =

Local government building in the United States

Coordinates: 37°0′20″N 89°10′34″W

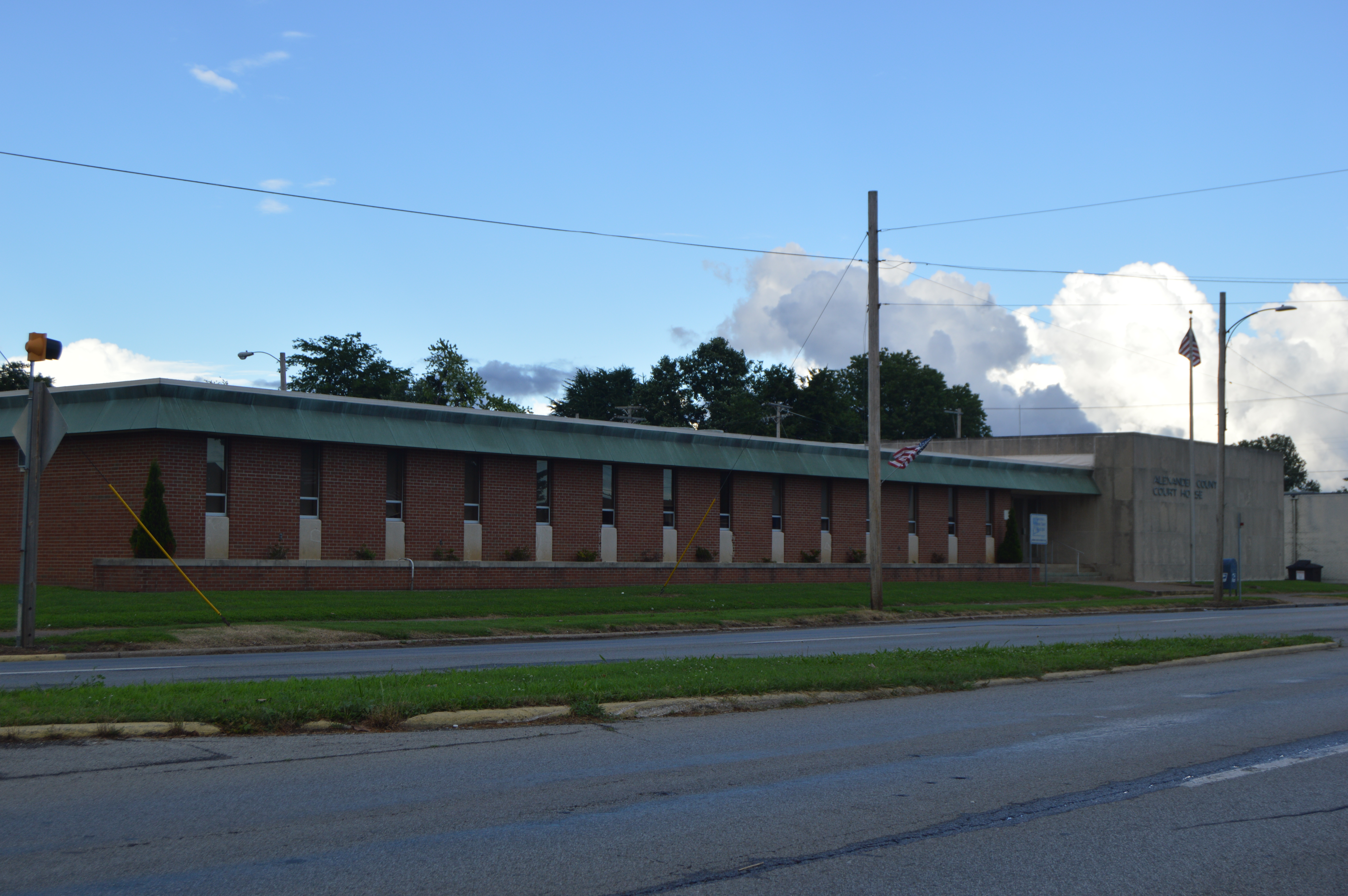
Facade, seen from north

The Alexander County Courthouse is a government building in central Cairo, the county seat of Alexander County, Illinois, United States. Built in the 1960s, it is the latest in a series of courthouses erected in four towns across Alexander County.

== Past county seats ==
Alexander County was created out of Union County in March 1819, and it was named for one William M. Alexander, an early settler who served in the House of Representatives from 1820 to 1824 and was chosen Speaker in 1822. The law creating the county ordered that the courts meet at Alexander's home in the community of America until a county seat should be chosen, and America was designated the seat in April 1819. Alexander oversaw the construction of a brick courthouse. However, America's prosperity was short-lived: an epidemic prompted most of the residents to flee, and while its location along the Ohio River was convenient for flatboats, nearby sandbars prevented newly developed steamboats from landing, and by 1821 the town was languishing. A new settlement, Unity, was founded midway between the Ohio and Mississippi Rivers in 1833, and legislation was quickly passed to enable the seat to move there. County officials ordered the construction of a log courthouse in 1835, but this building burned in 1842, the victim of a fire set by a pair of escaping prisoners. Because Unity sat in the middle of Alexander County, the creation of Pulaski County from the county's eastern half left it in an inconvenient location, and in 1843 the seat was removed to Thebes, a Mississippi River town. Here, a new courthouse was built in 1848 for $4,400.

== Cairo as seat ==
While towns farther north rotated the honor of county seat, the site of Fort Defiance at the confluence of the Ohio and Mississippi had been growing into a significant town. The General Assembly chartered a company to found a town there in 1837 under the name of "Cairo, Illinois", and by 1841 Cairo had two thousand residents. Nearly all the residents abandoned the town following an 1842 flood, but a newly constructed levee protected the site during the Great Flood of 1844, and Cairo began to prosper in the early 1850s. By 1860, it was rich enough to mount a successful challenge to Thebes for the status of county seat, although a new courthouse was not built until 1865, the Civil War having dominated life in Cairo during the intervening years. The new building was a two-story structure in the Neoclassical style with pedimented gables and colonnade over the main entrance. Although large, this building deteriorated comparatively rapidly; it was deemed "horribly kept" by an 1883 county history, and some county offices were located in the Old Customhouse several blocks away. The old building nevertheless remained in use until 1963, when it was destroyed and replaced by the present building.

== Current courthouse ==
Located on Washington Avenue, the current courthouse is a modernist building, long and just one story tall. Much of the facade is brick with numerous windows, although the right end of the facade (as seen from the street) is concrete with no doors or windows.
