= McClure =

McClure may refer to:

== Geography ==
- McClure, Illinois, USA
- McClure, Ohio, USA
- McClure, Pennsylvania, USA
- McClure, Virginia, USA
- Maclure Glacier, a glacier in Yosemite National Park
- McClure Pass, a mountain pass in Colorado, USA
- McClure Peak, a mountain in New Zealand
- M'Clure Strait, a strait on the edge of the Canadian Northwest Territories
- McClure Township, Holt County, Nebraska, USA
- Lake McClure, a reservoir in central California, USA
- Mount Maclure, a mountain in Yosemite National Park
- Shively–McClure Historic District in Astoria, Oregon, USA

== People ==
- McClure (surname)
- McClure, the standard author abbreviation for American botanist Floyd Alonzo McClure (1897–1970)

== Other ==
- McClure (crater), an impact crater on the Moon
- McClure's Magazine, a popular United States illustrated monthly magazine at the turn of the 20th century

== See also ==
- McClure House (disambiguation)
- McCluer (disambiguation)
- McLure
