= Thebes Precinct, Illinois =

Thebes Precinct
- Precinct
- Location of Thebes Precinct in Alexander County
- Coordinates: 37°12′40″N 89°23′58″W
- Country: United States
- State: Illinois
- County: Alexander

Area
  - Total: 30.32 sq mi (78.5 km^{2})
  - Land: 28.72 sq mi (74.4 km^{2})
  - Water: 1.59 sq mi (4.1 km^{2})
- Elevation: 400 ft (120 m)

Population (2020)
  - Total: 580
  - Density: 20/sq mi (7.8/km^{2})
- GNIS feature ID: 1928659
- FIPS code: 17-003-93420

Thebes Precinct is located in Alexander County, Illinois, United States. As of the 2020 census, its population was 580.

== Geography ==
According to the 2021 census gazetteer files, Thebes Precinct has a total area of 30.32 square miles (78.53 km^{2}), of which 28.72 square miles (74.38 km^{2}) (or 94.75%) is land and 1.59 square miles (4.12 km^{2}) (or 5.25%) is water.

=== Villages ===
- Thebes

=== Unincorporated communities ===
- Fayville

== Demographics ==
As of the 2020 census there were 580 people, 283 households, and 229 families residing in the precinct. The population density was 19.13 inhabitants per square mile (7.39/km^{2}). There were 312 housing units at an average density of 10.29 per square mile (3.97/km^{2}). The racial makeup of the precinct was 90.52% White, 4.31% African American, 0.52% Native American, 0.00% Asian, 0.00% Pacific Islander, 0.52% from other races, and 4.14% from two or more races. Hispanic or Latino of any race were 3.10% of the population.

There were 283 households, out of which 36.40% had children under the age of 18 living with them, 68.90% were married couples living together, 10.25% had a female householder with no spouse present, and 19.08% were non-families. 16.30% of all households were made up of individuals, and 12.00% had someone living alone who was 65 years of age or older. The average household size was 3.57 and the average family size was 4.13.

The precinct's age distribution consisted of 41.2% under the age of 18, 5.8% from 18 to 24, 16.8% from 25 to 44, 22.3% from 45 to 64, and 13.8% who were 65 years of age or older. The median age was 27.0 years. For every 100 females, there were 77.4 males. For every 100 females age 18 and over, there were 85.0 males.

The median income for a household in the precinct was $51,172, and the median income for a family was $62,614. Males had a median income of $46,250 versus $27,222 for females. The per capita income for the precinct was $23,153. About 20.1% of families and 20.9% of the population were below the poverty line, including 29.3% of those under age 18 and 6.4% of those age 65 or over.
