= Dogtooth Island, Illinois =

Island in Alexander County, Illinois, United States

Coordinates: 37.01949°N 89.28230°W

Dogtooth Island is a landlocked fluvial island adjacent to the Mississippi River. Approximately 3 miles (4.9 km) long, it is part of Alexander County in the U.S. state of Illinois. The nearest community is Willard, Illinois. The patch of wetland, still called by courtesy an "island", is on the tip of Dogtooth Bend, a fluvial oxbow-peninsula formed by a meander of the Mississippi Rivber. Much of the Island has been placed in conservation easement for purposes of wetland reserve and floodplain restoration.

A June 2025 report indicates that an even larger section of Dogtooth Bend and Island may soon be reclaimed by the Mississippi River. The riverbend cradles what was 15,000 acres of tillable bottomland, but the levee that protects the bend has partly eroded. In the aftermath of a 2019 flood, 4,000 acres went out of production and into floodplain restoration. The Dogtooth Island wetland now managed by the Nature Conservancy is part of this transition. Now, hydrologists say the rest of Dogtooth Bend may be lost to river avulsion.
