= McClure Precinct, Illinois =

McClure Precinct
- Precinct
- Location of McClure Precinct in Alexander County
- Coordinates: 37.298520°N 89.421926°W
- Country: United States
- State: Illinois
- County: Alexander

Area
  - Total: 46.58 sq mi (120.6 km^{2})
  - Land: 44.59 sq mi (115.5 km^{2})
  - Water: 1.98 sq mi (5.1 km^{2})
- Elevation: 331 ft (101 m)

Population (2020)
  - Total: 736
  - Density: 16.5/sq mi (6.37/km^{2})
- GNIS feature ID: 1928563
- FIPS code: 17-003-91980

McClure Precinct is located in Alexander County, Illinois, United States. As of the 2020 census, its population was 736.

== Geography ==
According to the 2021 census gazetteer files, McClure Precinct has a total area of 46.58 square miles (120.64 km^{2}), of which 44.59 square miles (115.49 km^{2}) (or 95.74%) is land and 1.98 square miles (5.13 km^{2}) (or 4.26%) is water.

=== Villages ===
- East Cape Girardeau
- McClure

=== Unincorporated communities ===
- Gale

== Demographics ==
As of the 2020 census there were 736 people, 314 households, and 170 families residing in the precinct. The population density was 15.80 inhabitants per square mile (6.10/km^{2}). There were 416 housing units at an average density of 8.93 per square mile (3.45/km^{2}). The racial makeup of the precinct was 89.40% White, 3.94% African American, 0.00% Native American, 0.27% Asian, 0.00% Pacific Islander, 0.54% from other races, and 5.84% from two or more races. Hispanic or Latino of any race were 1.63% of the population.

There were 314 households, out of which 16.60% had children under the age of 18 living with them, 41.72% were married couples living together, 9.24% had a female householder with no spouse present, and 45.86% were non-families. 39.50% of all households were made up of individuals, and 20.40% had someone living alone who was 65 years of age or older. The average household size was 2.32 and the average family size was 2.89.

The precinct's age distribution consisted of 18.6% under the age of 18, 2.2% from 18 to 24, 23.2% from 25 to 44, 32.1% from 45 to 64, and 24.0% who were 65 years of age or older. The median age was 50.4 years. For every 100 females, there were 112.2 males. For every 100 females age 18 and over, there were 98.7 males.

The median income for a household in the precinct was $40,769, and the median income for a family was $49,722. Males had a median income of $33,214 versus $21,806 for females. The per capita income for the precinct was $21,230. About 12.9% of families and 23.4% of the population were below the poverty line, including 35.8% of those under age 18 and 11.4% of those age 65 or over.
