= East Cape (disambiguation) =

East Cape is a headland at the north-eastern point of the Gisborne District of New Zealand.

East Cape may also refer to:

- Gisborne District, or the large part of it north of the Poverty Bay area
- East Cape (New Zealand electorate), 1978–1993
- East Cape (Cabo del Este), Baja California, Mexico
- East Cape, a volcano on Buldir Island, Alaska, US
- East Cape Girardeau, Illinois, US
- Cape Dezhnev, Russia, formerly known as East Cape
- Eastern Cape Province in South Africa
