= Dogtooth Bend Mounds and Village Site =

Archaeological site in Illinois, United States

- U.S. National Register of Historic Places
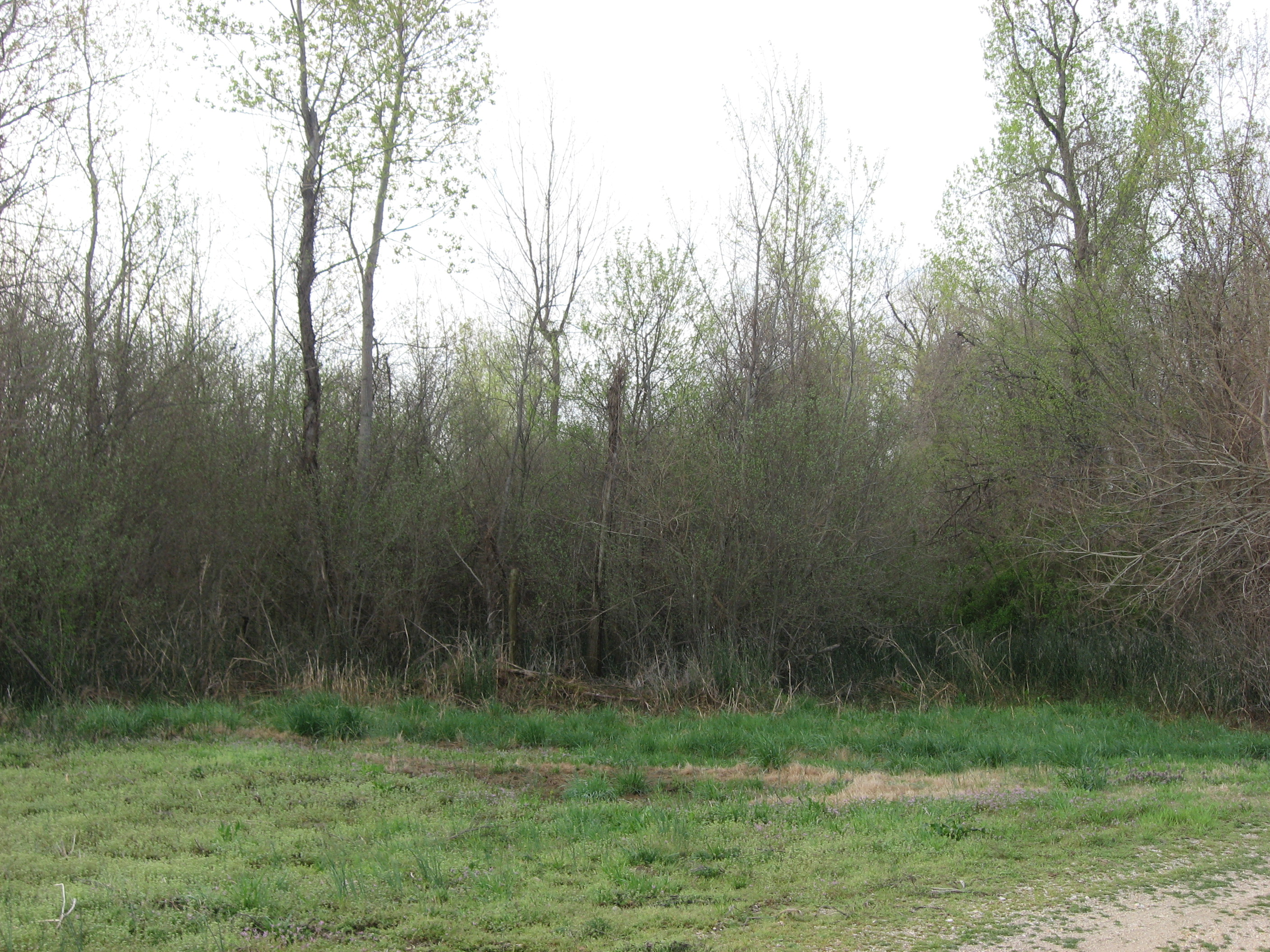

- Location within Illinois Location within the United States
- Nearest city: Willard, Illinois
- Coordinates: 37°3′50″N 89°20′5″W
- Area: 196 acres (79 ha)
- NRHP reference No.: 78001111
- Added to NRHP: May 23, 1978

Dogtooth Bend Mounds and Village Site is an archaeological site located on the western shore of Lake Milligan in Alexander County, Illinois. The site includes two mounds and a village site stretching northwest of the mounds. The village was inhabited by Middle Mississippian peoples from roughly 900-1600 A.D. It likely served as a trade hub and a social center for residents of the surrounding farmland. Formal archaeological investigation of the site was initiated in 1950 by Irvin Peithman of Southern Illinois University.

The site was added to the National Register of Historic Places on May 23, 1978.

== See also ==
- List of archaeological sites on the National Register of Historic Places in Illinois
