= Cape Girardeau Bridge =

Bridge in Missouri and Illinois, US

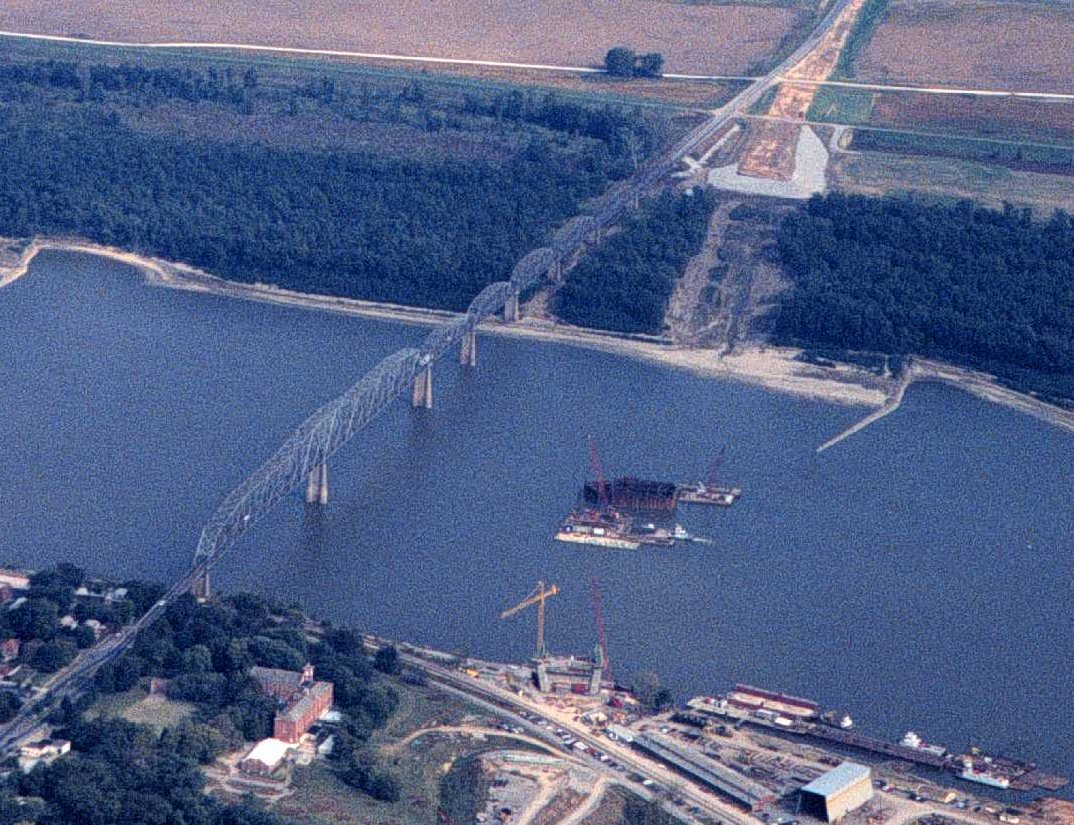
- Coordinates: 37°17′43″N 89°30′57″W
- Carries: 2 lanes of Route 34/ IL 146
- Crosses: Mississippi River
- Locale: Cape Girardeau, Missouri and East Cape Girardeau, Illinois
- Other name: Old Cape Girardeau Bridge

Characteristics
- Design: Continuous through truss bridge
- Total length: 4,744.3 ft (1,446.1 m)
- Width: 20 ft (6.1 m)
- Longest span: 671 ft (205 m)

History
- Opened: September 3, 1928
- Closed: December 13, 2003

Location
- Interactive map of Cape Girardeau Bridge

The Cape Girardeau Bridge was a continuous through truss bridge connecting Missouri's Route 34 with Illinois Route 146 across the Mississippi River between Cape Girardeau, Missouri, and East Cape Girardeau, Illinois. It was replaced in 2003 with the Bill Emerson Memorial Bridge.

== History ==
On May 4, 1926, President Calvin Coolidge signed a bill approving construction of a Mississippi River bridge at Cape Girardeau. A drive to sell $300,000 in bridge stock began on September 6, 1926, and the drive was completed only four days later after 1,124 people purchased $403,600 worth of the stock. On December 4, 1926, the construction contract was awarded to the American Bridge Company of New York for the superstructure and the U.G.I. Company of Philadelphia for the substructure. The bids totaled about $1.2 million. Construction began in February 1927 and it was completed in September 1928. On September 3, 1928, the bridge was dedicated in a ceremony that was attended by nearly 15,000 people. It was originally a toll bridge.

In June 1987, the Missouri Highway and Transportation Department approved design location of a new four-lane Mississippi River bridge to replace the deteriorating Cape Girardeau Bridge. In the final years of the bridge's existence, the safety of the structure was often questioned. Motorists both saw and felt the road deck shifting as they drove across the bridge. Portions of its road deck were worn down to the steel grid, to the point that the water below could be seen through small holes in the asphalt. Large chunks of rust were falling onto maintenance workers' heads, and photos circulated in the media showing the deteriorating roadway and a broken steel beam held up by a chain. In addition, inspections in 2002 resulted in the installation of clip angles for extra reinforcement. As the bridge's rapid deterioration gained greater public attention in 2002 and 2003, traffic over it significantly decreased, resulting in a sharp drop in customers for businesses across the river in East Cape Girardeau.

The Cape Girardeau Bridge was closed permanently on December 13, 2003, when the new four-lane Bill Emerson Memorial Bridge opened just downstream. Demolition work on the old bridge began in June 2004. The approach spans were blasted in August 2004, and the main span was blasted on September 9, 2004. The September 9 blast was intended to bring down only the longest of the main spans; however, because of the continuous through truss design, the blast also caused the unintended collapse of the other two main spans (which were to be blasted separately).

== Design ==
The Cape Girardeau Bridge was a continuous through truss bridge. The bridge had eight spans, and it weighed 43,000 tons. The bridge was very narrow, with a road deck measuring only 20 feet (6.1 m) wide. At the time of the bridge's proposal, the idea of a continuous through truss was still somewhat new and controversial among the engineering community. After Gustav Lindenthal constructed a railroad bridge using the continuous through truss design at Sciotoville, Ohio, in 1916, other engineers began to warm up to the concept. The Cape Girardeau Bridge was the first Missouri bridge to use the continuous through truss. The newly popular design of the Cape Girardeau Bridge immediately spread to other new bridges constructed in Missouri, including the Quincy Memorial Bridge in 1928 and the Chain of Rocks Bridge in 1929.

== See also ==
- List of bridges documented by the Historic American Engineering Record in Illinois
- List of bridges documented by the Historic American Engineering Record in Missouri
- List of crossings of the Upper Mississippi River
