= Future City, Illinois =

- Unincorporated community
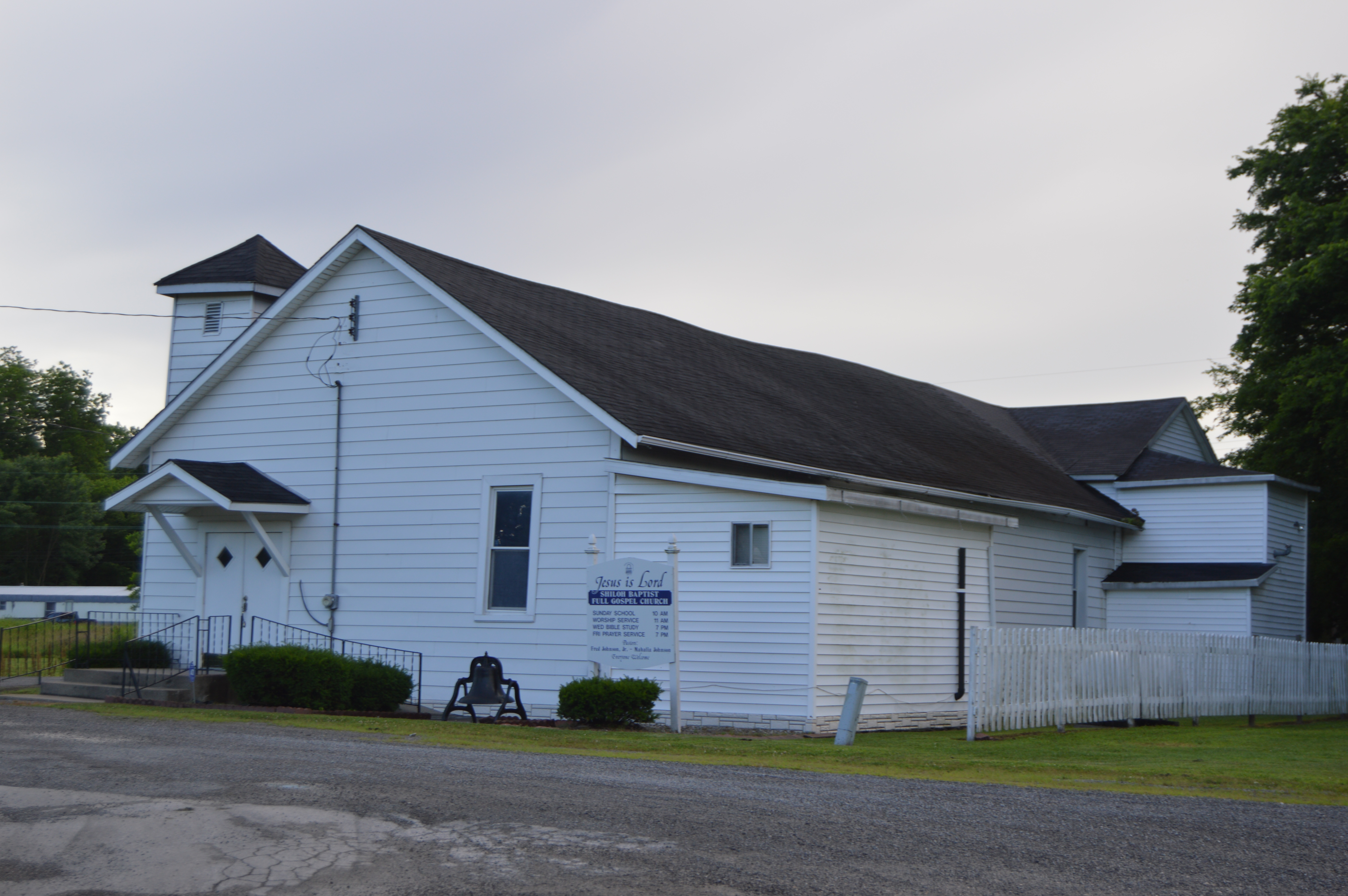
- Shiloh Baptist Full Gospel Church

- Location within Illinois Location within the United States
- Coordinates: 37°01′44″N 89°11′17″W
- Country: United States
- State: Illinois
- County: Alexander
- Precinct: Cache
- Elevation: 312 ft (95 m)
- Time zone: UTC-6 (Central (CST))
  - Summer (DST): UTC-5 (CDT)
- ZIP code: 62914
- Area codes: 618/730
- GNIS feature ID: 424909

Future City is an unincorporated community in Cache Precinct, Alexander County, Illinois, United States. Future City is located along U.S. Route 51 north of Cairo, and south of Urbandale.

The town was founded as a suburb of Cairo in the early 1900s and was populated almost entirely by African Americans. Much of the town was damaged during a flood in 1912 but was quickly rebuilt. However, the town was once again devastated in 1913 during the Great Flood of 1913 with every building in town being damaged or moved during the flood. Only a few residents remain in Future City today.

== Education ==
It is in the Cairo School District. Future City used to have a school named Bruce School. It reportedly closed in the late 1960's.
