= Urbandale (disambiguation) =

Urbandale may refer to:

- Urbandale, Iowa, a city with a population of 39,463 at the 2010 U.S. Census
- Urbandale, Illinois, an unincorporated community
- Urbandale, Ottawa, a neighbourhood in Ottawa
