= Klondike, Illinois =

- Unincorporated community
- Location within Illinois Location within the United States
- Coordinates: 37°03′46″N 89°13′54″W
- Country: United States
- State: Illinois
- County: Alexander
- Elevation: 322 ft (98 m)
- Time zone: UTC-6 (Central (CST))
  - Summer (DST): UTC-5 (CDT)
- Area code: 618
- GNIS feature ID: 425081

Klondike is an unincorporated community in Alexander County, Illinois, United States. Klondike is located along Illinois Route 3 northwest of Cairo.

An EF2 tornado struck Klondike on April 23, 2011.

== Education ==
It is in the Cairo School District.
