= Gale, Illinois =

- Unincorporated community
- Location within Illinois Location within the United States
- Coordinates: 37°14′56″N 89°26′51″W
- Country: United States
- State: Illinois
- County: Alexander
- Elevation: 338 ft (103 m)
- Time zone: UTC-6 (Central (CST))
  - Summer (DST): UTC-5 (CDT)
- Area code: 618
- GNIS feature ID: 408843

Gale is an unincorporated community in Alexander County, Illinois, United States. Gale is located along the Mississippi River north of Thebes. The community is served by Illinois Route 3.
