= William Melville Alexander (Illinois politician) =

American physician and politician

William Melville Alexander was an American politician, physician, and land speculator active in Illinois.

In 1817, Alexander laid out a settlement on behalf of a Cincinnati-based land company. The settlement, America, Illinois, was envisioned as a major city and possibly even an inland capital for the United States. The ambitious goals of the project were never realized. He was first elected to the Illinois House of Representatives in 1820 and reelected in 1822. In his second term, he was elected Speaker of the Illinois House of Representatives by his colleagues.

In the 1824 United States presidential election, Alexander was an elector pledged to William H. Crawford. That same year, he ran for an appointment from the Illinois General Assembly to the United States Senate to succeed Ninian Edwards. Alexander lost to John McLean.

After a series of failed land ventures in Illinois, he moved to the Southern United States where he died. He is the namesake of Alexander County, Illinois.
