= Cache, Illinois =

Cache, Illinois North Cairo
- Unincorporated community
- Location within Illinois Location within the United States
- Coordinates: 37°06′00″N 89°15′41″W
- Country: United States
- State: Illinois
- County: Alexander
- Precinct: Cache
- Platted: January 20, 1904
- Elevation: 335 ft (102 m)
- Time zone: UTC-6 (Central (CST))
  - Summer (DST): UTC-5 (CDT)
- ZIP code: 62962
- Area code: 618
- GNIS feature ID: 424696

Cache is an unincorporated community in Cache Precinct, Alexander County, Illinois, United States. Cache, sometimes called North Cairo, was laid out on January 20, 1904, for B.M. Cyril, President of City Manufacturing Company. Cache is located near the Mississippi River, west of Mounds. It is served by Illinois Route 3. The Beech Ridge Post Office was moved to Bourland's store, operated by O.R. Bourland, and renamed Cache. It opened on October 15, 1914. Cache once had a post office, which closed on October 5, 2002.

== Education ==
It is in the Cairo School District.
