= Fayville, Illinois =

- Unincorporated community
- Location within Illinois Location within the United States
- Coordinates: 37°09′53″N 89°25′36″W
- Country: United States
- State: Illinois
- County: Alexander
- Elevation: 344 ft (105 m)
- Time zone: UTC-6 (Central (CST))
  - Summer (DST): UTC-5 (CDT)
- Area code: 618
- GNIS feature ID: 422694

Fayville (/feɪjvɪl/, FAY-vil) is an unincorporated community in Alexander County, Illinois, United States. Fayville is located along the Mississippi River south of Thebes.
