= Ullin station =

- Illinois Central Railroad Depot
- U.S. National Register of Historic Places
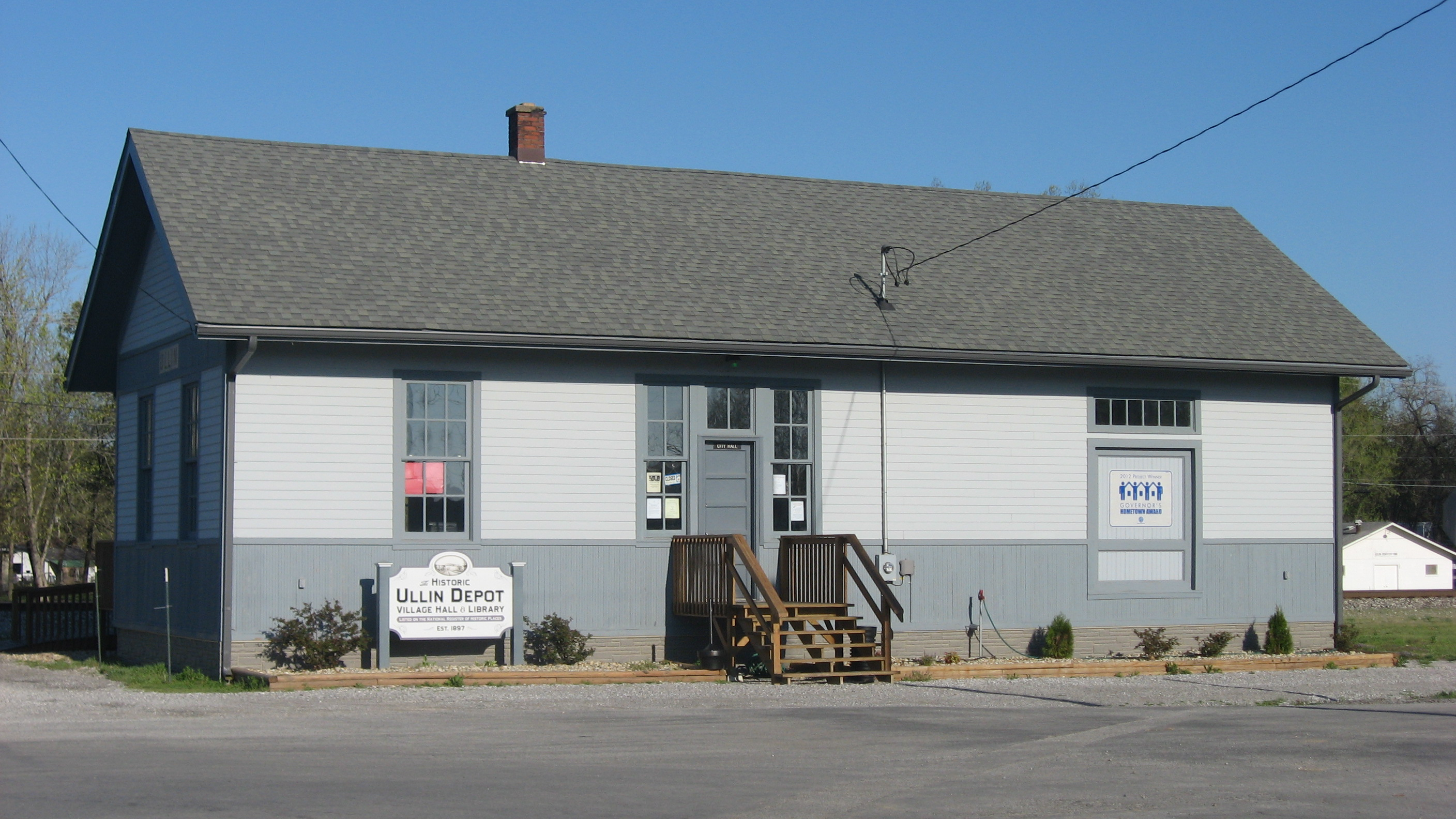
- Front and southern end

- Location within Illinois Location within the United States
- Location: Jct. of Central Ave. and Ullin Ave., Ullin, Illinois
- Coordinates: 37°16′40″N 89°10′54″W
- Area: less than one acre
- NRHP reference No.: 99000978
- Added to NRHP: August 18, 1999

Ullin station is a former Illinois Central Railroad station located at the intersection of Central Ave. and Ullin Ave. in Ullin, Illinois. Illinois Central service to Ullin began in 1854, and two stations were constructed in 1854 and 1863, both of which were later demolished. The existing station was built in 1897. The station provided freight and passenger rail service to Ullin; the freight trains exported limestone and lumber from the village. In addition, the depot served as Ullin's telegraph station, as the area's telegraph lines followed the Illinois Central tracks. Passenger service to the station ended in 1967, and the station moved to a new location in 1972. It was moved back to its original site in 1997 and became Ullin's village hall and library in 2012.

The station was added to the National Register of Historic Places on August 18, 1999, as the Illinois Central Railroad Depot.

== Notes ==
Preceding station	Illinois Central Railroad	Following station
Pulaski toward New Orleans	Main Line	Dongola toward Chicago
Preceding station	Chicago and Eastern Illinois Railroad	Following station
Tamms toward Chaffee	Findlay - Chaffee	Cypress toward Findlay
