= Ullin, Illinois =

Ullin
- Village
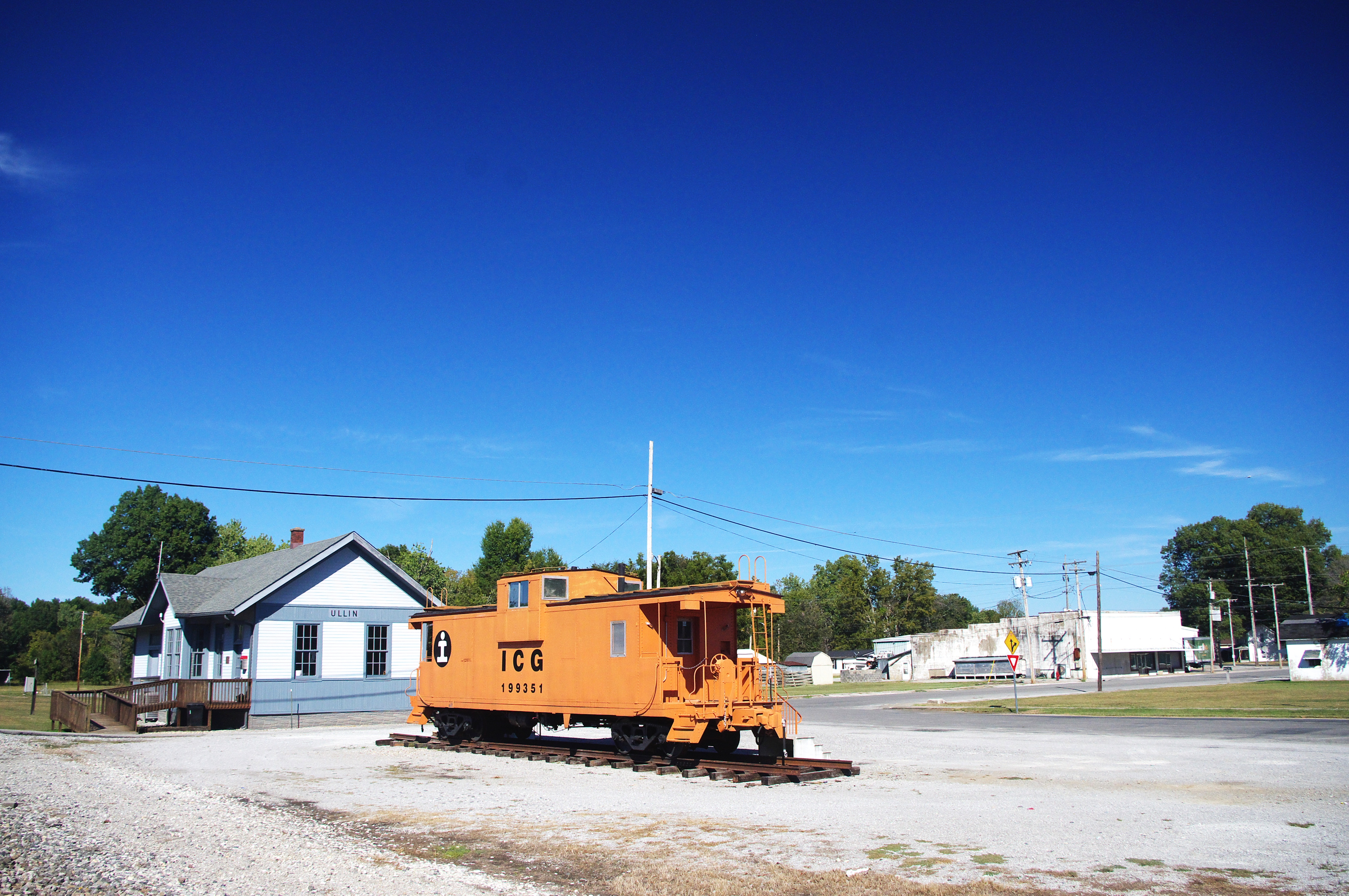
- Ullin, with the ICR Depot on the left

- Location of Ullin in Pulaski County, Illinois.

- Location of Illinois in the United States
- Coordinates: 37°16′40″N 89°10′54″W
- Country: United States
- State: Illinois
- County: Pulaski

Area
  - Total: 2.86 sq mi (7.42 km^{2})
  - Land: 2.81 sq mi (7.28 km^{2})
  - Water: 0.054 sq mi (0.14 km^{2})
- Elevation: 325 ft (99 m)

Population (2020)
  - Total: 466
  - Density: 165.8/sq mi (64.01/km^{2})
- Time zone: UTC-6 (CST)
  - Summer (DST): UTC-5 (CDT)
- ZIP Code(s): 62992
- Area code: 618
- FIPS code: 17-76615
- GNIS feature ID: 2400016
- Wikimedia Commons: Ullin, Illinois

Ullin is a village in Pulaski County, Illinois, United States. The population was 466 at the 2020 census.

== History ==
Ullin was established as a site along the Illinois Central Railroad in the mid-1850s. Some sources suggest it was named for a Gaelic folk hero who frequently appears in the works of the poet Ossian. Other sources suggest it was named for its first postmaster, Samuel Ulen. A post office was established in 1856, and the village was platted the following year. Ullin incorporated in 1900.

== Geography ==
Ullin is located at 37°16′40″N 89°10′54″W (37.277861, -89.181533). The village is situated along the Cache River north of Cairo. The Cypress Creek National Wildlife Refuge lies to the east of Ullin. Interstate 57 passes along the village's eastern border.

According to the 2010 census, Ullin has a total area of 2.862 square miles (7.41 km^{2}), of which 2.81 square miles (7.28 km^{2}) (or 98.18%) is land and 0.052 square miles (0.13 km^{2}) (or 1.82%) is water.

== Demographics ==
Historical population
Census	Pop.	Note	%±
1910	670		—
1920	652		−2.7%
1930	800		22.7%
1940	827		3.4%
1950	773		−6.5%
1960	577		−25.4%
1970	546		−5.4%
1980	550		0.7%
1990	402		−26.9%
2000	779		93.8%
2010	463		−40.6%
2020	466		0.6%
U.S. Decennial Census

As of the census of 2000, there were 779 people, 247 households, and 145 families residing in the village. The population density was 272.1 inhabitants per square mile (105.1/km^{2}). There were 273 housing units at an average density of 95.3 per square mile (36.8/km^{2}). The racial makeup of the village was 57.25% White, 31.84% African American, 7.57% Asian, 0.51% from other races, and 2.82% from two or more races. Hispanic or Latino of any race were 5.91% of the population.

There were 247 households, out of which 30.8% had children under the age of 18 living with them, 37.2% were married couples living together, 15.8% had a female householder with no husband present, and 40.9% were non-families. 38.9% of all households were made up of individuals, and 27.1% had someone living alone who was 65 years of age or older. The average household size was 2.21 and the average family size was 2.97.

In the village, the population was spread out, with 24.1% under the age of 18, 10.5% from 18 to 24, 32.6% from 25 to 44, 17.3% from 45 to 64, and 15.4% who were 65 years of age or older. The median age was 36 years. For every 100 females, there were 129.1 males. For every 100 females age 18 and over, there were 139.3 males.

The median income for a household in the village was $20,000, and the median income for a family was $31,979. Males had a median income of $29,049 versus $21,607 for females. The per capita income for the village was $12,789. About 9.8% of families and 16.8% of the population were below the poverty line, including 11.6% of those under age 18 and 25.4% of those age 65 or over.

== See also ==
- Illinois Central Railroad Depot (Ullin, Illinois)
- Century High School (Ullin, Illinois)
