= McClure House =

McClure House may refer to:

- Highfill-McClure House, Paragould, Arkansas, listed on the NRHP in Greene County, Arkansas
- McClure House (Canon City, Colorado), listed on the National Register of Historic Places in Fremont County, Colorado
- Thomas J. and Caroline McClure House, McClure, Illinois, listed on the NRHP in Alexander County, Illinois
- McClure-Barbee House, Danville, Kentucky, listed on the NRHP in Boyle County, Kentucky
- McClure House (Lyndon, Kentucky), listed on the National Register of Historic Places in Jefferson County, Kentucky
- McClure-Shelby House, Nicholasville, Kentucky, listed on the NRHP in Boyle County
- McClure-Hilton House, Merrimack, New Hampshire, listed on the NRHP in Hillsborough County, New Hampshire
- Nickel Ensor McClure House, Alva, Oklahoma, listed on the NRHP in Woods County, Oklahoma
