= Century High School (Ullin, Illinois) =

Coordinates: 37°16′13″N 89°05′55″W

Location
- 4721 Shawnee College Rd. Ullin, Illinois; United States

Information
- Type: Public
- Motto: Once a Centurion, always a Centurion.
- Established: 1932
- School district: Century Community Unit School District 100
- Principal: Landon Sommer
- Teaching staff: 15.77 (FTE)
- Grades: 6-12
- Enrollment: 154 (2023-2024)
- Student to teacher ratio: 9.77
- Color
- Nickname: Centurions
- Website: CHS

Century High School is located in Ullin, Illinois. It Combines the small towns of Karnak, Illinois, New Grand Chain, Illinois, Ullin, Illinois, Perks, Illinois, and Wetaug, Illinois into one school in Pulaski county. Pulaski County, Illinois.
