= Bill Emerson Memorial Bridge =

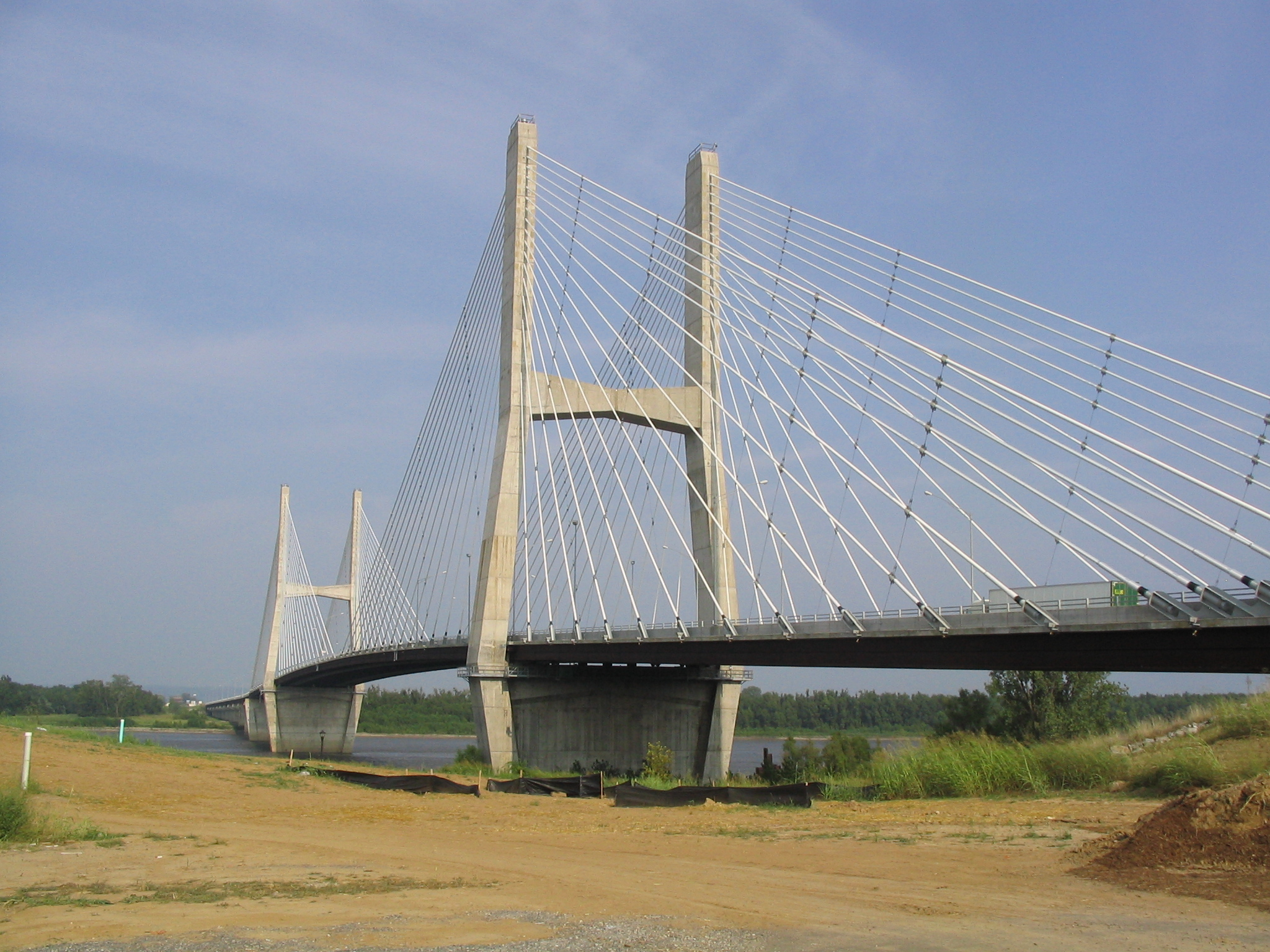
- Coordinates: 37°17′43″N 89°30′57″W
- Carries: 4 lanes of Route 34 / Route 74 / IL 146
- Crosses: Mississippi River
- Locale: Cape Girardeau, Missouri and East Cape Girardeau, Illinois
- Maintained by: Missouri Department of Transportation

Characteristics
- Design: Cable-stayed bridge
- Total length: 3,955 feet (1,205 m)
- Width: 94 feet (29 m)
- Longest span: 1,149 feet (350 m)
- Clearance below: 60 feet (18 m)

History
- Opened: December 13, 2003

Location
- Interactive map of Bill Emerson Memorial Bridge

The Bill Emerson Memorial Bridge is a cable-stayed bridge connecting Missouri's Route 34 and Route 74 with Illinois Route 146 across the Mississippi River between Cape Girardeau, Missouri and East Cape Girardeau, Illinois.

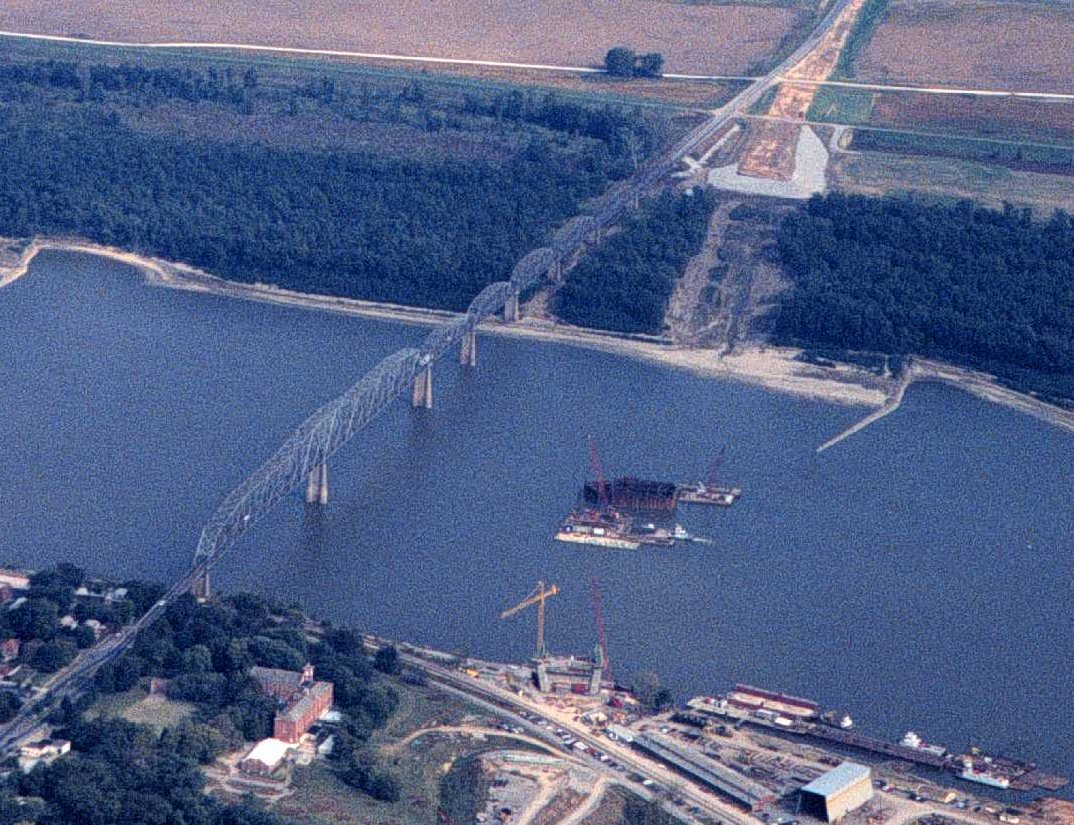
Old Cape Girardeau Bridge with replacement under construction, 1997.

It was built just south of its predecessor, the Cape Girardeau Bridge, which was completed in 1928 and demolished in 2004.

The bridge is named after Bill Emerson, a Missouri politician who served in the U.S. House of Representatives from 1981 until his death in 1996. Planning for the four-lane structure began in June 1987, and construction began in late 1996. Congressman Bill Emerson intended on the bridge to bring (link: Exhibit S.1) the Transamerica Corridor (I-66) into Missouri. Several factors have been blamed for the bridge's many delays in planning and construction, including Illinois' reluctance to participate in the project, as well as issues with the bedrock of the river (this resulted in the hiring of a new contractor).

The bridge is featured in the 2014 David Fincher film Gone Girl.

== See also ==
- List of crossings of the Upper Mississippi River
