= McCluer =

McCluer may refer to:

- John McCluer (c. 1759–1795), British hydrographer
- McCluer High School, in Florissant, Missouri, US
- McCluer North High School, in Florissant, Missouri, US

== See also ==
- McClure (disambiguation)
