= McLure =

McLure is a surname. Notable people with the surname include:

- Carmel McLure, Australian jurist and barrister
- Chester McLure (1875–1955), Canadian politician
- James McLure (1951–2011), American playwright
- James McLure (footballer) (born 1974), Australian rules footballer
- Lindsay McLure (1913–2008), Australian rules footballer
- Tom McLure (1888–1931), American football and baseball player

== See also ==
- McLure, British Columbia, a settlement in British Columbia, Canada
- McClure (disambiguation)
