= Cache Precinct, Illinois =

Cache Precinct
- Precinct
- Location of Cache Precinct in Alexander County
- Coordinates: 37°03′32″N 089°13′11″W
- Country: United States
- State: Illinois
- County: Alexander

Area
  - Total: 66.63 sq mi (172.6 km^{2})
  - Land: 58.33 sq mi (151.1 km^{2})
  - Water: 8.30 sq mi (21.5 km^{2})
- Elevation: 318 ft (97 m)

Population (2020)
  - Total: 225
  - Density: 3.86/sq mi (1.49/km^{2})
- FIPS code: 17-003-90576
- GNIS feature ID: 1928455

Cache Precinct is one of seven precincts in Alexander County, Illinois, United States. As of the 2020 census, its population was 225.

== Geography ==
According to the 2021 census gazetteer files, Cache Precinct has a total area of 66.63 square miles (172.57 km^{2}), of which 58.33 square miles (151.07 km^{2}) (or 87.54%) is land and 8.30 square miles (21.50 km^{2}) (or 12.46%) is water.

=== Unincorporated communities ===
- Cache
- Future City
- Golden Lily
- Miller City
- Roth
- Urbandale
- Willard

== Demographics ==
As of the 2020 census there were 225 people, 111 households, and 69 families residing in the precinct. The population density was 3.38 inhabitants per square mile (1.31/km^{2}). There were 145 housing units at an average density of 2.18 per square mile (0.84/km^{2}). The racial makeup of the precinct was 59.56% White, 30.67% African American, 0.89% Native American, 0.00% Asian, 0.00% Pacific Islander, 0.00% from other races, and 8.89% from two or more races. Hispanic or Latino of any race were 1.33% of the population.

There were 111 households, out of which 13.50% had children under the age of 18 living with them, 21.62% were married couples living together, 18.92% had a female householder with no spouse present, and 37.84% were non-families. 37.80% of all households were made up of individuals, and 20.70% had someone living alone who was 65 years of age or older. The average household size was 2.77 and the average family size was 3.68.

The precinct's age distribution consisted of 8.8% under the age of 18, 4.6% from 18 to 24, 35.5% from 25 to 44, 19.9% from 45 to 64, and 31.3% who were 65 years of age or older. The median age was 47.3 years. For every 100 females, there were 72.5 males. For every 100 females age 18 and over, there were 85.4 males.

The median income for a household in the precinct was $40,852, and the median income for a family was $40,536. Males had a median income of $14,420 versus $50,625 for females. The per capita income for the precinct was $21,734. About 21.7% of families and 30.3% of the population were below the poverty line, including 100.0% of those under age 18 and 18.8% of those age 65 or over.
