= Golden Lily, Illinois =

- Unincorporated community
- Location within Illinois Location within the United States
- Coordinates: 37°04′32″N 89°11′09″W
- Country: United States
- State: Illinois
- County: Alexander
- Precinct: Cache
- Elevation: 308 ft (94 m)
- Time zone: UTC-6 (Central (CST))
  - Summer (DST): UTC-5 (CDT)
- Postal code: 62914
- Area codes: 618/730
- GNIS feature ID: 424933

Golden Lily is an unincorporated community in Cache Precinct, Alexander County, Illinois, United States. Golden Lily is located along Illinois Route 37 west of Mound City.
