= Miller City, Illinois =

- Unincorporated community
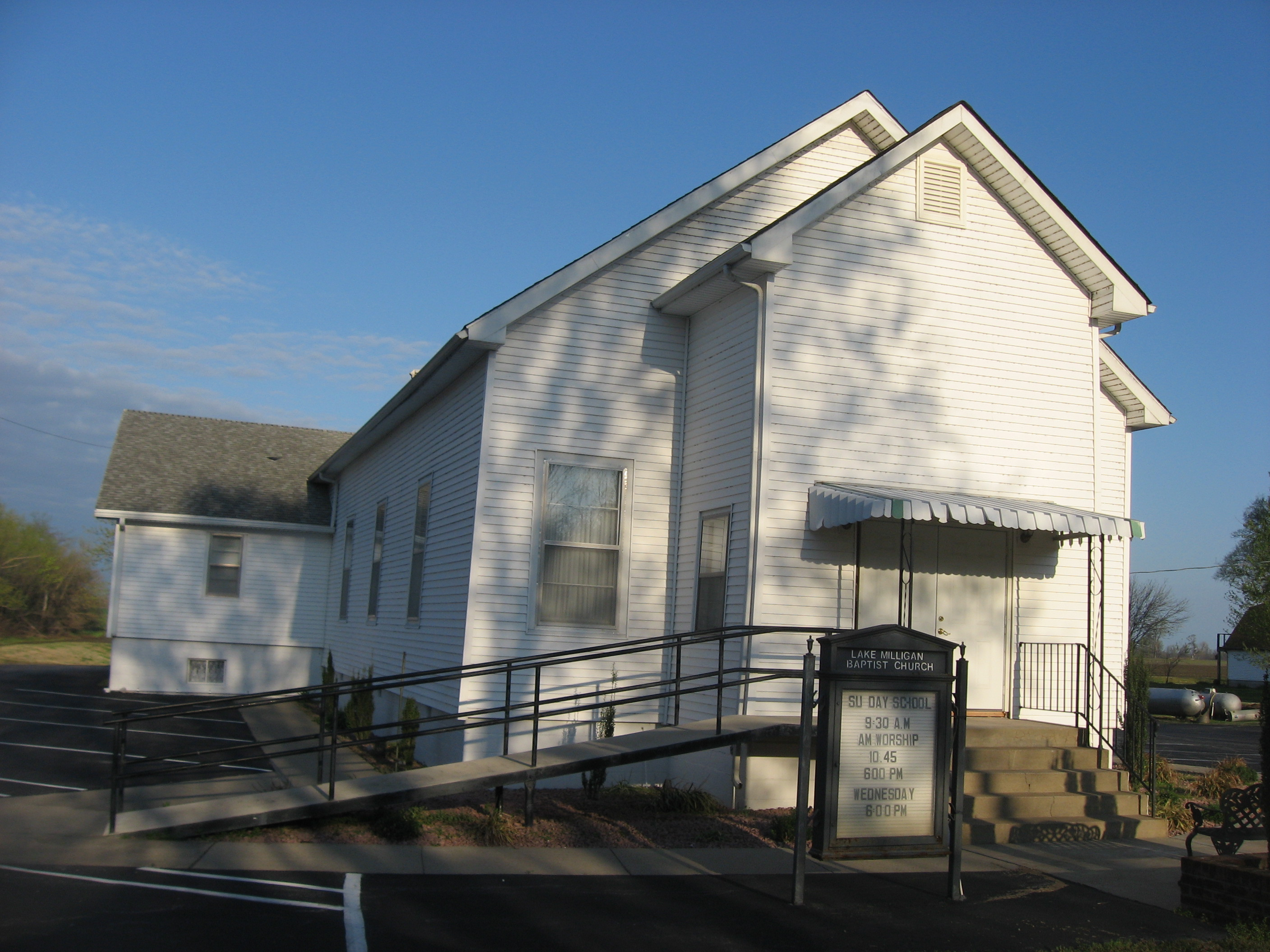
- Lake Milligan Baptist Church at Miller City

- Location within Illinois Location within the United States
- Coordinates: 37°06′39″N 89°21′22″W
- Country: United States
- State: Illinois
- County: Alexander
- Precinct: Cache
- Elevation: 331 ft (101 m)
- Time zone: UTC-6 (Central (CST))
  - Summer (DST): UTC-5 (CDT)
- ZIP code: 62962
- Area codes: 618/730
- GNIS feature ID: 425201

Miller City is an unincorporated community in Cache Precinct, Alexander County, Illinois, United States. Miller City is located by the southwest corner of Horseshoe Lake.

== Education ==
It is in the Cairo School District.
