= Cairo Community Unit School District 1 =

School district in Alexander County, Illinois, United States

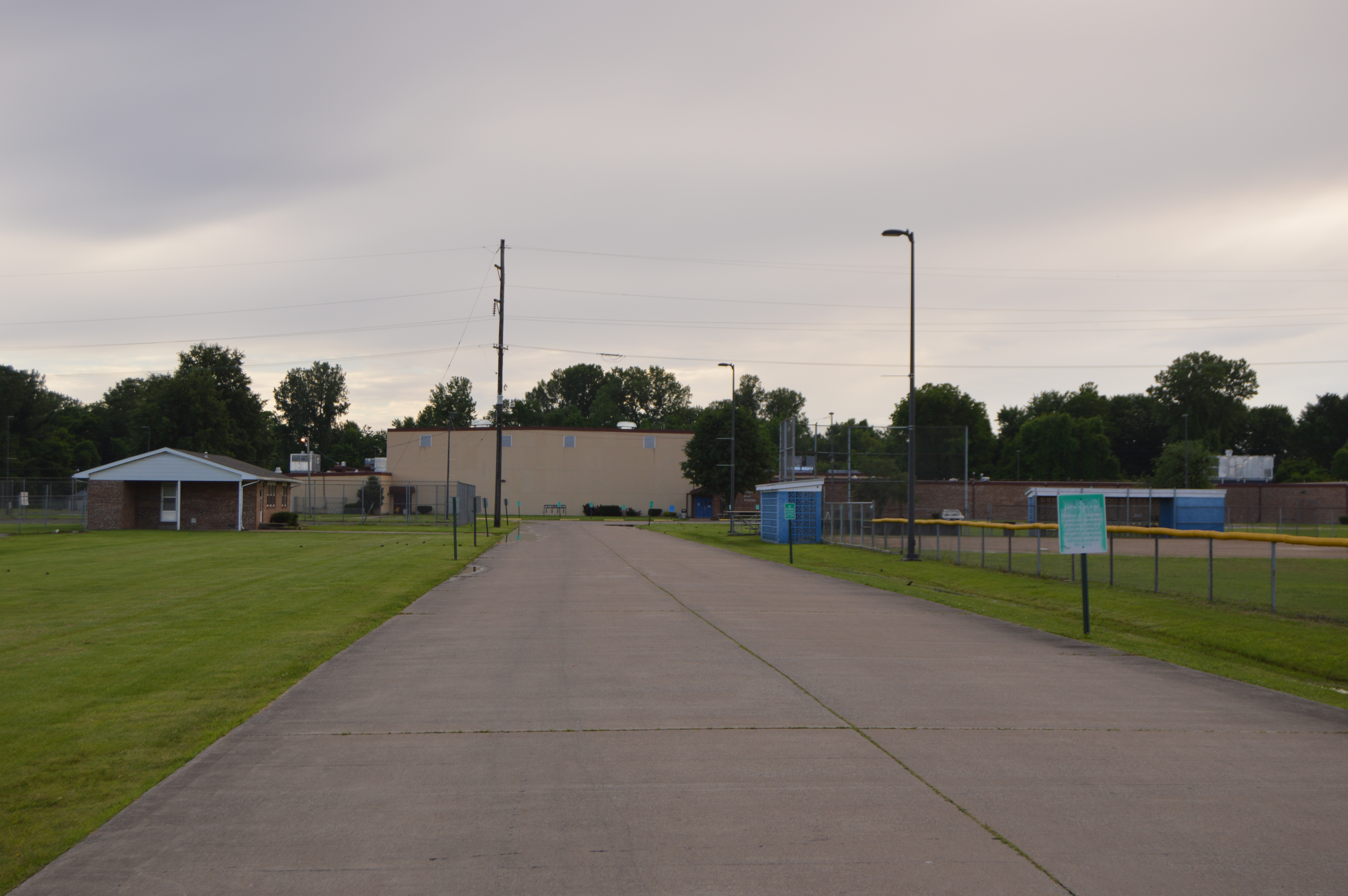
- Cairo Junior/Senior High School seen from Sycamore Street (the facility also has the district administration offices

Address
- 4201 Sycamore St Cairo, Illinois, 62914; United States

District information
- Type: Public
- Grades: PreK–12
- NCES District ID: 1708070

Students and staff
- Students: 276

Other information
- Website: www.cairoschooldistrict1.com

Cairo Community Unit School District 1 is a unified school district located in Cairo, Illinois, which is the county seat of Alexander County. It is composed of two schools: Cairo Elementary School, which educates pre-kindergarteners to sixth graders; and Cairo Junior and Senior High School, which encompasses grades seven through twelve. The district includes the southernmost parts of Alexander County, including the city of Cairo, and the unincorporated areas of Cache, Future City, Klondike, Miller City, and Urbandale. During the 2016–17 school year, the district's enrollment for all grades was 441.

It formerly operated Bennett Elementary School and Cairo Junior High School. In 2005 the former junior high became the Cairo Community Education Center, which has programs operated by the Regional Center for Education, which has a lease from the school district; then the center subleases it to various entities, including Southern Illinois University Carbondale. Bennett Elementary ended operations in 2010.

== History ==
In 2003 it had 905 students. That year the district had financial and academic problems.

== Demographics ==
Based on census estimates, the Cairo school district has the highest percentage in Illinois of children in poverty, 60.6%. This is the fifteenth highest percentage of any city in the United States.

== Academic achievement ==
Circa 2010 the high school's average ACT test score was 15.
