= Thebes Courthouse =

- U.S. National Register of Historic Places
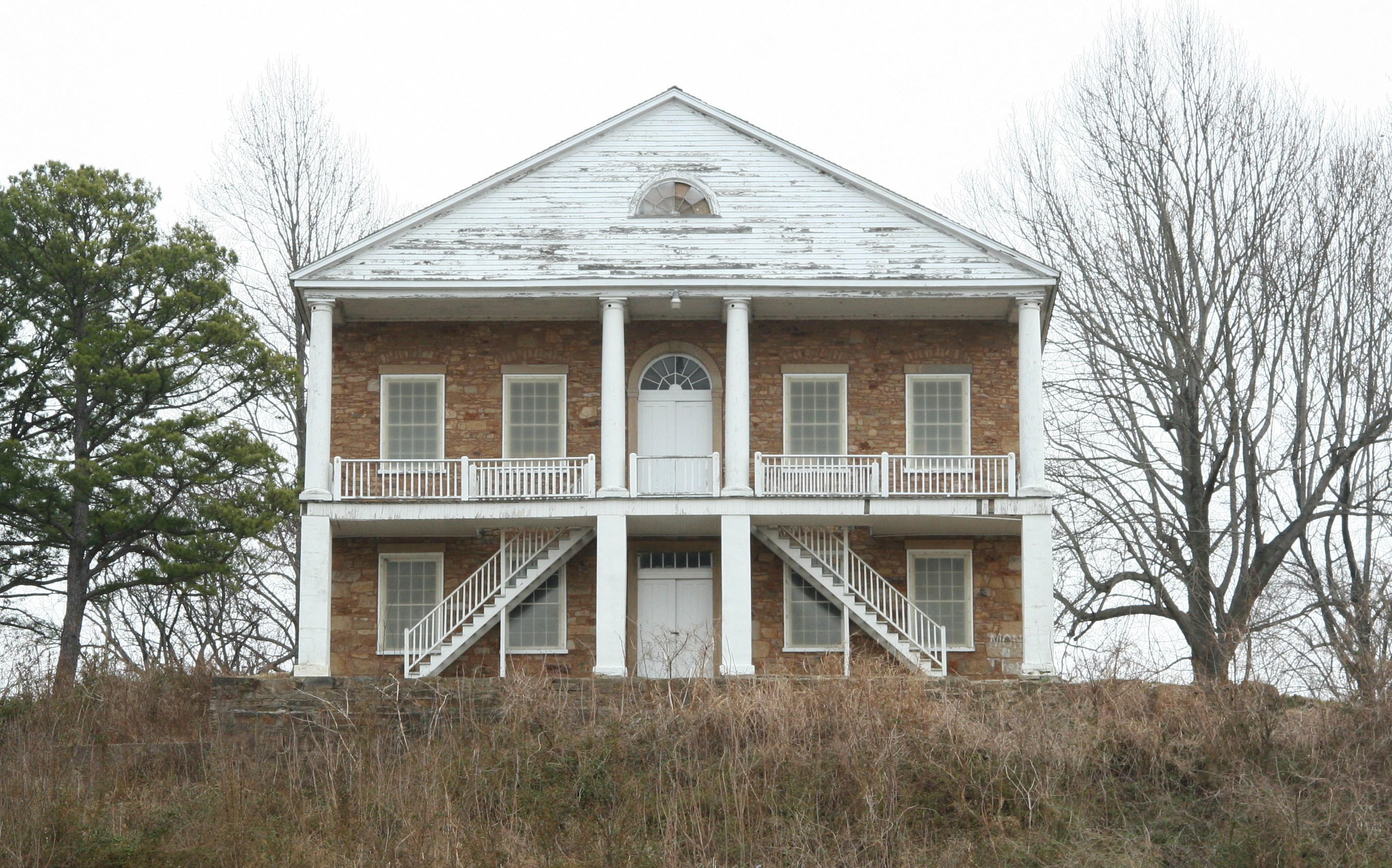
- The courthouse in 2011

- Location within Illinois Location within the United States
- Interactive map showing the location of Thebes Courthouse
- Location: Off IL 3, Thebes, Illinois
- Coordinates: 37°13′11″N 89°27′33″W
- Area: 0.6 acres (0.24 ha)
- Built: 1848
- Built by: Barkhausen, Ernstt
- Architect: Lightner, L. I.
- Architectural style: Southern Greek Revival
- NRHP reference No.: 72000447
- Added to NRHP: December 26, 1972

The Thebes Courthouse in Thebes, Illinois, is the former county courthouse of Alexander County. Plans to build the courthouse began in 1845, when the county seat was moved to Thebes from Unity. Architect L. I. Lightner planned the courthouse, which he designed in a Southern Greek Revival style featuring a two-story porch and four front pillars. Contractor Ernstt Barkhausen built the courthouse for $4,400, and the building was completed in 1848. It served as Alexander County's courthouse until the county seat was moved to Cairo in 1860.

The courthouse was added to the National Register of Historic Places on December 26, 1972. It now serves as the headquarters of the Thebes Historical Society.
