= Tamms station =

- Chicago and Eastern Illinois Railroad Depot
- U.S. National Register of Historic Places
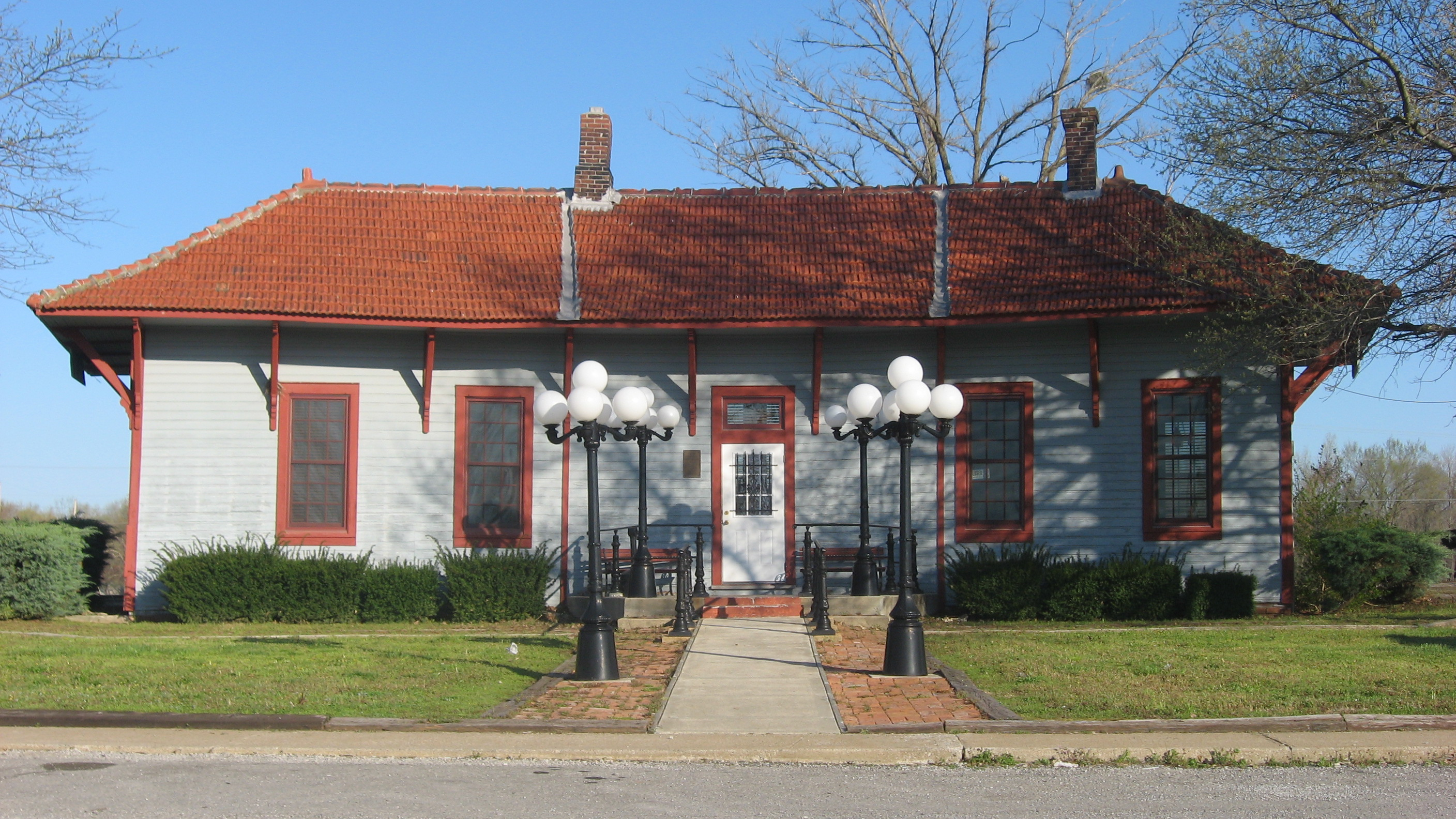

- Location within Illinois Location within the United States
- Location: Front St., Tamms, Illinois
- Coordinates: 37°14′7″N 89°16′11″W
- Area: 2 acres (0.81 ha)
- Built: 1899
- NRHP reference No.: 86003168
- Added to NRHP: November 6, 1986

The Tamms Depot, also known as the Chicago and Eastern Illinois Railroad Depot, is a historic railroad station located on Front Street in Tamms, Illinois. Built in 1899, the depot served trains on both the Gulf, Mobile and Ohio Railroad and the Chicago and Eastern Illinois Railroad. In an unusual arrangement, dispatchers for both railways used the same office in the station. The depot served both passenger and freight trains; the freight trains exported the town's agricultural products, which included livestock, poultry, dairy, and cotton. In addition, the depot functioned as a social center for the town and was the site of numerous business transactions.

The depot closed in 1955 when passenger service on the line ended. After the Chicago and Eastern Illinois Railroad threatened to demolish the station, the village bought the building in 1982. The village restored the depot using donations from local residents, and after completing the restoration in 1986, the Village Hall was moved to the depot. The depot was added to the National Register of Historic Places on November 6, 1986.

| Preceding station | Chicago and Eastern Illinois Railroad | Following station |
|---|---|---|
| Fayville toward Chaffee | Findlay - Chaffee | Ullin toward Findlay |
