= East Cape Girardeau, Illinois =

- Village
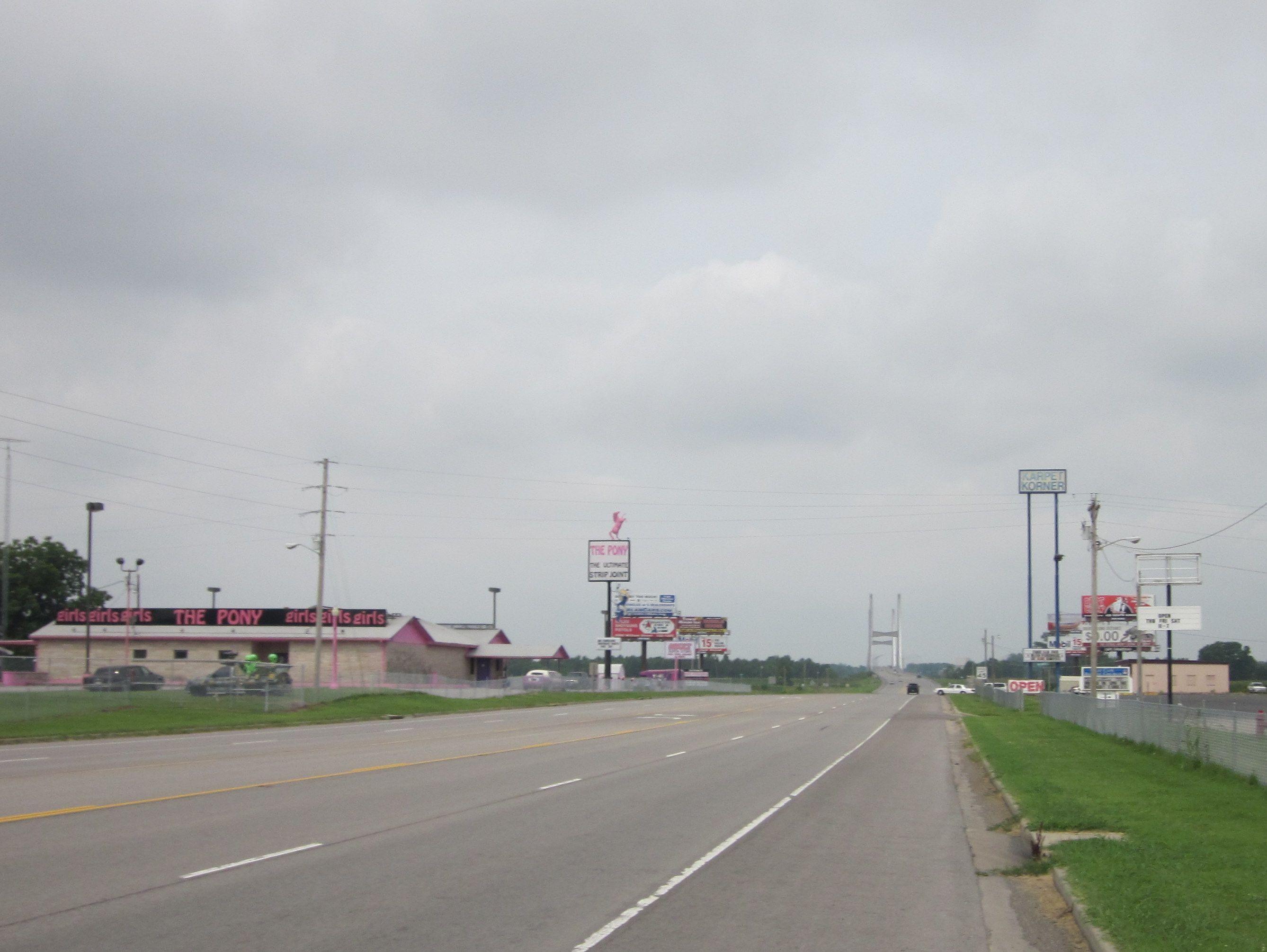
- On Illinois Route 146 in East Cape Girardeau
- Interactive map of East Cape Girardeau, Illinois
- Location within Illinois
- Coordinates: 37.2940°N 89.4802°W
- Country: United States
- State: Illinois
- County: Alexander
- Precinct: McClure
- Incorporated: 1975

Government
  - Mayor: Marlene Freeman
  - Trustees: Mandy Bradley; Rebecca Livingston

Area
  - Total: 1.995 sq mi (5.167 km^{2})
  - Land: 1.961 sq mi (5.078 km^{2})
  - Water: 0.034 sq mi (0.089 km^{2}) 1.70%
- Elevation: 335 ft (102 m)

Population (2020)
  - Total: 289
  - Estimate (2025): 251
  - Density: 147/sq mi (56.9/km^{2})
- Time zone: UTC–6 (Central (CST))
  - Summer (DST): UTC–5 (CDT)
- ZIP Code: 62957
- Area codes: 618 and 730
- FIPS code: 17-21605
- GNIS feature ID: 2398772
- Highway: IL 146

East Cape Girardeau is a village in McClure Precinct, Alexander County, Illinois, United States. The population was 289 as of the 2020 census, and was estimated at 251 in 2025. It is part of the Cape Girardeau–Jackson metropolitan area, including areas on both the Missouri and Illinois sides of the Mississippi River.

== History ==
A post office was established at East Cape Girardeau in 1874, and remained in operation until 1913. The village lies east of Cape Girardeau, Missouri, hence the name.

== Geography ==
According to the United States Census Bureau, the village has an area of 1.995 square miles (5.17 km^{2}), of which 1.961 square miles (5.08 km^{2}) is land and 0.034 square miles (0.09 km^{2}) (1.70%) is water.

East Cape Girardeau is across the Mississippi River from Cape Girardeau, Missouri. The two are connected by the Bill Emerson Memorial Bridge which opened in December 2003 following the demolition of the Old Mississippi River Bridge constructed in 1928.

== Demographics ==
Historical population
Census	Pop.	Note	%±
1980	539		—
1990	451		−16.3%
2000	437		−3.1%
2010	385		−11.9%
2020	289		−24.9%
2025 (est.)	251		−13.1%
U.S. Decennial Census; 2020 Census

As of the 2024 American Community Survey, there were 114 estimated households in East Cape Girardeau with an average of 2.48 persons per household. The village has a median household income of $42,188. Approximately 29.0% of the village's population lives at or below the poverty line. East Cape Girardeau has an estimated 40.2% employment rate, with 12.2% of the population holding a bachelor's degree or higher and 87.3% holding a high school diploma. There were 187 housing units at an average density of 95.36 per square mile (36.82/km^{2}).

The top five reported languages (people were allowed to report up to two languages, thus the figures will generally add to more than 100%) were English (98.5%), Spanish (1.1%), Indo-European (0.0%), Asian and Pacific Islander (0.4%), and Other (0.0%).

The median age in the village was 39.3 years.

East Cape Girardeau, Illinois – racial and ethnic composition Note: the US Census treats Hispanic/Latino as an ethnic category. This table excludes Latinos from the racial categories and assigns them to a separate category. Hispanics/Latinos may be of any race.
Race / ethnicity (NH = non-Hispanic)	Pop. 2000	Pop. 2010	Pop. 2020	% 2000	% 2010	% 2020
White alone (NH)	420	365	236	96.11%	94.81%	81.66%
Black or African American alone (NH)	3	13	21	0.69%	3.38%	7.27%
Native American or Alaska Native alone (NH)	0	0	0	0.00%	0.00%	0.00%
Asian alone (NH)	1	0	1	0.23%	0.00%	0.35%
Pacific Islander alone (NH)	0	0	0	0.00%	0.00%	0.00%
Other race alone (NH)	0	0	0	0.00%	0.00%	0.00%
Mixed race or multiracial (NH)	3	7	23	0.69%	1.82%	7.96%
Hispanic or Latino (any race)	10	0	8	2.29%	0.00%	2.77%
Total	437	385	289	100.00%	100.00%	100.00%

=== 2020 census ===
As of the 2020 census, there were 289 people, 127 households, and 81 families residing in the village. The population density was 147.37 inhabitants per square mile (56.90/km^{2}). There were 161 housing units at an average density of 82.10 per square mile (31.70/km^{2}). The racial makeup of the village was 82.70% White, 7.27% African American, 0.00% Native American, 0.35% Asian, 0.00% Pacific Islander, 0.69% from some other races and 9.00% from two or more races. Hispanic or Latino people of any race were 2.77% of the population.

There were 127 households, out of which 23.5% had children under the age of 18 living with them, 45.75% were married couples living together, 2.61% had a female householder with no husband present, and 45.75% were non-families. 33.33% of all households were made up of individuals, and 21.57% had someone living alone who was 65 years of age or older. The average household size was 3.33 and the average family size was 2.80.

The village's age distribution consisted of 26.8% under the age of 18, 1.4% from 18 to 24, 31.3% from 25 to 44, 21.3% from 45 to 64, and 19.3% who were 65 years of age or older. The median age was 39.8 years. For every 100 females, there were 117.8 males. For every 100 females age 18 and over, there were 96.3 males.

The median income for a household in the village was $37,875, and the median income for a family was $48,194. Males had a median income of $34,554 versus $20,313 for females. The per capita income for the village was $17,811. About 8.4% of families and 27.7% of the population were below the poverty line, including 30.7% of those under age 18 and 2.4% of those age 65 or over.

=== 2010 census ===
As of the 2010 census, there were 385 people, 166 households, and 107 families residing in the village. The population density was 196.33 inhabitants per square mile (75.80/km^{2}). There were 185 housing units at an average density of 94.34 per square mile (36.42/km^{2}). The racial makeup of the village was 94.81% White, 3.38% African American, 0.00% Native American, 0.00% Asian, 0.00% Pacific Islander, 0.00% from some other races and 1.82% from two or more races. Hispanic or Latino people of any race were 0.00% of the population.

=== 2000 census ===
As of the 2000 census, there were 437 people, 196 households, and 130 families residing in the village. The population density was 222.00 inhabitants per square mile (85.71/km^{2}). There were 235 housing units at an average density of 119.38 per square mile (46.09/km^{2}). The racial makeup of the village was 97.25% White, 0.69% African American, 0.00% Native American, 0.23% Asian, 0.00% Pacific Islander, 1.14% from some other races and 0.69% from two or more races. Hispanic or Latino people of any race were 2.29% of the population.

There were 196 households, out of which 32.1% had children under the age of 18 living with them, 49.5% were married couples living together, 14.3% had a female householder with no husband present, and 33.2% were non-families. 30.1% of all households were made up of individuals and 12.8% had someone living alone who was 65 years of age or older. The average household size was 2.23 and the average family size was 2.72.

In the village the population was spread out with 22.7% under the age of 18, 8.2% from 18 to 24, 27.9% from 25 to 44, 25.6% from 45 to 64, and 15.6% who were 65 years of age or older. The median age was 39 years. For every 100 females there were 95.1 males. For every 100 females age 18 and over, there were 94.3 males.

The median income for a household in the village was $29,688, and the median income for a family was $33,897. Males had a median income of $31,932 versus $16,875 for females. The per capita income for the village was $14,420. 10.5% of the population and 10.9% of families were below the poverty line. Out of the total people living in poverty, 6.8% were under the age of 18 and 9.1% were 65 or older.
