= Thomas J. and Caroline McClure House =

Historic house in Illinois, United States

- U.S. National Register of Historic Places
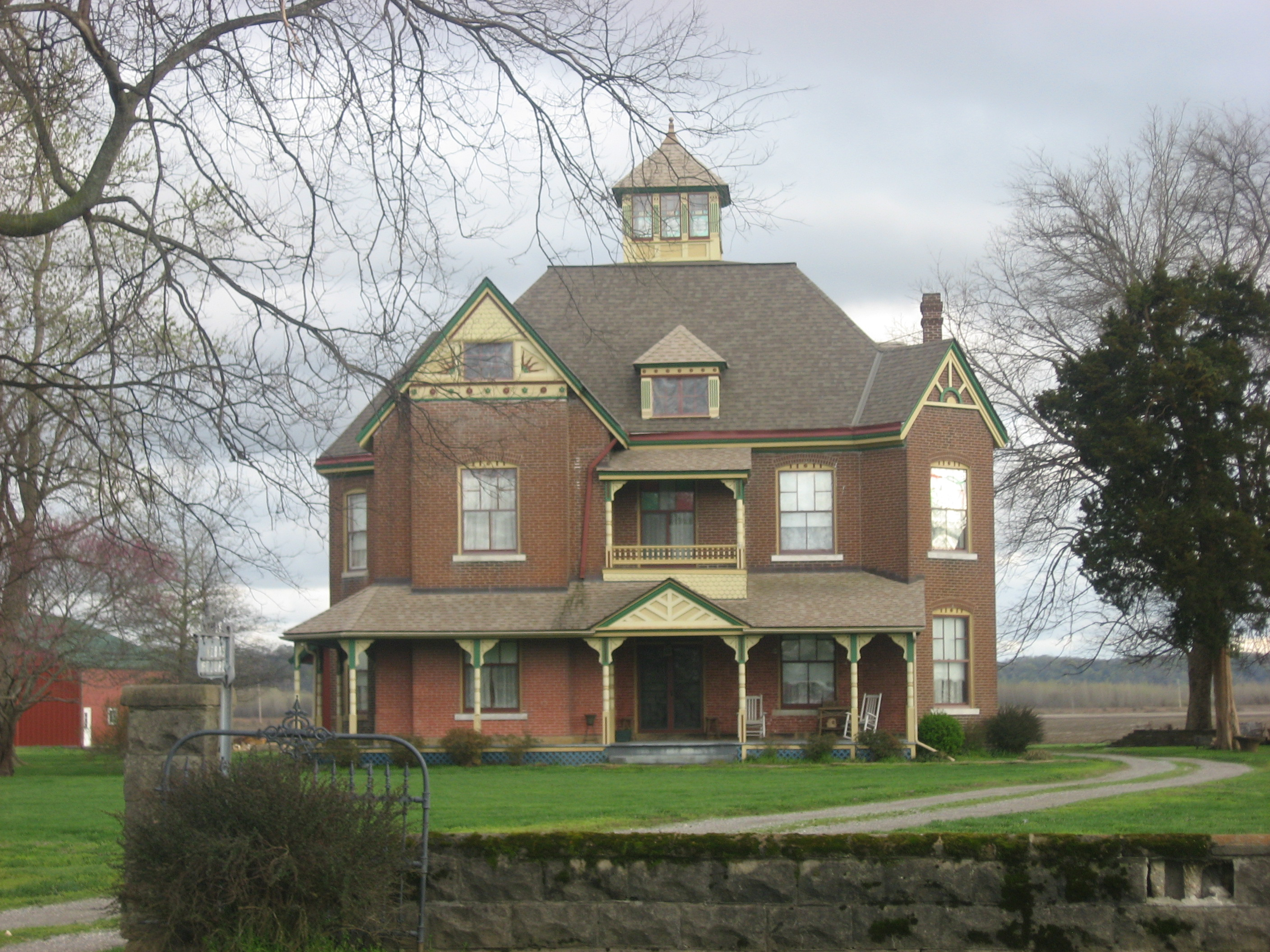

- Location within Illinois Location within the United States
- Location: Main St., .5 mi. E of IL 3, McClure, Illinois
- Coordinates: 37°19′11″N 89°25′42″W
- Area: 3 acres (1.2 ha)
- Built: 1882
- Architectural style: Queen Anne
- NRHP reference No.: 96001341
- Added to NRHP: November 15, 1996

The Thomas J. and Caroline McClure House is a historic house in McClure, Illinois. The Queen Anne style house was built in 1882 for farmers Thomas J. and Caroline McClure. It was added to the National Register of Historic Places on November 15, 1996.

== History ==
Thomas J. and Caroline McClure, who married in 1853, were both farmers and agricultural businesspeople. The couple took up residence in the village, then known as Clear Creek, where they kept a store, a lumber mill, a flour mill, a blacksmith shop, and 3,000 acres (1,200 ha) of farmland. The couple primarily grew wheat on their land, which led to the community changing its name to Wheatland in 1887. In addition to their business pursuits, the couple raised seven children.

In 1882, the McClures commissioned a new house for their family. Thomas McClure died before the house was completed, but Caroline lived in the home until her death in 1918. The couple's son J. T., whose family lived in the house until 1946, was a successful farmer and livestock raiser. J.T. McClure also served as the village's postmaster and had the village's name changed to McClure in 1895. As of the 1990s, the house was still owned and occupied by descendants of the McClure family.

== Architecture ==
The McClure house was designed in the Queen Anne style, which was popular nationally in the early 1880s; it also features some elements of the Italianate style. The house is mainly built of red brick, with a sandstone foundation and wooden decorations. A porch runs the length of the front side of the house and wraps around the northeast corner. A gable with a sunburst pattern sits over the porch at the front entrance. The double entrance doors are topped by a stained glass transom. An additional porch is located on the second story directly above the entrance.

A large gable is located on the left side of the front facade. The gable is decorated with a patterned belt course, fishscale shingles, and sunburst patterns on either side of the main window. Another gable, also decorated with sunburst patterns, is located on the northwest corner of the house. A projecting three-sided bay of windows spans both stories on the house's east side. A square cupola sits at the peak of the hip-and-gable roof, while two dormers protrude from the north and west sides of the roof. The roof is also topped by four tall, rectangular brick chimneys and a smaller square chimney which was likely a later addition.
