= America, Illinois =

- Unincorporated community
- Location within Illinois Location within the United States
- Coordinates: 37°08′18″N 89°07′25″W
- Country: United States
- State: Illinois
- County: Pulaski
- Elevation: 354 ft (108 m)
- Time zone: UTC-6 (Central (CST))
  - Summer (DST): UTC-5 (CDT)
- Area code: 618
- GNIS feature ID: 422407

America is an unincorporated community in Pulaski County, Illinois, United States. It lies 5 miles (8.0 km) northeast of Mound City.

Founded in part by the American entrepreneur Justus Post, Post made attempts to establish a community like the one he had previously constructed near St. Louis, Missouri that is now today Chesterfield, Missouri. It was the county seat of Alexander County, Illinois, from the county's establishment in 1819 until Unity became the county seat in 1833. In 1843, when Pulaski County was created, America became part of the new county. On February 14, 1881, a post office was established in America, Illinois, and was discontinued on September 15, 1942. America, Illinois is now a part of the 62996 ZIP code of Villa Ridge, Illinois.
