= McClure, Illinois =

Incorporated Village in McClure Illinois, United States

- Village
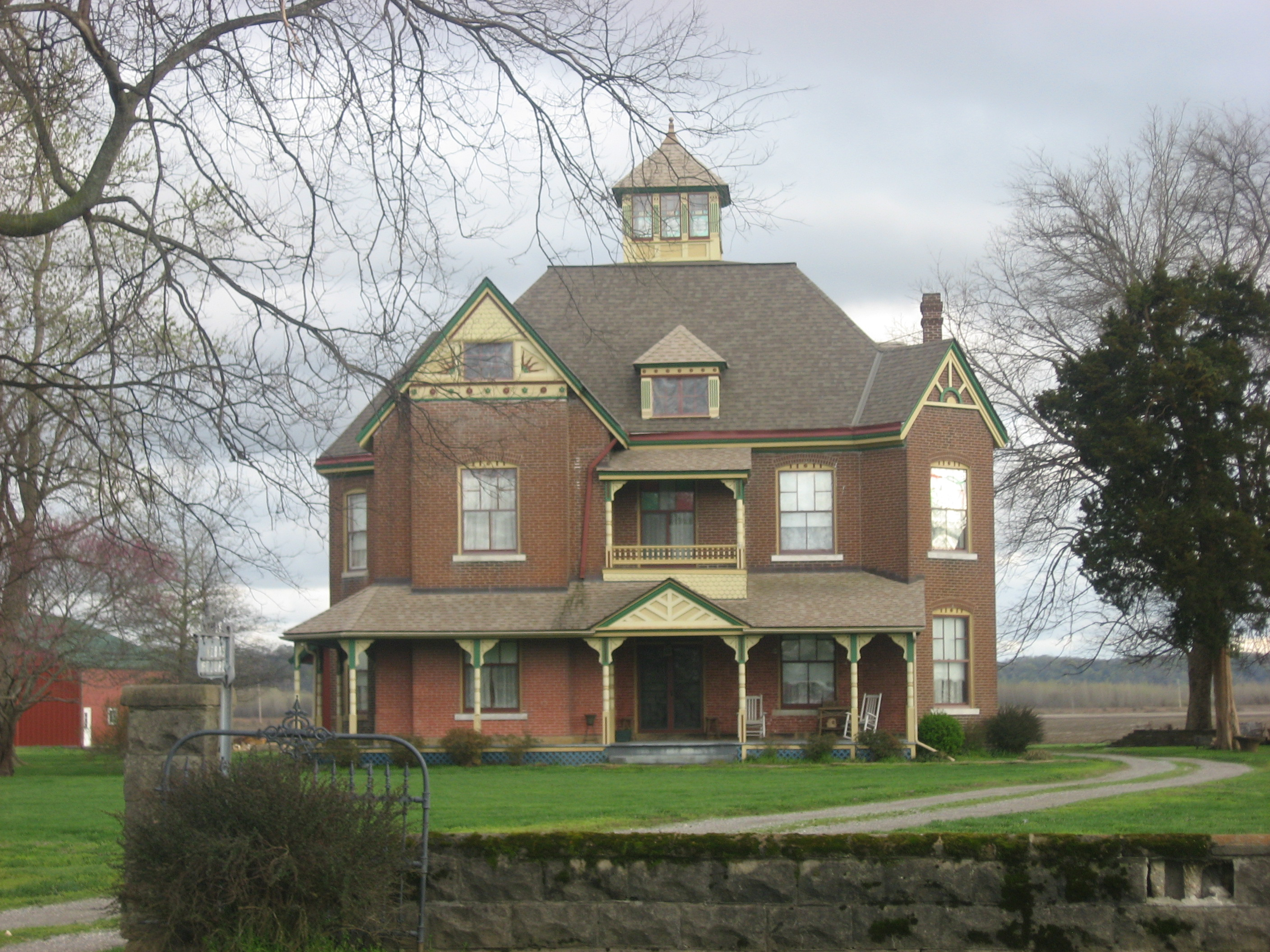
- Thomas J. and Caroline McClure House, a historic site in the village

- Location of McClure in Illinois

- Location of Illinois in the United States
- Coordinates: 37°19′04″N 89°25′53″W
- Country: United States
- State: Illinois
- County: Alexander
- Precinct: McClure
- Settled: 1811
- Incorporated: 2004

Area
  - Total: 1.53 sq mi (3.96 km^{2})
  - Land: 1.53 sq mi (3.96 km^{2})
  - Water: 0 sq mi (0.00 km^{2}) 0%
- Elevation: 338 ft (103 m)

Population (2020)
  - Total: 256
  - Estimate (2024): 224 ▼
  - Density: 167.5/sq mi (64.69/km^{2})
- Time zone: UTC-6 (CST)
  - Summer (DST): UTC-5 (CDT)
- ZIP Code(s): 62957
- Area code: 618
- FIPS code: 17-45525
- GNIS feature ID: 2399286
- Wikimedia Commons: McClure, Illinois

McClure is a village in McClure Precinct, Alexander County, Illinois, United States. It had a population of 256 at the 2020 census.

McClure is part of the Cape Girardeau–Jackson Metropolitan Statistical Area.

== History ==
McClure was first settled in 1811. The community of McClure was established prior to 1836, the year its post office opened, and was originally known as Clear Creek Landing or Clear Creek. The community's name was changed to Wheatland in 1887 due to the large wheat fields in the region. Thomas J. McClure, for whose family the village was eventually named, moved to the village in 1842; he and his wife Caroline became prominent local farmers and raised seven children. Their son J. T. became the village postmaster, and he had the post office's name changed to McClure in 1895 to avoid confusion with the Wheaton, Illinois post office. By the 1930s, the village had two train stations, a sizable business district, and a population of roughly 400. The village has since declined and now has relatively few businesses.

In 2004, McClure was incorporated as a village.

The McClure family's house has been listed on the National Register of Historic Places.

== Demographics ==
Historical population
Census	Pop.	Note	%±
2010	402		—
2020	256		−36.3%
U.S. Decennial Census

=== 2020 census ===
Note: the US Census treats Hispanic/Latino as an ethnic category. This table excludes Latinos from the racial categories and assigns them to a separate category. Hispanics/Latinos can be of any race.

As of the 2020 census there were 256 people, 111 households, and 79 families residing in the village. The population density was 167.54 inhabitants per square mile (64.69/km^{2}). There were 153 housing units at an average density of 100.13 per square mile (38.66/km^{2}). The racial makeup of the village was 93.36% White, 1.17% African American, 0.78% from other races, and 4.69% from two or more races. Hispanic or Latino of any race were 0.78% of the population.

There were 111 households, out of which 14.4% had children under the age of 18 living with them, 47.75% were married couples living together, 22.52% had a female householder with no husband present, and 28.83% were non-families. 27.93% of all households were made up of individuals, and 12.61% had someone living alone who was 65 years of age or older. The average household size was 2.51 and the average family size was 2.17.

The village's age distribution consisted of 8.7% under the age of 18, 4.1% from 18 to 24, 14.6% from 25 to 44, 41.4% from 45 to 64, and 31.1% who were 65 years of age or older. The median age was 55.8 years. For every 100 females, there were 89.8 males. For every 100 females age 18 and over, there were 84.9 males.

The median income for a household in the village was $42,614, and the median income for a family was $51,250. Males had a median income of $28,958 versus $25,000 for females. The per capita income for the village was $23,432. About 19.0% of families and 18.8% of the population were below the poverty line, including 63.2% of those under age 18 and 14.7% of those age 65 or over.

McClure racial composition (NH = Non-Hispanic)
Race	Number	Percentage
White (NH)	238	92.97%
Black or African American (NH)	3	1.17%
Some Other Race (NH)	2	0.78%
Mixed/Multi-Racial (NH)	11	4.3%
Hispanic or Latino	2	0.78%
Total	256	
