= Willard, Illinois =

- Unincorporated community
- Location within Illinois Location within the United States
- Coordinates: 37°05′11″N 89°21′08″W
- Country: United States
- State: Illinois
- County: Alexander
- Precinct: Cache
- Elevation: 322 ft (98 m)
- Time zone: UTC-6 (Central (CST))
  - Summer (DST): UTC-5 (CDT)
- ZIP code: 62962
- Area codes: 618/730
- GNIS feature ID: 425639

Willard is an unincorporated community in Cache Precinct, Alexander County, Illinois, United States. Willard is located in southwest Alexander County. It is located at the neck of Dogtooth Bend and Dogtooth Island, a fluvial oxbow bend and island in the Mississippi River.
