= Urbandale, Illinois =

- Unincorporated community
- Location within Illinois Location within the United States
- Coordinates: 37°03′10″N 89°11′09″W
- Country: United States
- State: Illinois
- County: Alexander
- Precinct: Cache
- Elevation: 312 ft (95 m)
- Time zone: UTC-6 (Central (CST))
  - Summer (DST): UTC-5 (CDT)
- ZIP code: 62914
- Area codes: 618/730
- GNIS feature ID: 425592

Urbandale is an unincorporated community in Cache Precinct, Alexander County, Illinois, United States. Urbandale is located on Illinois Route 37 north of Cairo. Urbandale is located at latitude 37.053 and longitude -89.186. The elevation of Urbandale is 312 feet (95 m).

== Education ==
It is in the Cairo School District.
