= Alexander County, Illinois =

County in Illinois, United States

- County
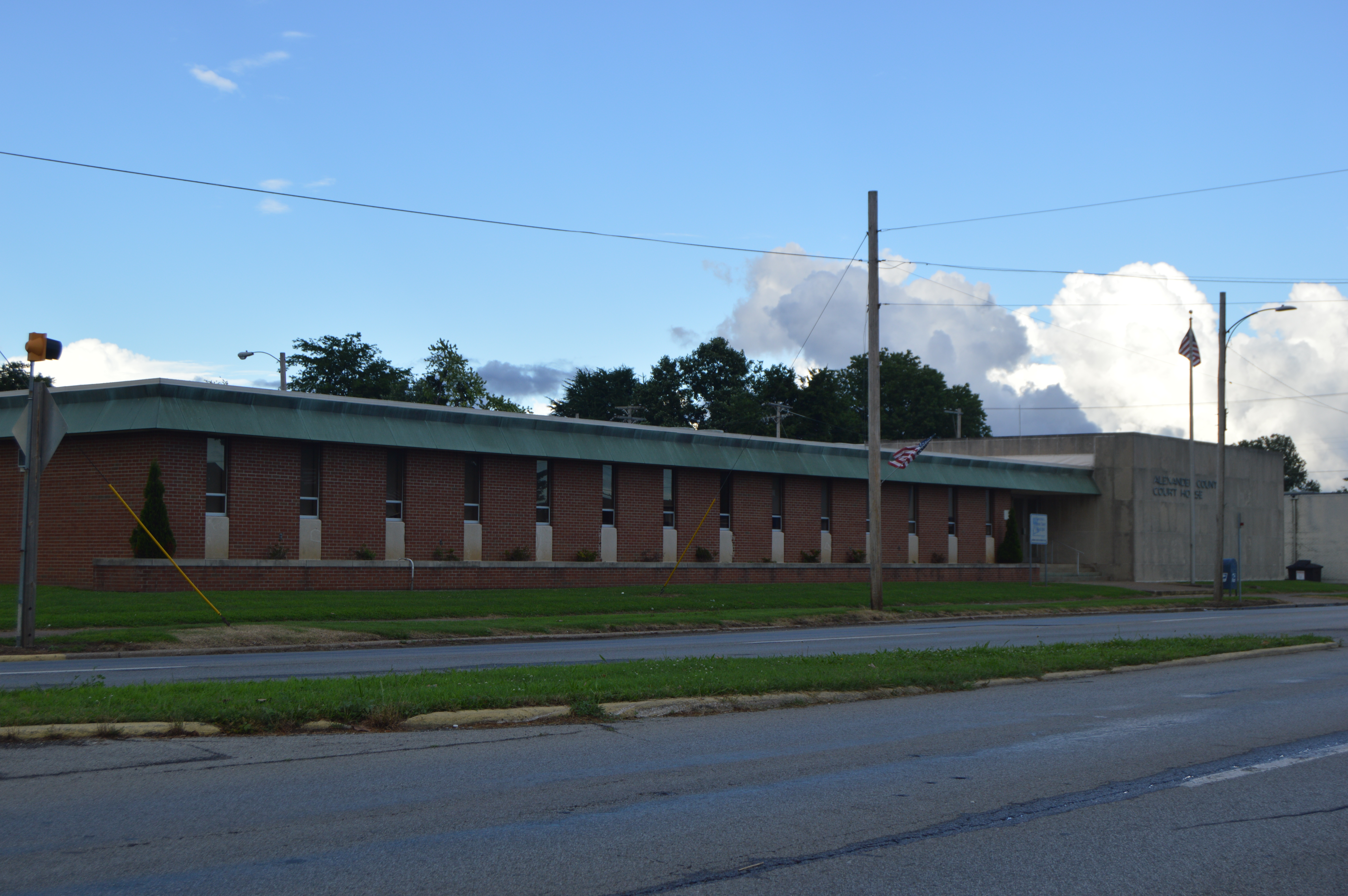
- Alexander County Courthouse in Cairo

- Location within the U.S. state of Illinois
- Coordinates: 37°11′N 89°20′W
- Country: United States
- State: Illinois
- Founded: 1819
- Named for: William M. Alexander
- Seat: Cairo
- Largest city: Cairo

Area
  - Total: 253 sq mi (660 km^{2})
  - Land: 236 sq mi (610 km^{2})
  - Water: 17 sq mi (44 km^{2}) 6.8%

Population (2020)
  - Total: 5,240
  - Estimate (2025): 4,570 ▼
  - Density: 22.2/sq mi (8.57/km^{2})
- Time zone: UTC−6 (Central)
  - Summer (DST): UTC−5 (CDT)
- Congressional district: 12th
- Website: alexandercounty.illinois.gov

Alexander County is the southernmost county in the U.S. state of Illinois. In the 2020 census, the population was 5,240. Its county seat is Cairo and its western boundary is formed by the Mississippi River.

Alexander County is part of the Cape Girardeau–Jackson metropolitan area which is made up of jurisdictions on both sides of the Mississippi River.

== History ==
Alexander County was organized from part of Union County in 1819. It was named for William M. Alexander, a physician who practiced in the town of America, the first county seat. Alexander was elected as a representative to the state House, where he became Speaker of the Illinois House of Representatives in 1822.

The county was initially developed for agriculture and settled by numerous migrants from the Upland South. The county seat was moved to Unity in 1833, then to Thebes in 1843, and finally to Cairo in 1860. America, the first county seat, is now within Pulaski County, which was formed from Alexander and Johnson counties in 1843.

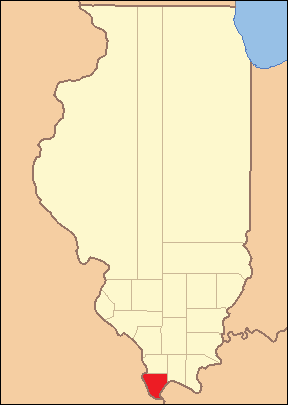
Alexander County between 1819 and 1843.

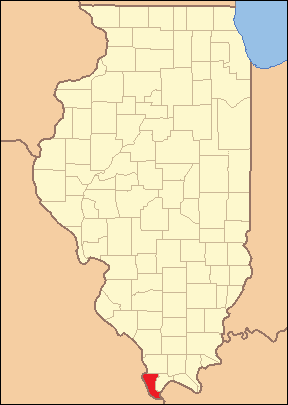
Alexander County reduced to its current borders in 1843 with the creation of Pulaski County.

Settled largely by white migrants from the Upland South (who migrated from backwoods areas of Kentucky, Virginia, Tennessee, Georgia, and the Carolinas), southern Illinois had many racial attitudes of the South. As African Americans settled in Cairo to seek jobs on steamboats, ferries, in shipping and railroads, there were tensions between the racial groups. White residents sometimes used violence and terrorism, as well as discrimination, to keep black residents in second-class positions. They excluded them from the city government and the police and fire departments, and relatively few African Americans were hired to work in the local stores.

There were three lynchings of blacks in Alexander County in the years between Reconstruction and the early 20th century. The county had the second-highest number of lynchings of African Americans in all of Illinois. The most notorious of these was the lynching of Will James before a crowd of white spectators estimated at 10,000, in the county seat of Cairo on November 11, 1909. James was accused of murdering a young white woman. Later that same evening, the mob lynched a white man named Henry Salzner, hanging him in the courthouse square for allegedly killing his wife. Neither man had had a trial, nor was anyone ever prosecuted for the lynchings, even though Illinois had passed an anti-lynching law four years earlier.

== Geography ==
The county has a total area of 253 square miles (660 km^{2}), of which 236 square miles (610 km^{2}) is land and 17 square miles (44 km^{2}) (6.8%) is water. Its borders are partly defined by the Mississippi River and the Ohio River. The lowest point in the state of Illinois is located on the Mississippi River in Cairo in Alexander County, where it flows out of Illinois and into Kentucky.

=== Adjacent counties ===
- Union County - north
- Ballard County, Kentucky - southeast
- Pulaski County - east
- Mississippi County, Missouri - south
- Scott County, Missouri - west
- Cape Girardeau County, Missouri - northwest

=== National protected areas ===
- Cypress Creek National Wildlife Refuge (part)
- Shawnee National Forest (part)

=== Major highways ===
- Interstate 57
- U.S. Route 51
- U.S. Route 60
- U.S. Route 62
- Illinois Route 3
- Illinois Route 37
- Illinois Route 127
- Illinois Route 146

== Climate and weather ==
Cairo, Illinois

Climate chart (precipitation, max. and min. temperature)
J	F	M	A	M	J	J	A	S	O	N	D
3.2 41 26	3.6 48 30	4.4 58 39	4.7 69 50	4.8 78 59	4.2 86 67	4.4 90 71	3.6 87 69	3 81 61	3.4 71 49	4.4 57 39	4.2 46 30
- █ Average max. and min. temperatures in °F
- █ Precipitation totals in inches
- Source: The Weather Channel
Metric conversion
J	F	M	A	M	J	J	A	S	O	N	D
82 5 −3	90 9 −1	112 14 4	120 21 10	121 26 15	105 30 19	111 32 22	92 31 21	77 27 16	87 22 9	112 14 4	106 8 −1
- █ Average max. and min. temperatures in °C
- █ Precipitation totals in mm

In recent years, average temperatures in the county seat of Cairo have ranged from a low of 26 °F (−3 °C) in January to a high of 90 °F (32 °C) in July. A record low of −12 °F (−24 °C) was recorded in January 1985. A record high of 104 °F (40 °C) was recorded in June 1954. Average monthly precipitation ranges from 3.04 inches (77 mm) in September to 4.76 inches (121 mm) in May.

== Law enforcement ==
The Tamms Correctional Center, a now shuttered super-maximum correctional facility operated by the Illinois Department of Corrections, was located in Tamms, as was the State of Illinois execution chamber. Prior to the January 2003, commutation of death row sentences, male death row inmates were housed in Tamms, Menard, and Pontiac correctional centers. After that date, only Pontiac continued to host the male death row. In January 2013, after years of controversy over inmate conditions, the prison closed, negatively impacting the county's economy.

In late September 2009, press reports indicated that the Alexander County Sheriff's office had five of its seven squad cars repossessed as payments had not been made. The sheriff once had 29 deputies, but was reduced to just five at the time of the reports. The Illinois State Police have provided assistance to the county with additional patrols.

== Demographics ==
Historical population
Census	Pop.	Note	%±
1820	626		—
1830	1,390		122.0%
1840	3,313		138.3%
1850	2,484		−25.0%
1860	4,707		89.5%
1870	10,564		124.4%
1880	14,808		40.2%
1890	16,563		11.9%
1900	19,384		17.0%
1910	22,741		17.3%
1920	23,980		5.4%
1930	22,542		−6.0%
1940	25,496		13.1%
1950	20,316		−20.3%
1960	16,061		−20.9%
1970	12,015		−25.2%
1980	12,264		2.1%
1990	10,626		−13.4%
2000	9,590		−9.7%
2010	8,238		−14.1%
2020	5,240		−36.4%
2025 (est.)	4,570	▼	−12.8%
U.S. Decennial Census; 1790-1960 1900-1990; 1990-2000 2010-2020 2020

2000 census age pyramid for Alexander County.

=== 2020 census ===
In the 2020 census, there were 5,240 people, 2,154 households, and 1,357 families residing in the county. Between 2010 and 2020, the population of Alexander County decreased to 5,240. The 36.4% decline was the largest of any of the 3,138 U.S. counties. Although the population of the county had been decreasing for decades, the closure of the Tamms Correctional Center in 2013 probably caused an acceleration of the decline in the 2010s.

The median age was 49.1 years. 19.1% of residents were under the age of 18 and 24.8% of residents were 65 years of age or older. For every 100 females there were 95.9 males, and for every 100 females age 18 and over there were 94.0 males age 18 and over.

The racial makeup of the county was 63.2% White, 30.9% Black or African American, 0.5% American Indian and Alaska Native, 0.1% Asian, <0.1% Native Hawaiian and Pacific Islander, 0.4% from some other race, and 5.0% from two or more races. Hispanic or Latino residents of any race comprised 1.6% of the population.

3.1% of residents lived in urban areas, while 96.9% lived in rural areas.

There were 2,384 households in the county, of which 22.6% had children under the age of 18 living in them. Of all households, 37.0% were married-couple households, 23.5% were households with a male householder and no spouse or partner present, and 33.2% were households with a female householder and no spouse or partner present. About 37.8% of all households were made up of individuals and 18.3% had someone living alone who was 65 years of age or older.

There were 2,946 housing units, of which 19.1% were vacant. Among occupied housing units, 74.3% were owner-occupied and 25.7% were renter-occupied. The homeowner vacancy rate was 1.9% and the rental vacancy rate was 7.5%.

=== 2010 census ===
In the 2010 United States census, there were 8,238 people, 3,329 households, and 2,093 families residing in the county. The population density was 35.0 inhabitants per square mile (13.5/km^{2}). There were 4,006 housing units at an average density of 17.0 per square mile (6.6/km^{2}).

The racial makeup of the county was 60.9% white, 35.4% black or African American, 0.3% American Indian, 0.2% Asian, 0.1% Pacific islander, 1.4% from other races, and 1.7% from two or more races. Those of Hispanic or Latino origin made up 1.9% of the population. In terms of ancestry, 13.9% were German, 6.8% were Irish, 5.3% were English, and 4.7% were American.

Of the 3,329 households, 29.6% had children under the age of 18 living with them, 39.6% were married couples living together, 18.5% had a female householder with no husband present, 37.1% were non-families, and 33.6% of all households were made up of individuals. The average household size was 2.31 and the average family size was 2.94. The median age was 41.1 years.

The median income for a household in the county was $28,833 and the median income for a family was $44,699. Males had a median income of $35,880 versus $25,743 for females. The per capita income for the county was $15,858. About 11.8% of families and 20.1% of the population were below the poverty line, including 33.1% of those under age 18 and 14.7% of those age 65 or over.

=== Racial and ethnic composition ===
Alexander County, Illinois – Racial and ethnic composition Note: the US Census treats Hispanic/Latino as an ethnic category. This table excludes Latinos from the racial categories and assigns them to a separate category. Hispanics/Latinos may be of any race.
Race / Ethnicity (NH = Non-Hispanic)	Pop 1980	Pop 1990	Pop 2000	Pop 2010	Pop 2020	% 1980	% 1990	% 2000	% 2010	% 2020
White alone (NH)	8,342	7,025	5,968	4,983	3,274	68.02%	66.11%	62.23%	60.49%	62.48%
Black or African American alone (NH)	3,757	3,480	3,338	2,908	1,612	30.63%	32.75%	34.81%	35.30%	30.76%
Native American or Alaska Native alone (NH)	12	17	26	25	22	0.10%	0.16%	0.27%	0.30%	0.42%
Asian alone (NH)	44	48	35	16	6	0.36%	0.45%	0.36%	0.19%	0.11%
Native Hawaiian or Pacific Islander alone (NH)	x	x	2	6	0	x	x	0.02%	0.07%	0.00%
Other race alone (NH)	6	2	3	5	8	0.05%	0.02%	0.03%	0.06%	0.15%
Mixed race or Multiracial (NH)	x	x	1,849	140	236	x	x	19.28%	1.70%	4.50%
Hispanic or Latino (any race)	103	54	138	155	82	0.84%	0.51%	1.44%	1.88%	1.56%
Total	12,264	10,626	11,359	8,238	5,240	100.00%	100.00%	100.00%	100.00%	100.00%

== Education ==
Here is a list of school districts with any territory in the county, no matter how slight, even if the schools and/or administrative offices are located in other counties:

- Cairo Unified School District 1
- Century Community Unit School District 100
- Egyptian Community Unit School District 5
- Meridian Community Unit School District 101
- Shawnee Community Unit School District 84

== Communities ==
Community	Community type	Population	Total Area	Water Area	Land Area	Pop. Density
Cairo (seat)	city	1,733	9.11	2.12	6.99	248.03
East Cape Girardeau	village	289	2.00	0.03	1.96	147.37
McClure	village	256	1.53	0.00	1.53	167.54
Olive Branch	census-designated place	650	9.45	0.01	9.45	68.80
Tamms	village	430	2.33	0.00	2.33	184.39
Thebes	village	208	2.31	0.57	1.75	119.20
Unity	census-designated place	98	0.70	0.00	0.70	139.80
Alexander County	county	5,240	253	17	236	21

=== Unincorporated communities ===
- Cache
- Diswood
- Elco
- Fayville
- Future City
- Gale
- Golden Lily
- Klondike
- Miller City
- Roth
- Sandusky
- Urbandale
- Willard

==== Diswood ====
Diswood is located (37°13′53″N 89°19′22″W) on the eastern edge of the Shawnee National Forest west of Tamms. The Egyptian Community Unit School District facilities are south of Diswood.

=== Forts ===
- Fort Defiance

=== Precincts ===
- Cache
- McClure
- Olive Branch
- Sandusky
- Tamms
- Thebes

== Politics ==
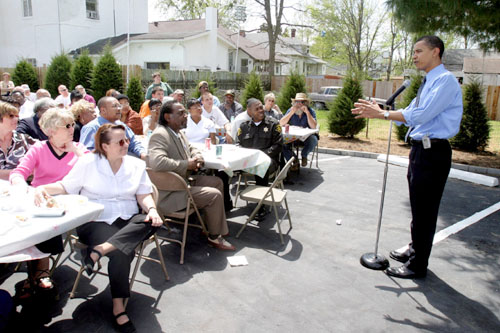
April 15, 2004, Barack Obama speaks at a luncheon in the city of Cairo, during his US Senate campaign

Alexander County is unique among antebellum free state rural counties in having a postbellum political history largely determined by a significant black electorate. It is most similar in this respect to – though still substantially different from – some counties of the south and the Eastern Shore of Maryland. The county was thus solidly Republican until the New Deal, and gradually turned solidly Democratic up through the presidency of Bill Clinton.

In the twenty-first century, the county has shown a trend towards the GOP due to large-scale black emigration to larger cities and a rapid swing of its white population toward Republican candidates. This became clear in 2016, when Donald Trump carried the county by 8.3 points—a hard swing from favorite son Obama's 13.6-point victory four years earlier, and the first time the county voted Republican since 1972.

An even harder swing was taken in 2020, when he carried Alexander again by 14.2 points, even as the nation as a whole trended slightly leftward. Dick Durbin lost the county in the simultaneous U.S. Senate election, making it his first Senate election in which he failed to win the county and the first Senate election since 1972 in which a Republican won the county.

Despite the rightward swing taken by the county, the city and county seat of Cairo remains overwhelmingly Democratic.

United States presidential election results for Alexander County, Illinois
Year	Republican		Democratic		Third party(ies)	
Year	No.	%	No.	%	No.	%
1892	2,053	53.93%	1,674	43.97%	80	2.10%
1896	2,802	60.35%	1,813	39.05%	28	0.60%
1900	2,790	60.76%	1,760	38.33%	42	0.91%
1904	3,203	63.11%	1,686	33.22%	186	3.67%
1908	3,790	63.85%	2,027	34.15%	119	2.00%
1912	2,003	41.79%	1,936	40.39%	854	17.82%
1916	5,395	56.76%	3,940	41.45%	170	1.79%
1920	5,287	61.92%	3,167	37.09%	85	1.00%
1924	4,465	58.10%	2,639	34.34%	581	7.56%
1928	5,666	61.24%	3,558	38.46%	28	0.30%
1932	4,729	44.90%	5,653	53.67%	151	1.43%
1936	5,553	43.89%	6,972	55.10%	128	1.01%
1940	6,260	48.20%	6,591	50.75%	137	1.05%
1944	4,792	49.73%	4,767	49.47%	78	0.81%
1948	4,561	49.05%	4,641	49.91%	96	1.03%
1952	5,219	54.63%	4,305	45.06%	29	0.30%
1956	4,425	51.38%	4,167	48.38%	21	0.24%
1960	4,143	47.96%	4,477	51.83%	18	0.21%
1964	2,895	37.80%	4,763	62.20%	0	0.00%
1968	2,540	36.63%	2,929	42.24%	1,465	21.13%
1972	3,669	59.09%	2,482	39.97%	58	0.93%
1976	2,349	41.52%	3,246	57.37%	63	1.11%
1980	2,650	46.67%	2,925	51.51%	103	1.81%
1984	2,574	47.08%	2,872	52.53%	21	0.38%
1988	1,954	41.90%	2,693	57.75%	16	0.34%
1992	1,301	29.83%	2,566	58.83%	495	11.35%
1996	1,212	28.16%	2,753	63.96%	339	7.88%
2000	1,588	39.48%	2,357	58.60%	77	1.91%
2004	1,831	47.28%	2,016	52.05%	26	0.67%
2008	1,692	42.87%	2,189	55.46%	66	1.67%
2012	1,487	42.47%	1,965	56.13%	49	1.40%
2016	1,496	53.05%	1,262	44.75%	62	2.20%
2020	1,486	56.70%	1,114	42.50%	21	0.80%
2024	1,341	58.92%	904	39.72%	31	1.36%

== See also ==
- National Register of Historic Places listings in Alexander County, Illinois
- List of counties in Illinois
