= Thebes, Illinois =

- Village
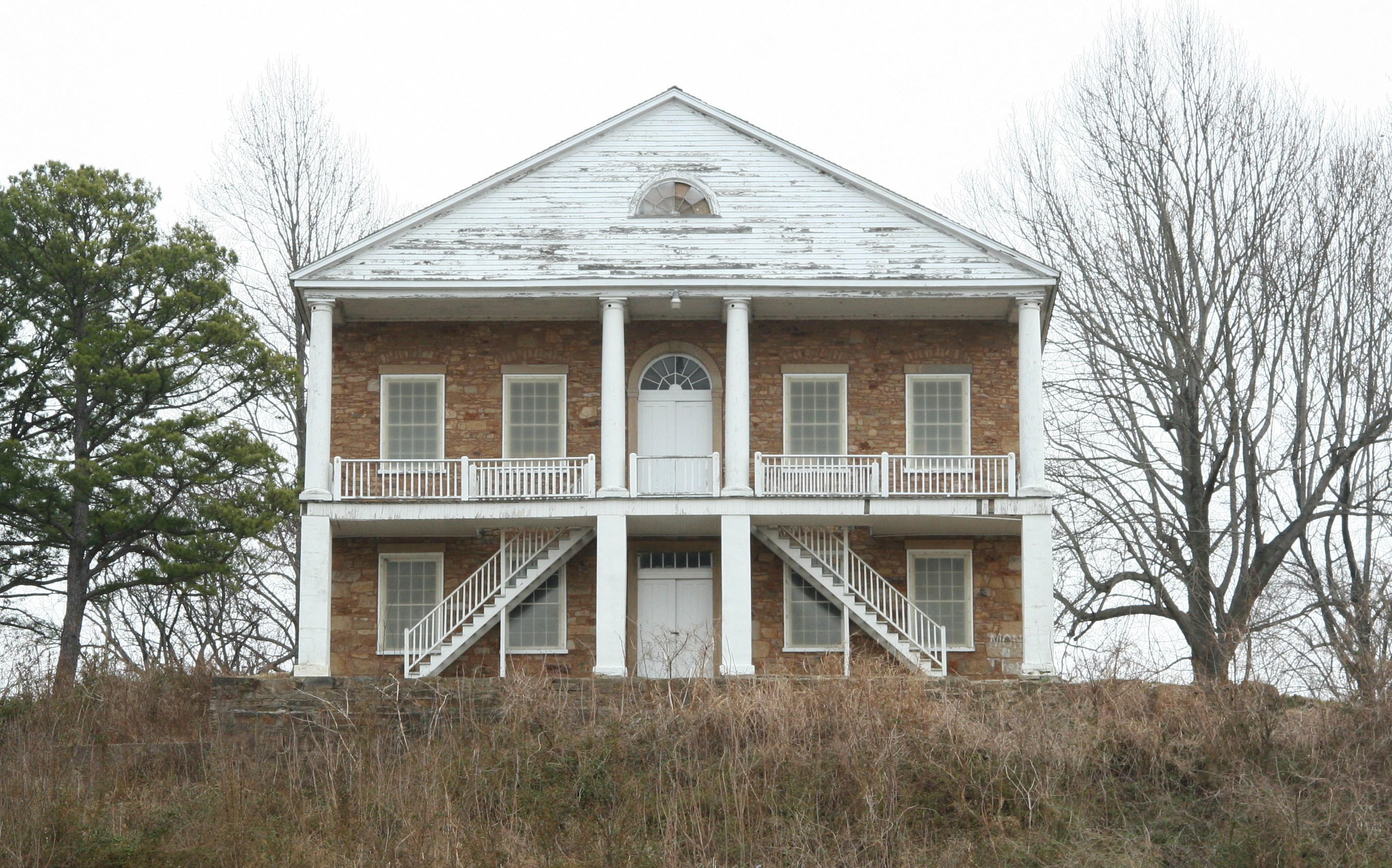
- Thebes Courthouse, listed on the National Register of Historic Places

- Location of Thebes in Illinois

- Location of Illinois in the United States
- Coordinates: 37°13′9″N 89°27′25″W
- Country: United States
- State: Illinois
- County: Alexander
- Precinct: Thebes
- Established: October 15, 1835
- Platted: March 2, 1846
- Incorporated: December 6, 1899

Area
  - Total: 2.31 sq mi (5.99 km^{2})
  - Land: 1.75 sq mi (4.52 km^{2})
  - Water: 0.57 sq mi (1.47 km^{2})
- Elevation: 453 ft (138 m)

Population (2020)
  - Total: 208
  - Estimate (2024): 182 ▼
  - Density: 119.2/sq mi (46.01/km^{2})
- Time zone: UTC-6 (CST)
  - Summer (DST): UTC-5 (CDT)
- ZIP Code(s): 62990
- Area code: 618
- FIPS code: 17-74873
- GNIS feature ID: 2399967
- Wikimedia Commons: Thebes, Illinois

Thebes is a village in Thebes Precinct, Alexander County, Illinois, United States. The population was 208 at the 2020 census, down from 436 at the 2010 census. It is part of the Cape Girardeau–Jackson, MO-IL Metropolitan Statistical Area. In 1860 the county seat was moved to Cairo, at the confluence of the Ohio and Mississippi rivers.

== History ==
Thebes was established in 1835 and platted on March 2, 1846. At first it was known as Sparhawk Landing. It was the county seat of Alexander County from 1846 until 1859. On December 6, 1899, Thebes was incorporated as a village.

Thebes, like the city of Cairo, also in Alexander County, is named after the Egyptian city of the same name. This part of southern Illinois is known as Little Egypt.

Abraham Lincoln practiced law here. Legend holds that Dred Scott, a slave whose freedom suit reached the Supreme Court, may have been imprisoned in the local courthouse jail for a time while his case was heard. He had claimed freedom after being held in a free state but, setting aside decades of precedent, the US Supreme Court held that African Americans had no rights under the constitution, and slaves had no standing to sue for freedom (see Dred Scott v. Sanford).

As the Mississippi River at Thebes is more than four feet deep, the town became a busy steamboat port. Union troops passed through Thebes on their way to attack the South during the American Civil War. Thebes was the site of the lynching of William Johnson on April 26, 1903. Thebes Bridge, an important railroad bridge, opened for rail traffic in 1905 and is still in use today.

In 1923, Thebes elected a woman Nora Gammon to the mayorship and an all-woman slate of alderman, running on a law enforcement platform.

In literature, Thebes is the home village of Captain Andy Hawks, his wife Parthenia Ann Hawks, and daughter Magnolia in the Edna Ferber novel Show Boat (1926).

== Geography ==
Thebes is located at 37°13′9″N 89°27′25″W (37.219177, −89.456915).

According to the 2021 census gazetteer files, Thebes has a total area of 2.31 square miles (5.98 km^{2}), of which 1.75 square miles (4.53 km^{2}) (or 75.44%) is land and 0.57 square miles (1.48 km^{2}) (or 24.56%) is water.

== Demographics ==
Historical population
Census	Pop.	Note	%±
1880	114		—
1900	417		—
1910	717		71.9%
1920	857		19.5%
1930	751		−12.4%
1940	730		−2.8%
1950	541		−25.9%
1960	471		−12.9%
1970	442		−6.2%
1980	455		2.9%
1990	461		1.3%
2000	478		3.7%
2010	436		−8.8%
2020	208		−52.3%
U.S. Decennial Census

=== 2020 census ===
Note: the US Census treats Hispanic/Latino as an ethnic category. This table excludes Latinos from the racial categories and assigns them to a separate category. Hispanics/Latinos can be of any race.

As of the 2020 census there were 208 people, 136 households, and 107 families residing in the village. The population density was 89.93 inhabitants per square mile (34.72/km^{2}). There were 111 housing units at an average density of 47.99 per square mile (18.53/km^{2}). The racial makeup of the village was 88.94% White, 3.37% African American, 0.00% Native American, 0.00% Asian, 0.00% Pacific Islander, 0.96% from other races, and 6.73% from two or more races. Hispanic or Latino of any race were 6.25% of the population.

There were 136 households, out of which 51.5% had children under the age of 18 living with them, 53.68% were married couples living together, 21.32% had a female householder with no husband present, and 21.32% were non-families. 15.44% of all households were made up of individuals, and 6.62% had someone living alone who was 65 years of age or older. The average household size was 4.77 and the average family size was 4.04.

The village's age distribution consisted of 47.6% under the age of 18, 4.9% from 18 to 24, 23.6% from 25 to 44, 16.9% from 45 to 64, and 6.9% who were 65 years of age or older. The median age was 20.6 years. For every 100 females, there were 67.2 males. For every 100 females age 18 and over, there were 54.0 males.

The median income for a household in the village was $38,929, and the median income for a family was $43,750. Males had a median income of $30,417 versus $21,429 for females. The per capita income for the village was $12,080. About 31.8% of families and 33.8% of the population were below the poverty line, including 46.6% of those under age 18 and 13.2% of those age 65 or over.

Thebes racial composition (NH = Non-Hispanic)
Race	Number	Percentage
White (NH)	176	84.62%
Black or African American (NH)	7	3.37%
Mixed/Multi-Racial (NH)	12	5.77%
Hispanic or Latino	13	6.25%
Total	208	

== Education ==
Residents are zoned to the Egyptian School District.
