= James W. Reid (architect) =

American architect

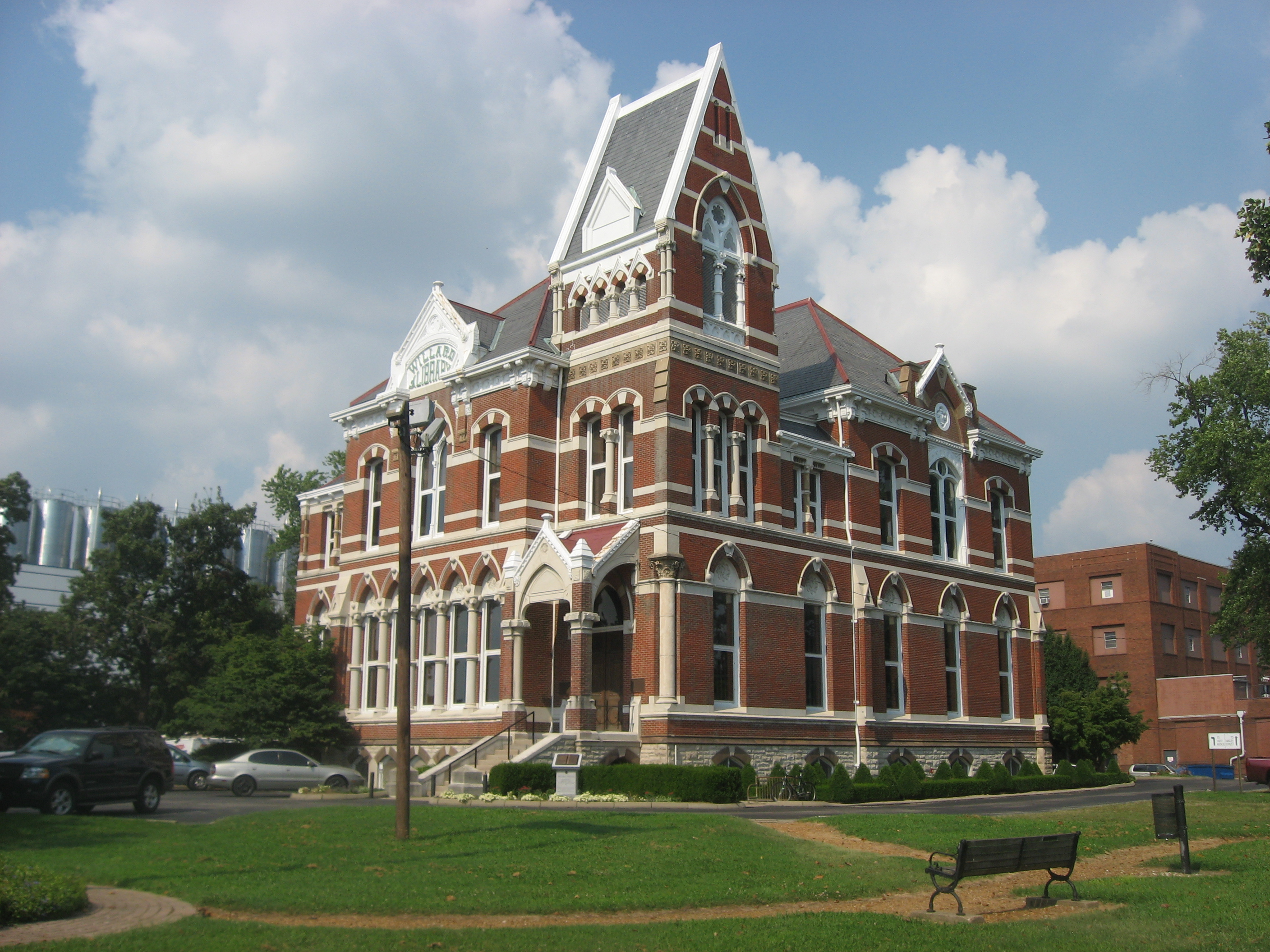
The Willard Library in Evansville, Indiana, designed by James Reid in 1881.

James William Reid (1851–1943) was a Canadian-born American architect of the noted San Francisco firm of Reid & Reid.

== Background ==
Born in Harvey, New Brunswick to William J. Reid and Lucinda Robinson, James W. Reid went on to graduate from the Massachusetts Institute of Technology (MIT), and also attended the École des Beaux-Arts in Paris. Reid and brother Merritt J. worked for a time at the architectural firm of Boyd and Brickley in Evansville, Indiana before purchasing the contracts of that firm in 1879 and opening their own practice, Reid Brothers.

== Reid Brothers ==
His most notable work in Evansville was the Willard Library, completed in 1885, which was added to the National Register of Historic Places in 1972. Earlier buildings designed by the Reid Brothers firm had been commissioned by banker Aaron Guard Cloud in McLeansboro, Illinois, 60 miles from Evansville. One was a bank, the Cloud State Bank building, which was designed in classic Second Empire French Baroque style; the other was a private home for the banker, which later became the McCoy Memorial Library in 1921 after having been endowed to the city by Cloud's daughter, Mary Ellen McCoy. Both of these buildings were added to the National Register of Historic Places in 1978.

E. S. Babcock, one of the founders of the Coronado Beach Company, was a retired railroad executive from Evansville, Indiana, and had known the brothers there. The Reid Brothers were invited out to San Diego in 1886 to design the Hotel Del Coronado, though Merritt remained behind in Evansville for a time, and their younger brother Watson Elkinah Reid joined James in San Diego to help manage the more than 2,000 mostly Chinese laborers that worked on the project. The 399-room hotel, also known as The Del, first opened in February, 1888. Upon its opening, The Del was the largest hotel resort in the world, was the first hotel to have electric lighting with 2,500 Mather incandescent electric lamps. The hotel was named a National Historic Landmark in 1977.

== Reid & Reid ==
John D. Spreckels became an investor in the hotel, originally lending $100,000 that was required to complete the hotel, and ultimately became the owner of the property by 1890, with the Spreckels family maintaining ownership until 1948. Spreckels and the Reids became known to each other during the construction of the hotel, and this connection led to James and Merritt moving to San Francisco in 1889, the same year they were both made Fellows of the American Institute of Architects, with Watson remaining in San Diego to manage activities there. (Watson would return to New Brunswick in 1899 and have no further involvement in the firm's activities.)

In 1892, the Reid Brothers designed the first steel-frame building west of Chicago for the Portland Oregonian newspaper, The Oregonian Building, which at 194 feet high became the city's tallest building. In 1894, they designed a connected group of six houses for Mrs. M. L. Selfridge, their first residential project, on the southwest corner of California and Pierce.

In 1895, Spreckels, who had become owner of the San Francisco Call, hired the Reid Brothers to build a new headquarters for his newspaper. The 315 ft. high steel-frame Call Building was, when it was completed in 1897, the tallest building west of Chicago. The Call Building dominated the City's skyline and became the most recognizable San Francisco landmark, with many calling it "the most beautiful building in the world", and was featured in many postcards of the day. The building interior burned in the fire following the April 18, 1906 earthquake, but the steel structure survived intact.

At the time of the 1906 San Francisco Earthquake, James was included in the "Committee of Fifty" that was called into existence by Mayor Eugene Schmitz to manage the crisis during the disaster, and was actively involved in the city's post-earthquake restoration.

The Reids designed many buildings during San Francisco's "City Beautiful" period, including the Fairmont Hotel (1906), the Geneva Car Barn Office Building (1899), the First Congregational Church (1914), the 3rd generation Cliff House (1909), the Hale Brothers Department Store (1912), and the Music Stand in Golden Gate Park, and also a number of theaters including the Coliseum (1918), the Alexandria (1923), the Metropolitan (1924) and the Balboa (1926). They also designed other landmark buildings in the region, including Oakland's Grand Lake Theatre (1926), Monterey's Golden State Theatre (1926) and Redwood City's New Sequoia Theater Building among many others.

== Personal ==
James retired in 1932 after Merritt's death, and then focused on his hobbies, including music (James was a founder of the San Francisco Opera) and oil painting. James died on September 22, 1943, in his apartment at 1100 Union Street, a cooperative apartment building that he had designed in 1929.
