= List of people from Albert County, New Brunswick =

List of notable people from Albert County, New Brunswick. Although not everyone in this list was born in Albert County, they all live or have lived in Albert County and have had significant connections to the communities.

This article does not include people from Riverview, as they have their own section.

Full name	Community	Famous for	Birth	Death	Other
R. B. Bennett	Hopewell Hill	politics	1870	1947	lawyer, businessman, politician, philanthropist, prime minister
W. A. C. Bennett	Hastings	politics	1900	1979	25th and longest-serving Premier of British Columbia
Harlan Carey Brewster	Harvey	politics	1870	1918	18th Premier of British Columbia
John Coleman Calhoun	Harvey	politics	1871	1950	Active in Alberta
A. Russell Colpitts	Colpitts Settlement	politics	1906	2008	
Fred Colpitts	Colpitts Settlement	politics; business	1887	1963	Fur farmer; breeder of silver fox
Harry O. Downey	Curryville	politics	1897	1974	
Roscoe Fillmore	Albert, Albert County	horticulture; politics	1887	1968	Political radical
Molly Kool	Alma	sea captain	1916	2009	First female master mariner in North America
William James Lewis	Hillsborough	politics	1830	1910	
Malcolm MacLeod		politics			
Abner Reid McClelan	Riverside-Albert	politics	1831	1917	lieutenant-governor
Hugh McMonagle	Hillsborough	politics	1817	1889	
Neil McNeil	Hillsborough	religion	1851	1934	Archbishop of Vancouver; Archbishop of Toronto
Charles J. Osman	Hillsborough	politics	1851	1922	
George Robert Parkin	Parkindale	education	1846	1922	Headmaster of Upper Canada College
Cyrus Wesley Peck	Hopewell Hill	military	1871	1956	Victoria Cross recipient
Freddie Prosser	Shenstone	wrestling	1938	1974	
James W. Reid	Harvey	architect	1851	1943	Noted for Hotel Del Coronado
Watson Elkinah Reid	Harvey	architect	1858	1944	Worked with his brother James in California
Wayne Steeves	Lower Coverdale	politics	1944		
William Steeves	Hillsborough	politics	1814	1873	Father of Confederation
Claude D. Taylor	Edgetts Landing	politics	1911	1970	
Harold A. Terris		politics		2001	
Gaius S. Turner	Harvey	politics	1838	1892	Shipbuilder
John D. Wallace		politics	1949		

== See also ==
- List of people from New Brunswick
