= Grein =

Grein may refer to:

== People ==
- Alice Augusta Grein née Graveen (1874−1944), English actress, playwright and theatre producer, wife of Jakob
- Jakob Thomas Grein (1862–1935), Dutch theatre impresario and drama critic, husband of Alice
- Richard Frank Grein (1932−2024), American Episcopal clergyman

== Places ==
- Grein, Austria, municipality in Perg, Upper Austria, Austria
- Grein Building, demolished building in Evansville, Indiana, United States of America
- Stadttheater Grein, theatre in Grein, Austria
