= Aaron G. Cloud House =

Historic house in Illinois, United States

- U.S. National Register of Historic Places
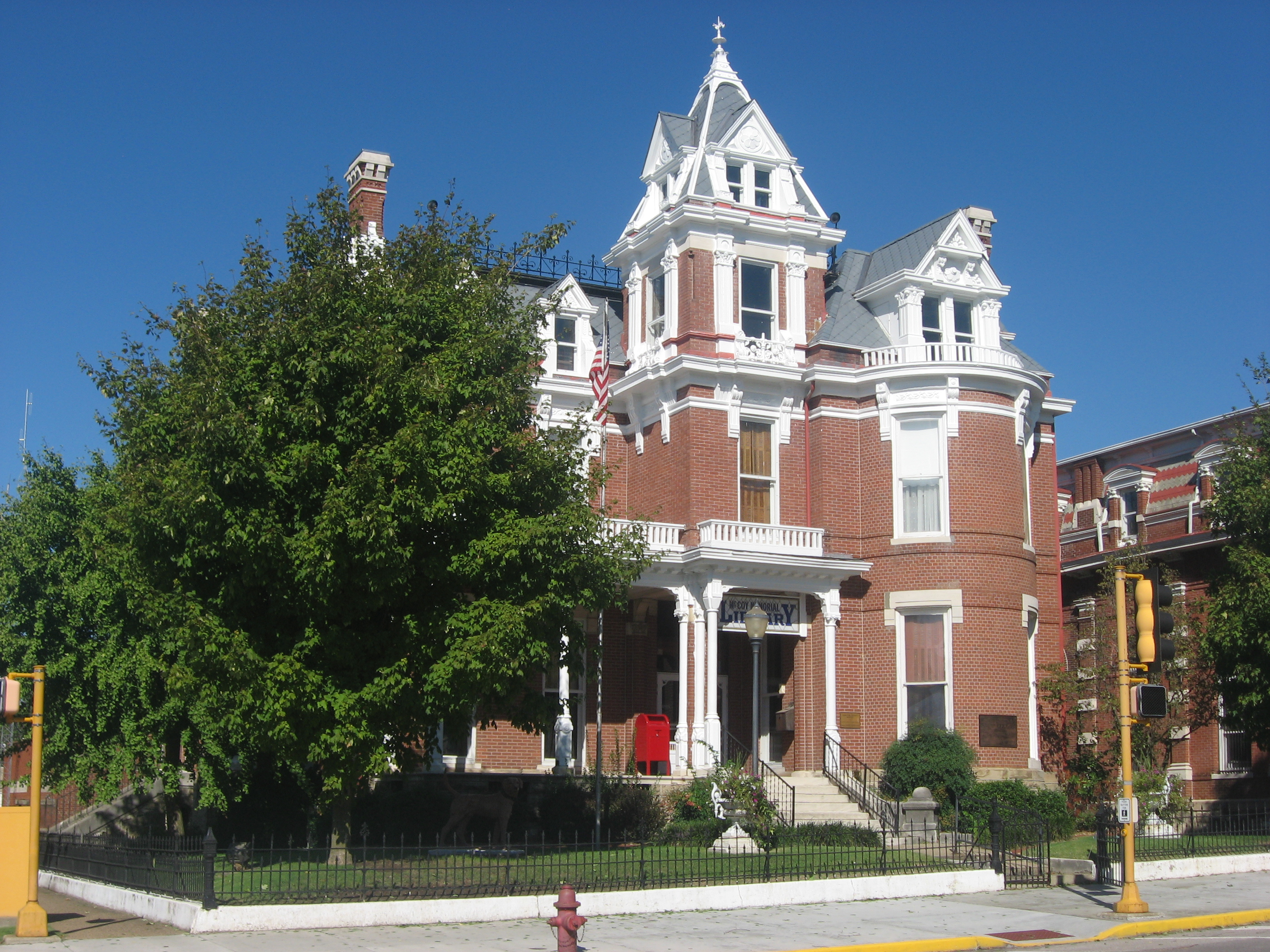
- Front of the house

- Location within Illinois Location within the United States
- Interactive map showing the location for Aaron G. Cloud House
- Location: 164 S. Washington St., McLeansboro, Illinois
- Coordinates: 38°5′35″N 88°32′10″W
- Built: 1884
- Architect: Reid Bros.
- Architectural style: Italianate
- NRHP reference No.: 78001150
- Added to NRHP: April 15, 1978

The Aaron G. Cloud House, now the McCoy Memorial Library, is a historic house in McLeansboro, Illinois, which is now used as the city's public library. The house was built in 1884 for Aaron G. Cloud, the founder of the Cloud State Bank; it has served as a library since 1922. The Reid Brothers, an architectural firm from Evansville, Indiana, designed the home. The red brick house features a central tower with a pyramidal roof atop the front entrance, a semicircular bay on the front facade, and an entrance porch spanning three bays of the building. The house includes Eastlake Style ornamentation throughout its design. The house includes nine interior fireplaces; the four fireplaces on the first floor are surrounded by decorative wood and tiles.

The home was added to the National Register of Historic Places on April 15, 1978.
