= Golden State Theatre =

Movie theater in Monterey, California, United States

- State Theatre
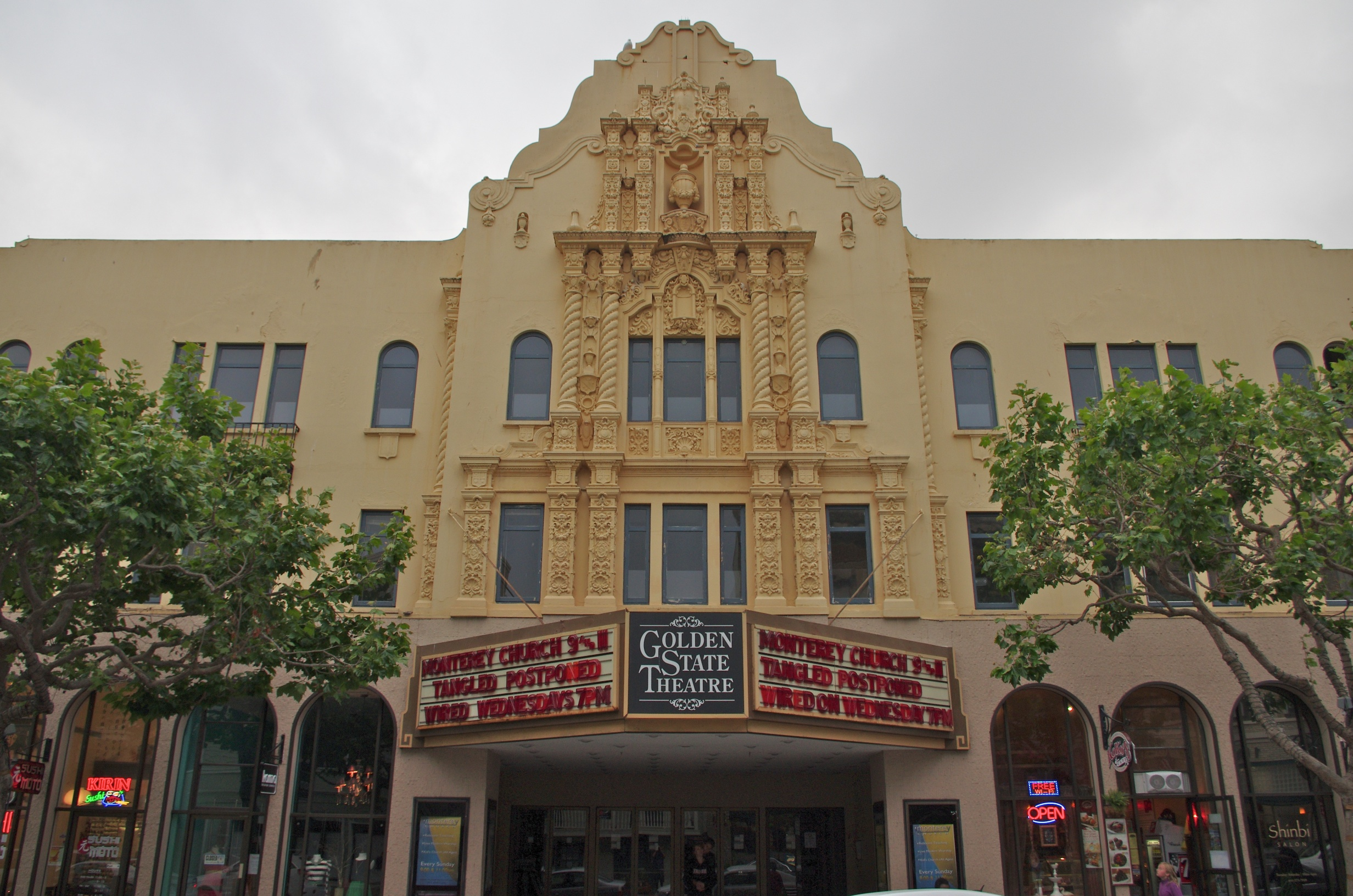
- Interactive map of Golden State Theatre
- Address: 417 Alvarado Street
- Location: Monterey, California, United States
- Coordinates: 36°35′58″N 121°53′38.1″W
- Seating type: Orchestra, balcony
- Capacity: 1,300 (1,600 original)
- Type: Indoor theater

Construction
- Built: 1926
- Opened: August 6, 1926
- Renovated: 2005 (partial)
- Architect: Reid & Reid

Website
- www.goldenstatetheatre.com

The Golden State Theatre in Monterey, California, United States, opened on August 6, 1926.

== Architecture ==
Designed by the noted San Francisco architectural firm of Reid & Reid, the Golden State Theatre is a "budget" atmospheric movie palace.

The theatre's architecture follows a Californian Churrigueresque style. Among the features included in the original design are wrought iron chandeliers, tapestries, gold ornamentation, and heraldic shields. The auditorium was designed to give the impression of an outdoor courtyard, a relatively rare feature among California theatres.

The interior features walls are inspired by a Castilian castle, and the ceiling has a fresco of a "canopy" with slight borders of "sky" showing around the perimeter. This gives the feeling of sitting in an open-air courtyard. The theater was originally equipped with lighting to simulate sunrises and sunsets.

The theater originally had 1,600 seats at a time when the population of Monterey was just around 6,000. For a long time the Golden State Theatre was the largest theater between San Francisco and Los Angeles.

In addition to the theater, the building has a number of leasable commercial spaces. Four storefronts face Alvarado Street and one larger space faces Tyler Street at the rear of the building. Historically there was also a small medical office in the second floor of the building, above and to the left of the marquee.

Previously run by the Naify Brothers, it later became part of United Artists Theatres. As with many movie palaces during the 1960s and 1970s, the theater fell on difficult financial times. In 1976 the main auditorium was split into a three screen multiplex, leaving the main screen intact while splitting the upper balcony into two smaller side-by-side screens.

== Restoration efforts ==
In 1990, State Theatre Preservation Group was formed as a public-benefit (non-profit) corporation to acquire and restore the building.

A replacement Wurlitzer pipe organ was installed beginning in 1992. The organ is the "twin" of the organ originally installed in the Golden State when the theater opened in 1926.

The theater was acquired by a private investor in 2005. An incomplete restoration was undertaken by the new owner beginning the same year. The partial restoration included returning the theater back to a single auditorium with one screen. New seating was installed (and reduced to 1,300) and a general cleanup of never completed spaces in the second and third floors of the building was also undertaken.

Shortly after the partial restoration, the building was leased to a church for a few years, after which it reverted to theatrical booking. Beginning in February 2019 an ongoing exhibit hosted at the theatre called "Selfieville" attracted paying customers interested in taking self-portrait photos (selfies) in front of unusual and colorful backgrounds. Selfieville is no longer open, with no indications when, or if, it might be revived.

== Ownership changes ==
In the autumn of 2013, the City of Monterey began investigating a public-private partnership with the current owner or an outright purchase by the city.

In March 2014, private investors Eric Lochtefeld and Lori Lochtefeld made an offer to purchase the theater with the intent to operate it as a performing arts venue. The Lochtefelds, who were the owners of the Fox Theatre in Redwood City until 2019, took over the Golden State Theatre's lease April 1, 2014. Escrow closed on August 30, 2014.

The COVID-19 epidemic that began in early 2020 caused a massive disruption in many parts of the worldwide economy. Theatres of all kinds, including the Golden State, suffered a drastic loss of revenues during enforced shutdowns that were implemented to limit the spread of the virus. In June 2021 the shutdowns in California were lifted, allowing theatres to re-open. The Lochtefelds sold the theatre later that month for $4.5 million to the general manager of The Catalyst, a nightclub located in Santa Cruz.

As of August 2021 the Golden State Theatre had a mix of musical and comedic acts scheduled, following a pattern of recent years where among the live performers on stage were comedians Jerry Seinfeld, Jay Leno and Ray Romano, as well as musical acts including Clint Black, David Crosby, and Chris Isaak.
