= Reid & Reid =

American architectural firm

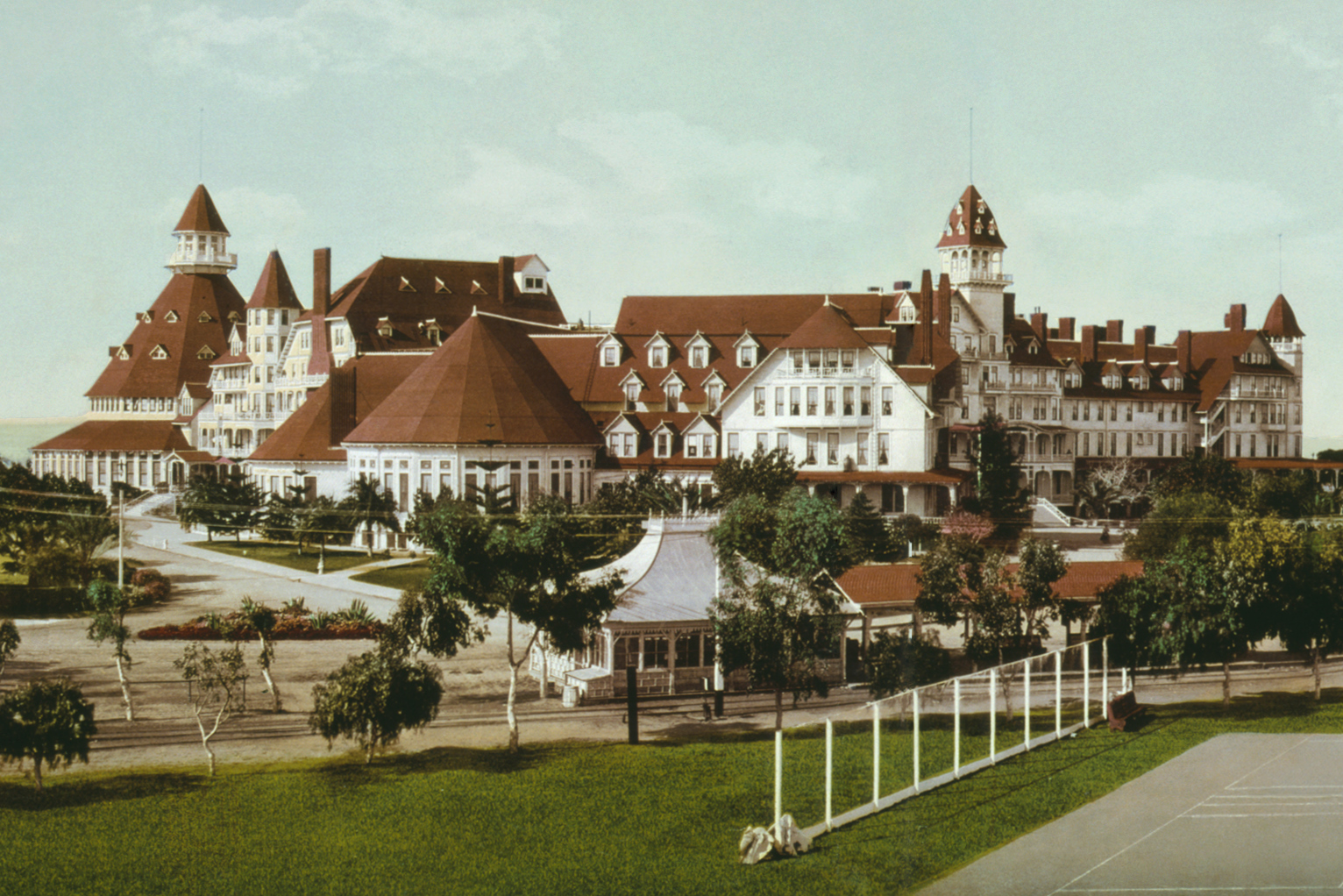
- Hotel del Coronado in San Diego, California

Practice information
- Partners: Watson Elkinah Reid; William Sterling Hebbard
- Founders: James W. Reid; Merritt J. Reid
- Founded: 1879
- Dissolved: 1932
- Location: San Francisco; San Diego; Evansville, Indiana
- Affiliations: Reid Brothers

Significant works and honors
- Buildings: Willard Library; Hotel del Coronado; The Call Building; Fairmont San Francisco; Cliff House

Reid & Reid, also known as Reid Brothers, was an American architectural and engineering firm that was active from 1880 to 1932. Established in Indiana by Canadian immigrants, the firm moved to the West Coast and became was the most prominent firm in San Francisco, California, in the late 19th and early 20th centuries.

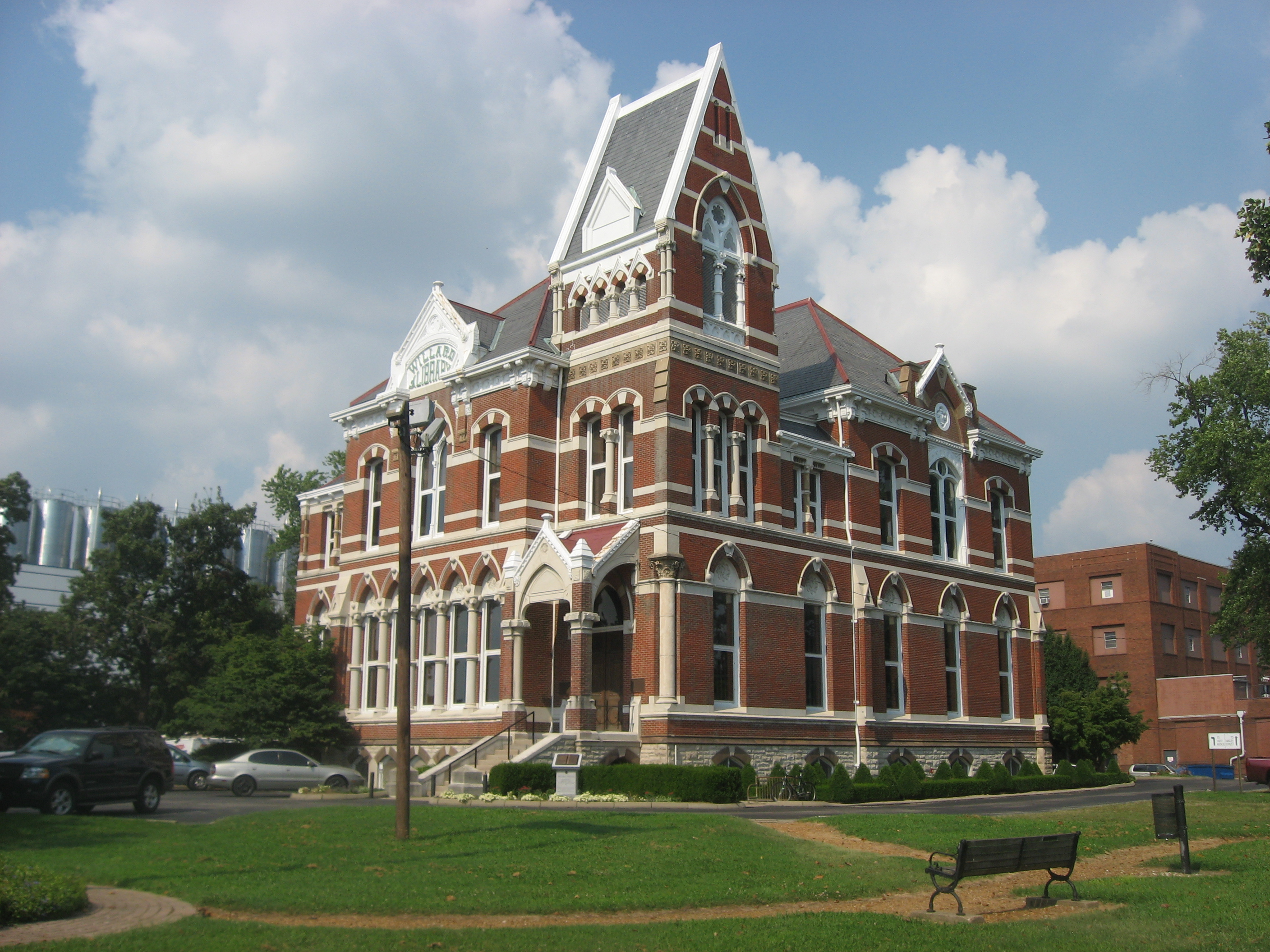
Willard Library

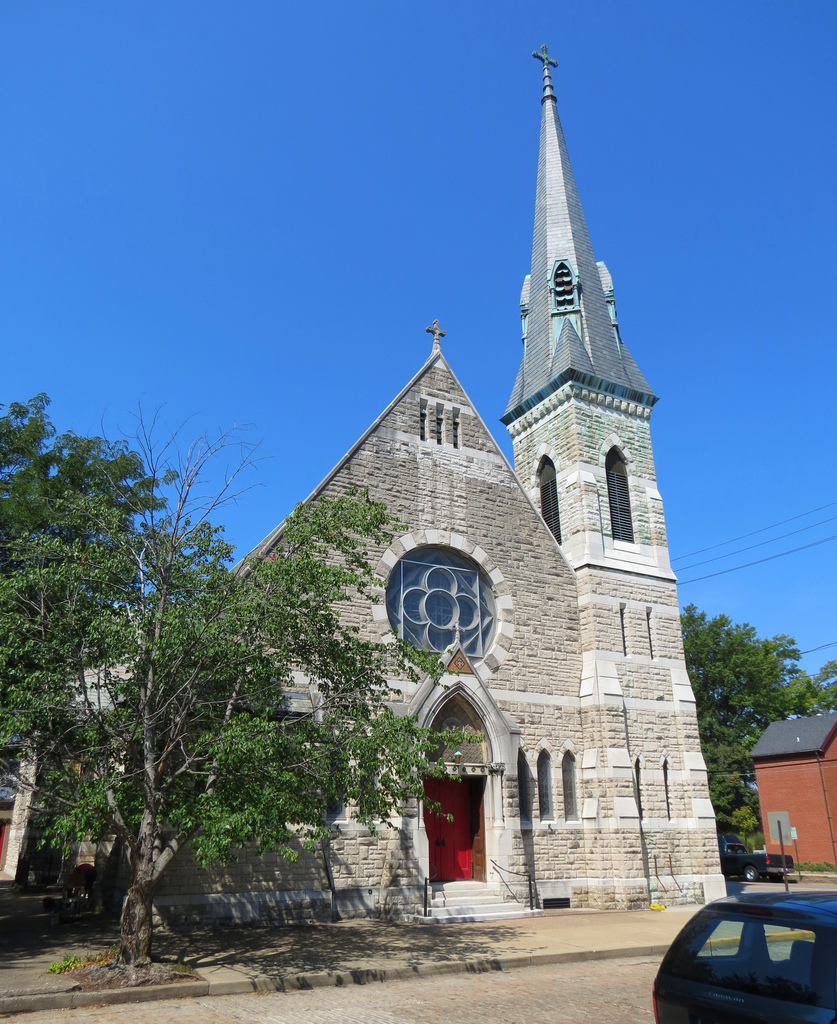
St. Paul's Episcopal Church

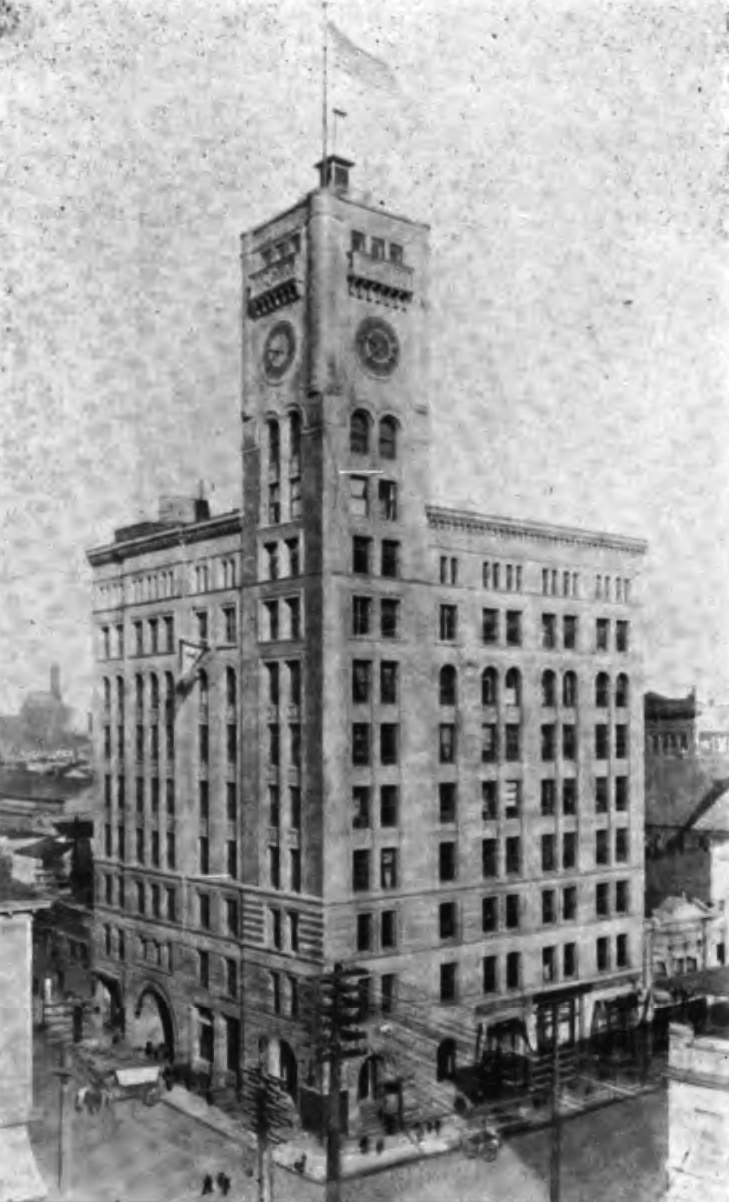
The Oregonian Building

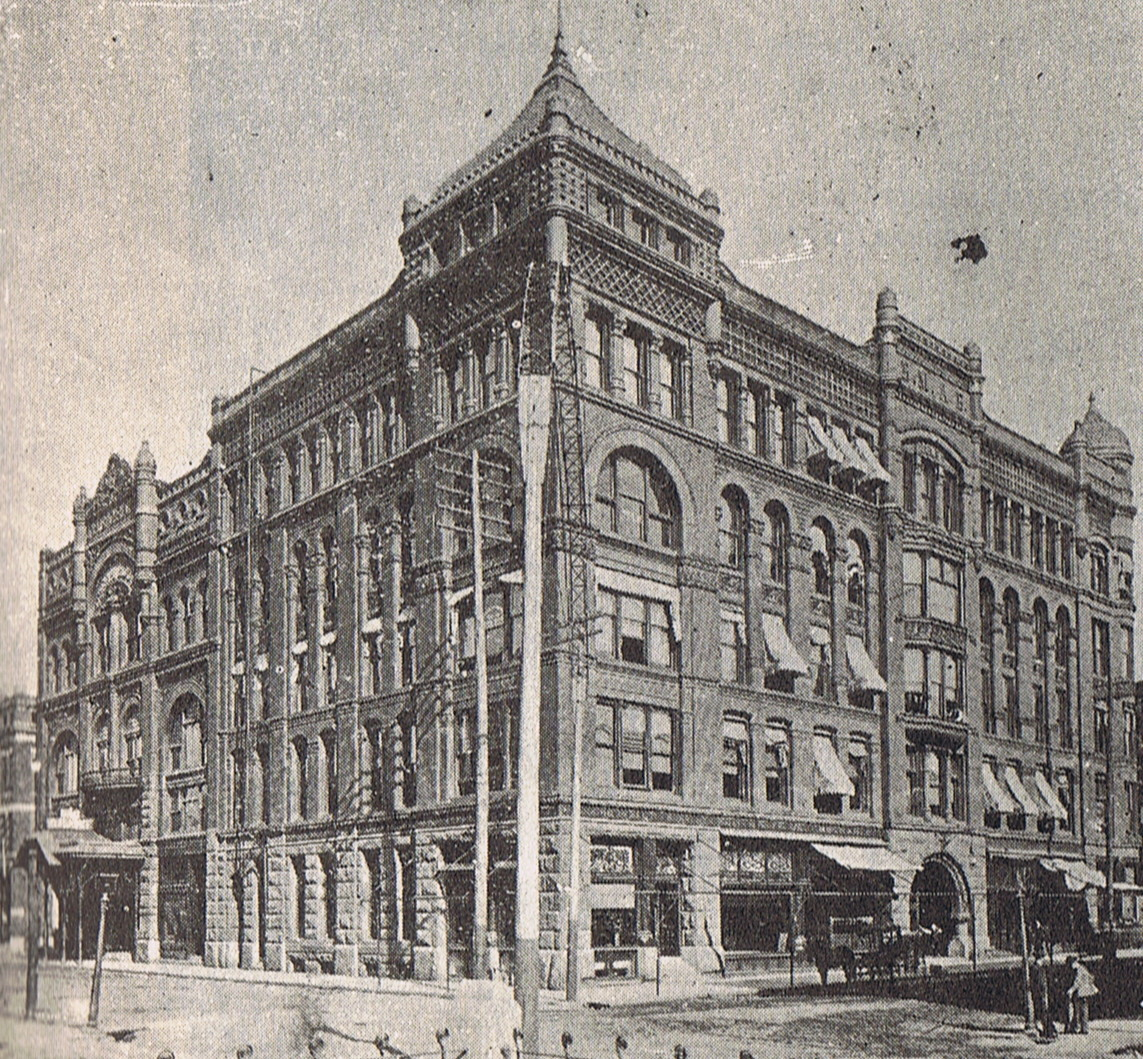
Grein Building circa1895

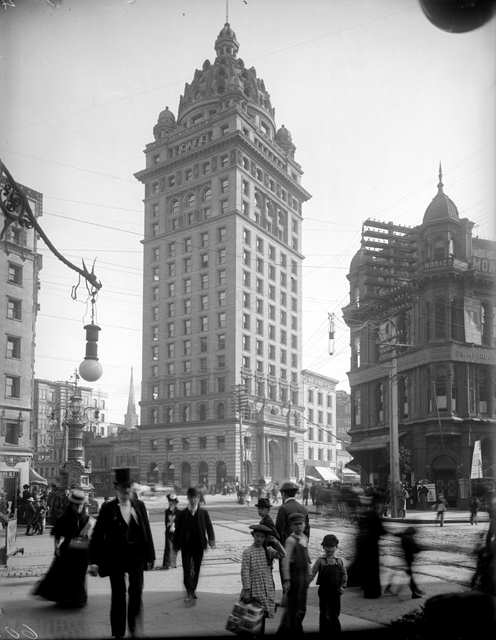
Call building before 1938 redesign

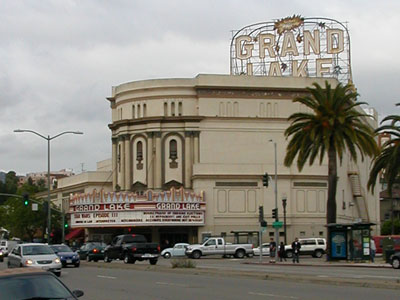
Grand Lake Theater

== History ==
Brothers James William Reid (1851–1943), Merritt Jonathan Reid (1855–1932), and Watson Elkinah Reid (1858–1944) were born in Harvey, Albert County, New Brunswick, Canada, three of the eight children of Lucinda Robinson and William James Reid, a farmer and house joiner. James worked as a house joiner and studied industrial arts at the Lowell School of Practical Design in Boston before attending McGill University in Montreal and the Massachusetts Institute of Technology. He also studied at the Ecole des Beaux-Arts in Paris 1874.

Before graduating from the Massachusetts Institute of Technology and École des Beaux-Arts in Paris. Merritt also graduated from École des Beaux-Arts.

In the late 19th–century, James and Merritt immigrated to Evansville, Indiana from and worked at the architectural firm of Boyd and Brickley. In 1879, they purchased the contracts from Boyd & Brickley and opened Reid Brothers.

One of their early clients was the Terre Haute Railroad which helped develop their reputation. Their most notable work in Evansville is the Willard Library which was executed in the Gothic revival style. Banker Aaron Guard Cloud commissioned two projects with the Reid Brothers: the Cloud State Bank in the Second Empire and French Baroque style and his private home which are both in McLeansboro, Illinois.

In 1886, the brothers moved to the San Diego, California with the client Charles T. Hinde to design Hotel Del Coronado for the Coronado Beach Company. Although the Coronado Beach Company was not financially successful, the project helped build the West Coast reputation of the Reid Brothers. Their younger brother, Watson Elkinah Reid moved to California and joined the firm around 1888. Watson attended Mount Allison University in Sackville, New Brunswick, Canada and worked as a house joiner. He served as the supervising architect for Hotel Del Coronado.

James and Merritt became Fellows of the American Institute of Architects in 1889. That same year, Merritt moved to San Francisco to open an office, followed shortly by James. Watson remained in San Diego to run that office. In 1891, Watson was joined by William Sterling Hebbard, an architect who had trained in Chicago.

In 1892, the Reid Brothers were hired to design the Portland, Oregon newspaper's Oregonian Building. It was the first steel-frame building west of Chicago.

In 1894, Mrs. M. L. Selfridge hired the firm to design six houses on the corner of California and Pierce in San Francisco.

Newspaperman Claus Spreckels hired them to design a headquarters for The San Francisco Call in 1895. Architect Charles William Dickey joined the firm's San Francisco office from 1895 to 1896. He was from Oakland but had attended the Massachusetts Institute of Technology. They also hired draftsman John Walter Dolliver as a designer; draftsman Emile Schroeder Lemme, and architect Albert L. Farr.

Completed in 1897, the Call Building was the tallest building west of Chicago at 315 feet. The top of the Call Building was a four-story dome; there, the Reid Brothers established their new office on the eighteenth floor. The Call Building dominated the San Francisco skyline and became its "most recognizable" landmark. Spreckels continued to work with Reid & Reid for other projects including the Spreckels Car House, several family mansions, and Spreckels Temple of Music, a music stand that Spreckels donated to Golden Gate Park.

In 1892, Watson Reid left the firm and moved back to New Brunswick. Watson Reid was commissioned to build what's known as Victoria Manor, completed in 1893 for Lt. Gov. Abner Reid McClellan. Hebbard then became head of the San Diego office and oversaw its work.

In addition to the Spreckels Temple of Music, Reid & Reid designed the Caretaker's Cottage at Golden Gate Park. In 1908, they also designed a Stadium at the Polo Fields for Golden Gate Park, but the project ended early in the construction phase. Only a small section of the bleachers was constructed.

Reid & Reid was hired to design the Fairmont Hotel on Nob Hill in 1902. Although damaged by the 1906 San Francisco earthquake, the hotel opened a year later, on April 18, 1907. They also designed the First Congregational Church, the W. & J. Sloane Building, and two Hale Brothers Co. department stores. They also created the third version of Cliff House.

They also designed many mansions in the Pacific Heights, although many were lost in the 1906 San Francisco earthquake and fire. Two surviving houses located at 2083 and 2099 Pacific were built for Spreckels as wedding gifts for his son. Those survive today, along with 1919 Sacramento, 2770 Broadway, and 2646 Vallejo. Another residential project was the Classical Revival Irwin mansion which was located at 2190 Washington.

Reid & Reid designed numerous movie theaters in San Francisco, including the Alexandria Theatre, the Balboa Theatre, the Coliseum Theatre, the Metropolitan, and the New Mission Theatre. They also designed the Golden State Theatre in Monterey, the Grand Lake Theater in Oakland, the New Sequoia Theater Building in Redwood City, and Sequoia Theatre in Mill Valley, California

In 1929, they designed a 20-unit cooperative apartment building in Russian Hill. James moved into the apartment building, living there until he died in 1943.

When Merritt died on February 4, 1932, James retired and closed the firm.

== Selected works ==
Building	Date	Place	Reference
Willard Library	1877	Evansville, Indiana	
Cloud State Bank	1880	McLeansboro, Illinois	
Aaron G. Cloud house	1884	McLeansboro, Illinois	
St. Paul's Episcopal Church	1886	Evansville, Indiana	
Hotel del Coronado	1888	San Diego, California	
Grein Building	1889	Evansville, Indiana	
Germond Block	1890	Spokane, Washington	
Oregonian Building	1892	Portland, Oregon	
Selfridge Houses, 2603 through 2611 California	1894	San Francisco, California	
Residence, 1919 Sacramento	1895	Pacific Heights, San Francisco, California	
The Call Building (now Central Tower)	1898	San Francisco, California	
Spreckels Car House (also known as Geneva Car Barn), 2301 San Jose	1899	San Francisco, California	
Spreckels Temple of Music, Golden Gate Park	1900	San Francisco, California	
Irwin Mansion, 2190 Washington	1901	San Francisco, California	
Hale Brothers Department Store, 989 Market	1902	San Francisco, California	
Residence, 2770 Broadway	1904	Pacific Heights, San Francisco, California	
Spreckels Mansion, 2083 Pacific	1904	Pacific Heights, San Francisco, California	
Spreckels Mansion, 2099 Pacific	1905	Pacific Heights, San Francisco, California	
Fairmont San Francisco	1907	San Francisco, California	
Merritt Building	1907	San Francisco, California	
1 Sixth Street	1908	San Francisco, California	
Garfield Building, 938–942 Market Street	1908	San Francisco, California	
W. & J. Sloane Furniture Building, 222 Sutter	1908	San Francisco, California	
222 Sutter Street	1909	San Francisco, California	
Marshall Hale House, 26 Presidio Terrace	1909	San Francisco, California	
Cliff House (third-generation building)	1909	San Francisco, California	
Yeon Building	1911	Portland, Oregon	
Hale Brothers Department Store expansion, 901 Market	1912	San Francisco, California	
The Oregon Journal Building (now Jackson Tower)	1912	Portland, Oregon	
First Congregational Church	1913	San Francisco, California	
1915 Merritt Building	1915	Los Angeles, California	
New Mission Theater	1916	San Francisco, California	
Residence, 2646 Vallejo	1917	Pacific Heights, San Francisco, California	
Coliseum Theatre, 745 Clement	1918	San Francisco, California	
Sweasey Theatre (now Arkley Center for the Performing Arts)	1920	Eureka, California	
United Building	1920	Los Angeles, California	
Orpheus Theatre	1920	San Rafael, California	
Grand Rapids Hotel	1922	Wabash County, Illinois	
Alexandria Theater, 5400 Geary	1923	San Francisco, California	
Fitzhugh Building	1923	San Francisco, California	
Metropolitan Theatre, 2055 Union	1924	San Francisco, California	
Roosevelt Theatre (now Brava Theatre Center)	1924	San Francisco, California	
New Balboa Theatre, 3630 Balboa	1926	San Francisco, California	
Golden State Theatre	1926	Monterey, California	
Grand Lake Theater	1926	Oakland, California	
Sequoia Theatre	1929	Mill Valley, California	
New Sequoia Theater Building	1929	Redwood City, California	
La Miranda Apartments, 1100 Union	1929	Russian Hill, San Francisco, California	
State Theater	1931	San Francisco, California	
Sebastiani Theatre	1934	Sonoma, California	
