= New Mission Theater (San Francisco) =

- U.S. National Register of Historic Places
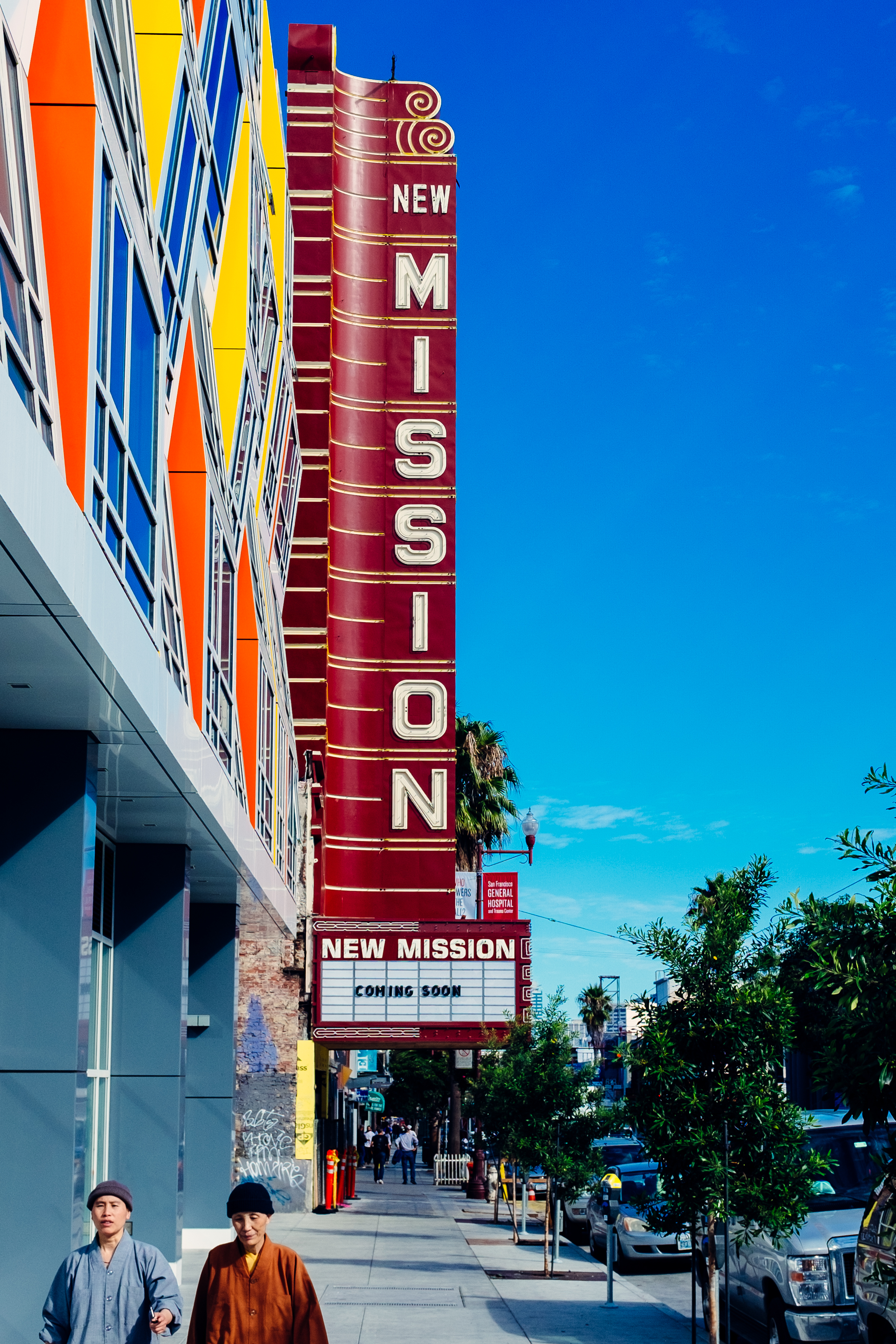

- Location within San Francisco County Location within California Location within the United States
- Location: 2550 Mission Street, San Francisco, California, U.S.
- Coordinates: 37.75622°N 122.41909°W
- Built: 1916
- Architect: Reid Brothers
- NRHP reference No.: 01001206
- Added to NRHP: November 9, 2001

San Francisco Designated Landmark
- Designated: May 27, 2004
- Reference no.: 245

The New Mission Theater is a historic building, built in 1916 and is located at 2550 Mission Street in San Francisco, California.

The building is listed as a San Francisco Designated Landmark since May 27, 2004; and listed as one of the National Register of Historic Places since November 9, 2001.

== History ==
The building originally designed by the Reid Brothers. It was renovated for the Nasser Brothers Theaters circuit in 1932 by Timothy Pflueger, who transformed it into Art Deco-style. It boasts a 70 foot (21 m) marquee sign that is a local landmark. In its early life, it showed mostly "B" movies.

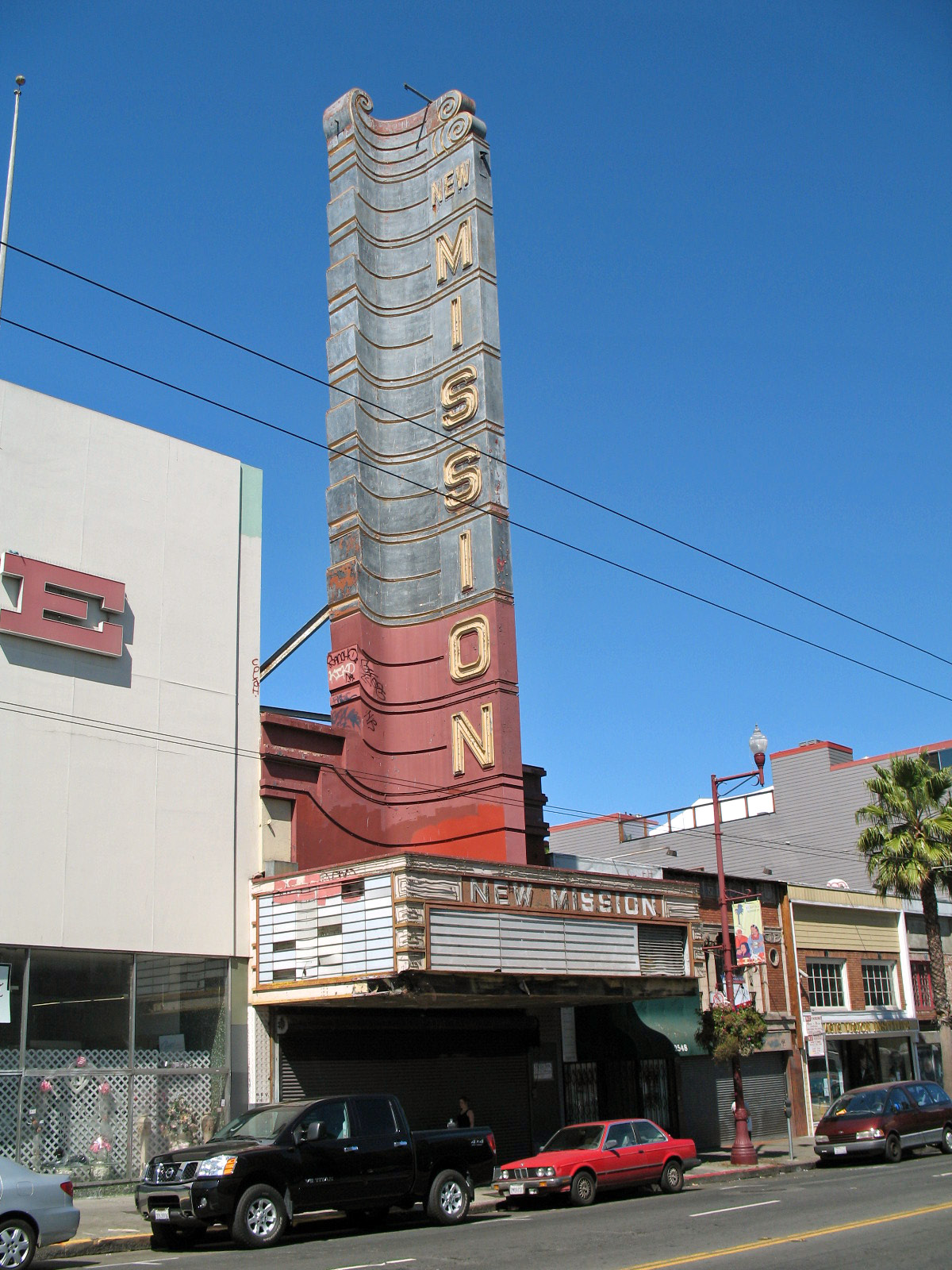
exterior in 2008

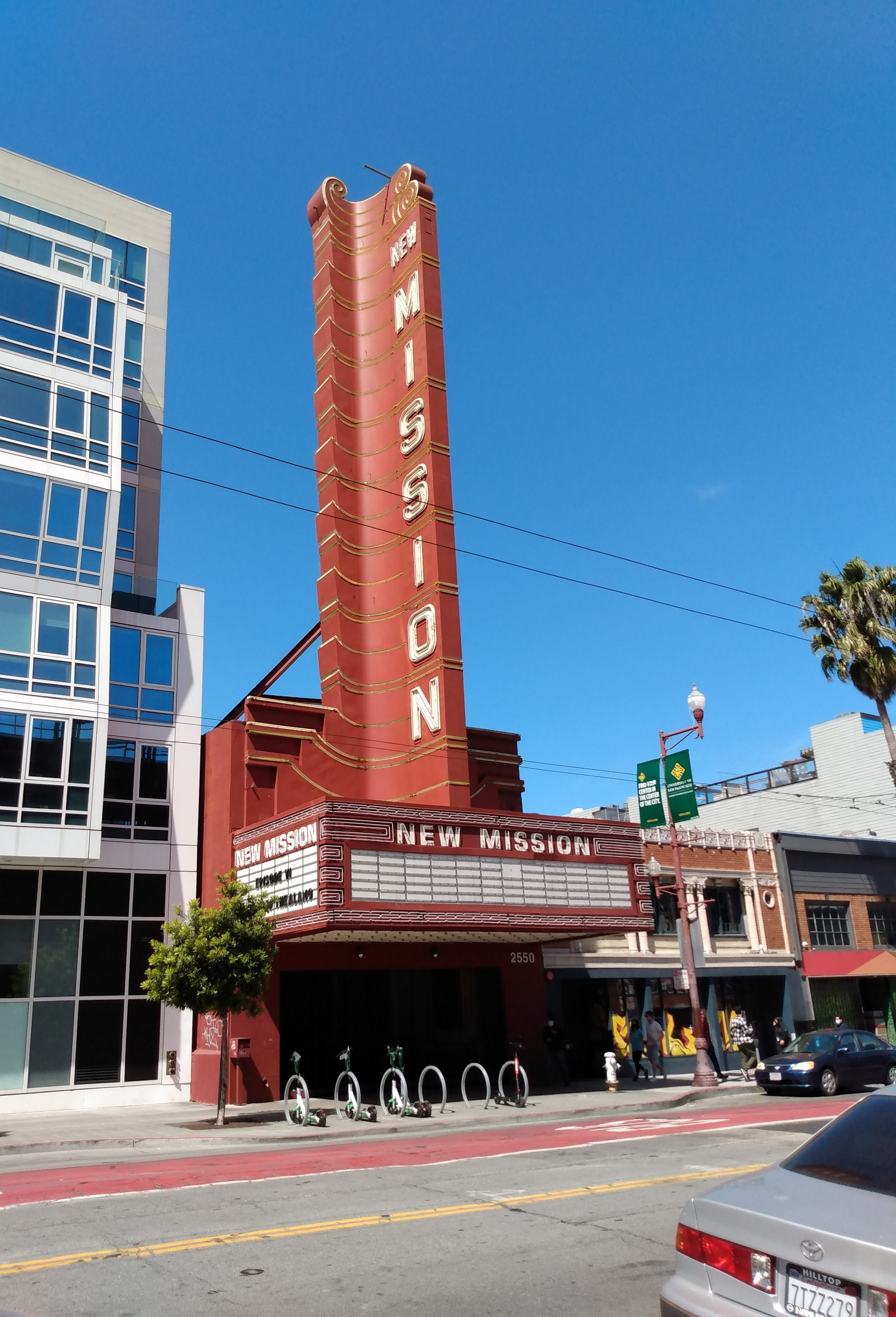
exterior in 2021 after renovations

In the 1960s and 1970s, it specialized in children's fare. The theater closed in 1993 and became a furniture store. It was purchased by the City College of San Francisco, who proposed to raze it and build new campus facilities. But a group called "Save The New Mission Theater", headed by Alfonso Felder, lobbied to stop the college from destroying the theater.

The building was renovated by the Alamo Drafthouse Cinema chain headquartered in Austin, Texas; it re-opened as a movie theater, restaurant, and bar in December 2015, and maintained the name New Mission Theater.

== See also ==
- List of San Francisco Designated Landmarks
- National Register of Historic Places listings in San Francisco
