= Oregonian Building =

The Oregonian Building
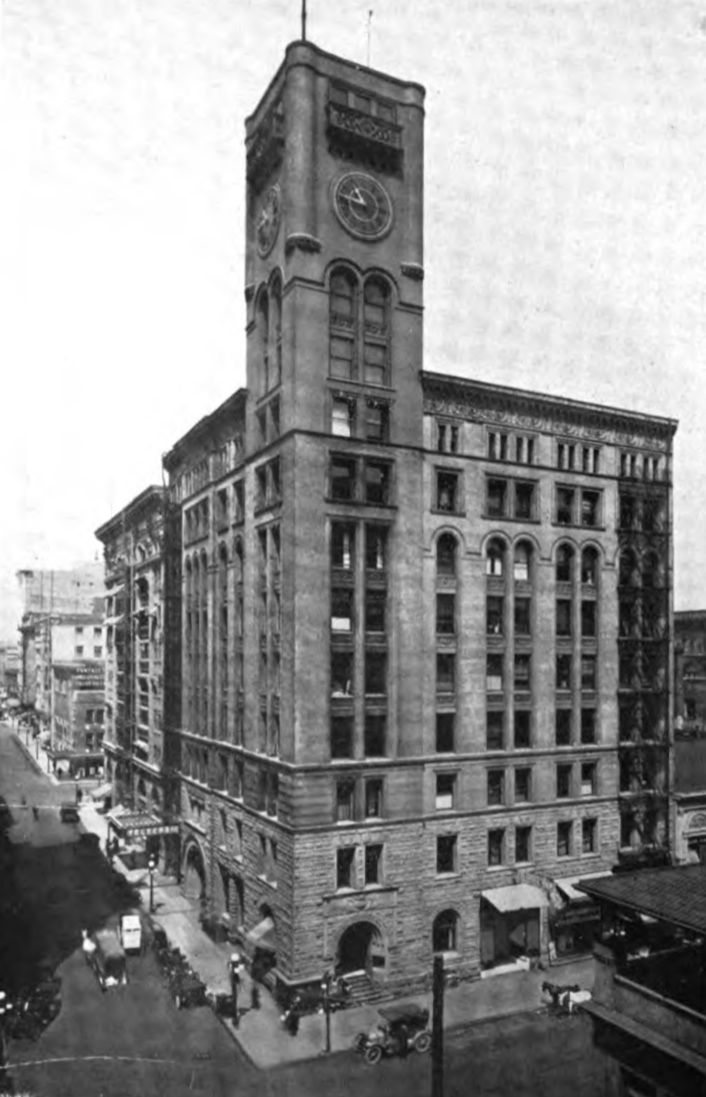
- The Oregonian Building circa 1912
- Interactive map of the The Oregonian Building area

General information
- Status: Demolished
- Type: Primarily office
- Architectural style: Romanesque Revival
- Location: 135 SW 6th St. (old system); 537 SW 6th Ave. (new system), Portland, Oregon, United States
- Coordinates: 45°31′12″N 122°40′42″W
- Opened: 1892
- Demolished: 1950
- Cost: $690,000 (equivalent to $24.7 million in 2025)
- Owner: The Oregonian Publishing Company

Height
- Height: 194 ft (59 m)

Technical details
- Material: Brick over steel frame
- Floor count: 13 (9 in main portion)
- Floor area: Approx. 100,000 ft^{2} (9,300 m^{2})
- Lifts/elevators: 2

Design and construction
- Architects: James W. Reid and Merritt J. Reid
- Architecture firm: Reid Brothers

The Oregonian Building was a building in downtown Portland, Oregon, United States, which served as the headquarters of Portland's major newspaper, The Oregonian, from 1892 to 1948. It was the first steel-framed building constructed in the Western U.S., and from its opening until 1911 it was the tallest building in Portland. In addition to the newspaper's offices and printing press, in 1922 the building became the home of Portland's first commercial radio station, KGW, which was owned by the Oregonian Publishing Company. A second radio station, KEX, was acquired by the paper in 1933, and joined KGW in new, shared studios in the Oregonian Building. A fire in 1943 forced the radio stations to relocate. The company sold the building in December 1947 as it prepared for a move to a larger building. In June 1948, the newspaper moved to a new building on Southwest Broadway, also called the Oregonian Building. The 1892 building with the landmark clock tower then stood vacant for about two years until it was demolished, in 1950.

== History and description ==
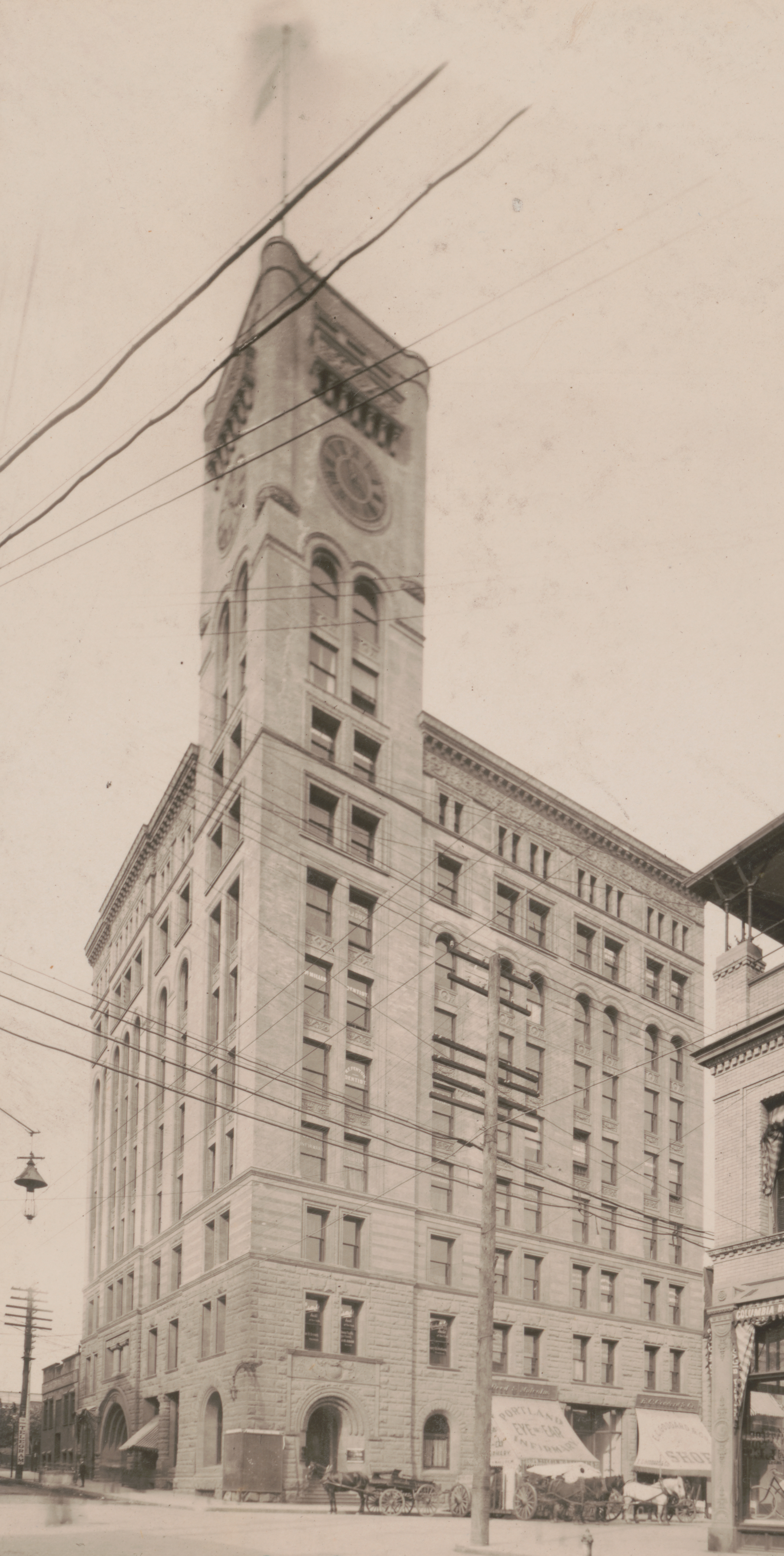
Oregonian Building circa 1899

The Oregonian began publication in 1850, and in 1878 its office and printing facilities moved to a then-new brick building at the intersection of Front and Stark streets. That building and its wooden predecessor were referred to as the Oregonian Building, during their periods as the newspaper's headquarters, and this pattern continued with successor buildings. In 1890, the Oregonian Publishing Company began construction of a much larger headquarters building, to accommodate the paper's continuing expansion. The new Oregonian Building was located at the intersection of Southwest Sixth and Alder streets, northwest corner. The building's nine-story main portion was 134 ft (41 m) high, but extending for another 60 feet above was a tower with a smaller floor area and a large clock (with faces on all four sides) above the 11th floor. The building's overall height of 194 ft (59 m) made it the tallest structure in Portland, a distinction it retained until the completion of the Yeon Building in 1911. It was "the first steel-framed skyscraper west of Chicago" when built. Its footprint was 100 by 100 feet (30 m × 30 m), and it contained roughly 100,000 square feet (9,300 m^{2}) of floor space, including the basement but not the tower.

The building was designed by James W. Reid and Merritt J. Reid, of the Reid Brothers firm. Otto Kleemann served as a consulting architect. The design was Romanesque Revival, with touches of Richardsonian Romanesque style. Above the clock was "an open belfry with balconies", where the bells for the clock were located. The clock was made by E. Howard & Co. and cost $1,845. The first two stories were surfaced in red sandstone (from Flagstaff, Arizona), and buff brick and terra cotta covered the stories above. The main entrance, on Alder Street, was finished in light-rose marble, and the interior made extensive use of Italian white marble on the first floor and main stairway.

The newspaper moved most of its staff into the new building in mid-January 1892, but with some departments using temporary locations within the building, as the interior was not finished until a few months later, and the last work on the uppermost floors was not completed until 1893. New, more modern printing presses, made by R. Hoe & Company, were installed in the building's basement, so there was no need to relocate the presses from the old location. After completion of the building, some of the space was made available for lease to other businesses. Tenants included a drug store, a shoe store, a tailor, an optical store and a barber shop, along with offices of professional firms such as the Equitable Life Assurance Company. When the building opened, its site was well west of the central business district, but within a few decades, expansion of downtown had shifted the center westwards.

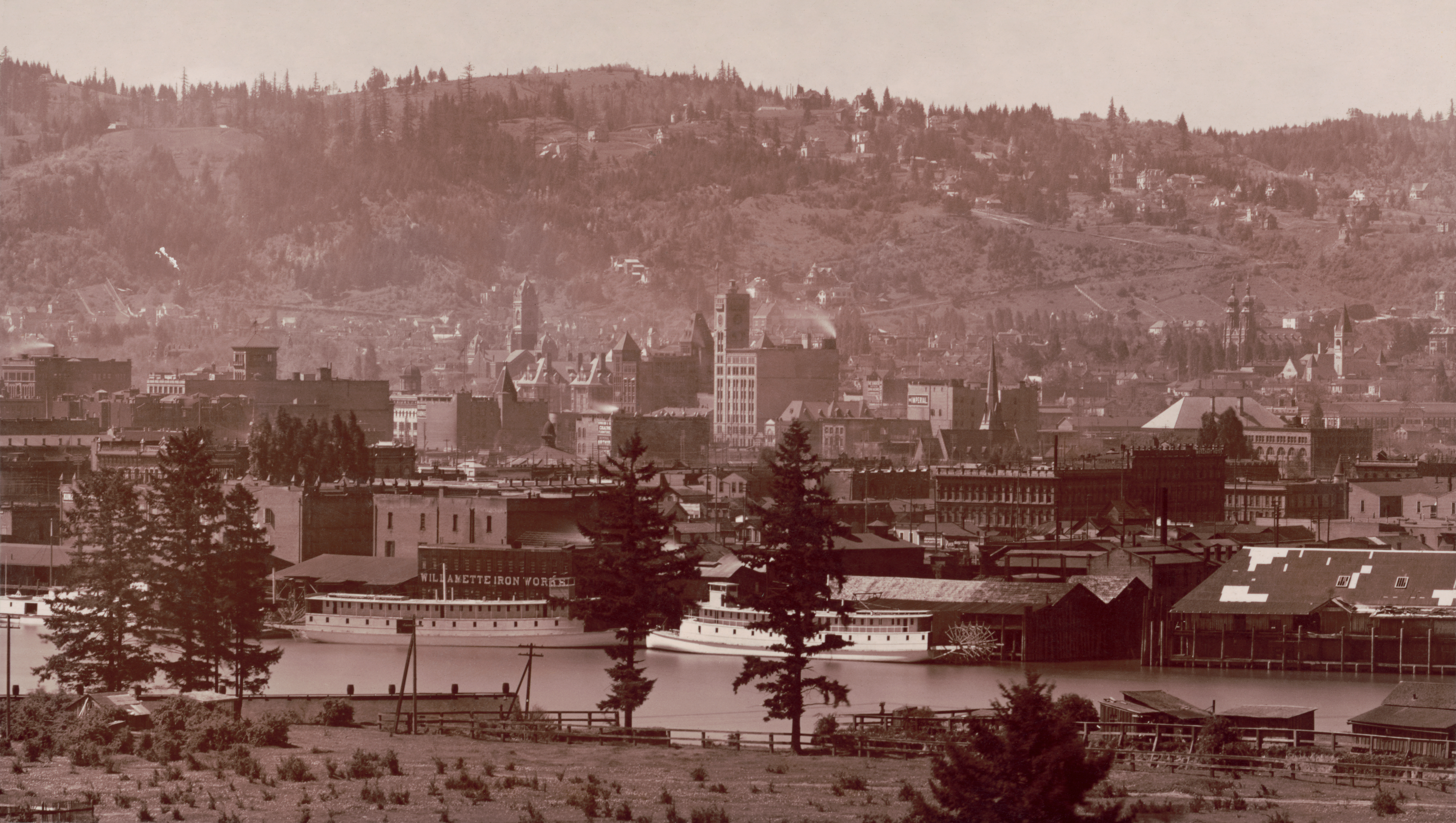
The downtown skyline in 1898, with the Oregonian Building in the center

From October 1892 until June 1902, the U.S. Department of Agriculture's official weather recording station for Portland was located in the Oregonian Building. The U.S. Weather Bureau was located in the building's tower, and was the first occupant of that portion of the Oregonian Building.

In addition to The Morning Oregonian newspaper, the Oregonian also owned the Evening Telegram, and that paper was published from the 1892 building until the company sold it in 1914 to Wheeler Brothers. The Oregonian Building lost its status as Portland's tallest building in 1911, when the 198-foot-tall (60 m) Yeon Building was completed.

A jewelry store, Jaeger Brothers, that had occupied a portion of the ground floor was displaced in the early 1920s when the newspaper needed room for a new three-story printing press made by Goss, which came into use in 1923. In 1930, a huge neon sign measuring 90 ft (27 m) tall by 11.5 ft (3.5 m) wide and reading "The Oregonian" was attached to the building, on the corner at Sixth and Alder streets. The sign's manufacturer, Electrical Products Corporation, of Los Angeles, expressed the belief that it was the largest of its kind in the U.S. at the time.

== KGW and KEX radio ==
In 1922, the Oregonian Publishing Company launched Portland's first commercial radio station to feature regular broadcasting, KGW (620 AM). It was the first newspaper on the West Coast to own and operate its own radio station. The broadcast studios were located on the 11th floor, in the building's tower, and the transmitter was on the 13th floor, above the large clock. The first test broadcast was made on March 23, 1922, and regular broadcasting began on March 25. Initially, the aerials were attached to the 60-foot flagpole atop the building's roof, but later the same year, the station upgraded its signal with larger, more powerful equipment. In October, an 86-foot-tall (26 m) antenna tower was erected atop the tower of the building, and a 98-foot-tall (30 m) tower was erected atop the nearby Northwestern National Bank Building, and KGW's antenna was attached to a cable connecting the two rooftop towers. In February 1926, KGW moved from the 11th floor into larger studios built on the 7th and 8th floors.

In 1933, the newspaper acquired radio station KEX and moved it to the Oregonian Building in 1934. At the time, it was the most powerful radio station in Oregon, broadcasting at 5,000 Watts. It moved into the 7th floor, sharing space with KGW. Both stations were affiliated with NBC at the time. The broadcast studios were destroyed in a fire in 1943. Both stations relocated to other buildings, except for the transmitter. They never returned to the old Oregonian Building, although in 1948 KGW, which was still owned by the paper at that time, did return to an Oregonian Building, as it was given studios in the then-new building – of the same name – that replaced the 1892 landmark.

== Vacation and demolition ==
In 1892, the newspaper's circulation was only 13,000 for the daily edition, 16,000 on Sundays, but by 1940 daily circulation had grown to 138,472 on weekdays and 167,210 on Sundays. The Oregonian had again outgrown its space, and the company began planning for a new building in 1944. As with the 1892 move, this relocation also afforded the opportunity to upgrade to a newer model of printing press, a higher-capacity one made by R. Hoe & Company.

The new Oregonian Building of 1948 was located seven blocks south of the old one, facing Southwest Broadway and filling an entire city block bounded by Broadway, Jefferson and Columbia Streets, and 6th Avenue. Twenty-two years earlier, the mansion home of prominent Portland businessman and former mayor William S. Ladd had occupied the site, until demolished in 1926. The newspaper staff moved to the new building in June 1948, and the new printing press was brought into use on June 7, 1948. There were 842 Oregonian employees working in the old building at the time of the move to the new quarters on Broadway. The old Oregonian Building's large clock was turned off on July 30, 1948, never to resume operation.

The building and land were sold in December 1947 for $800,000 (equivalent to $28.7 million in 2025), to a Los Angeles-based commercial investment and development company, Store Properties, Inc. However, after the newspaper and other tenants moved out, the building remained vacant, and in 1950 its new owners decided to raze it. Demolition took six months and was completed in November 1950. In 1951, a two-story retail-commercial building was constructed on the site.

The large clock in the tower was sold to an engineer who moved it to Oregon State College and used it as a teaching tool, but by the late 1950s the clock had returned to Portland and joined the collection of the Oregon Museum of Science and Industry. It was still in OMSI's collection in January 2019, but had recently (in December 2018) been removed from longtime display in the museum's Turbine Hall.

== See also ==
- List of tallest buildings in Portland, Oregon
