= Willard Library =

- U.S. National Register of Historic Places
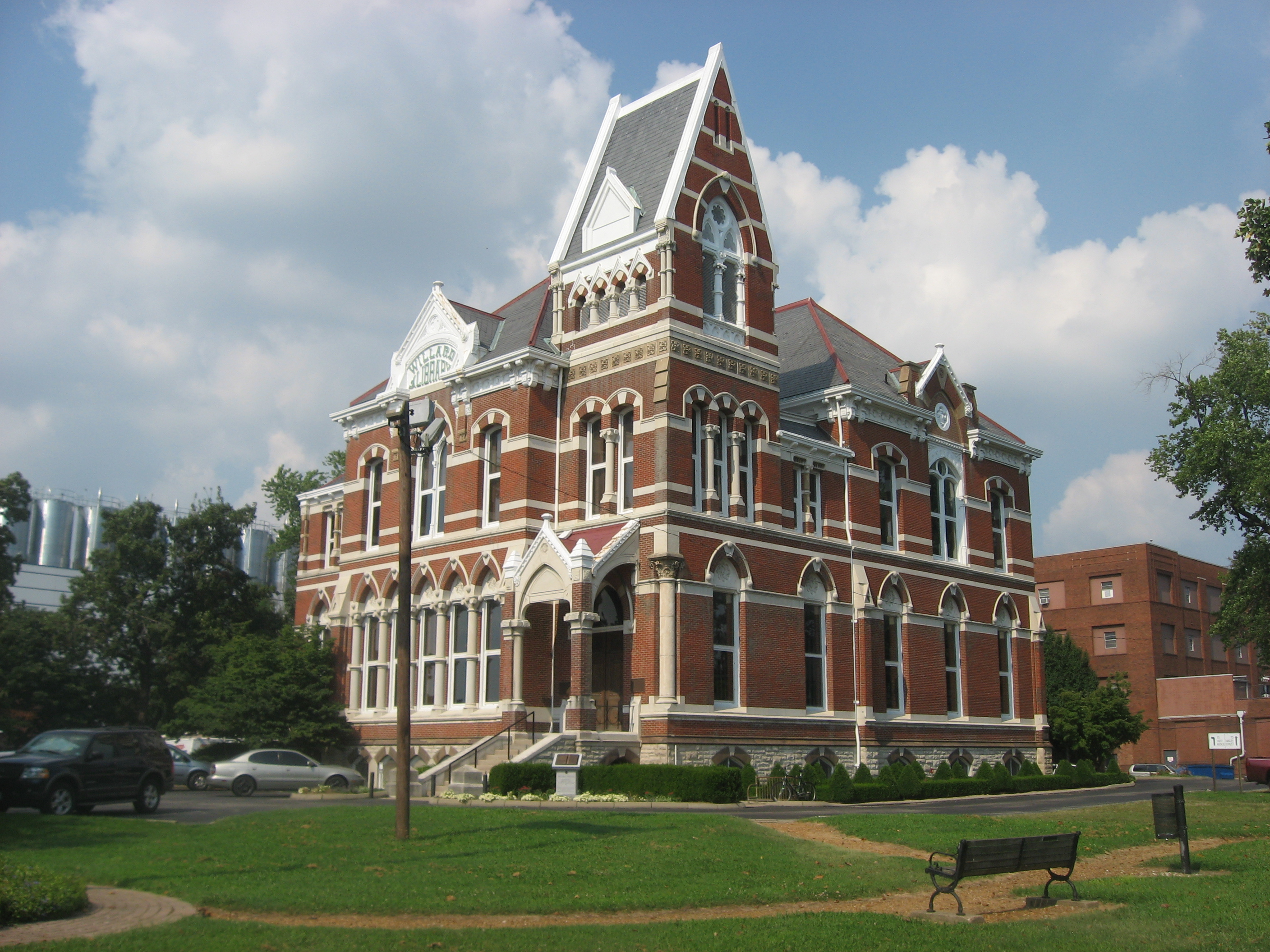
- Front and southern side of the library

- Location within Indiana Location within the United States
- Location: 21 1st Ave., Evansville, Indiana
- Coordinates: 37°58′42″N 87°34′27″W
- Area: 4.5 acres (1.8 ha)
- Built: 1877
- Architect: James W. Reid (Reid & Reid)
- Architectural style: Victorian Gothic
- NRHP reference No.: 72000014
- Added to NRHP: September 28, 1972

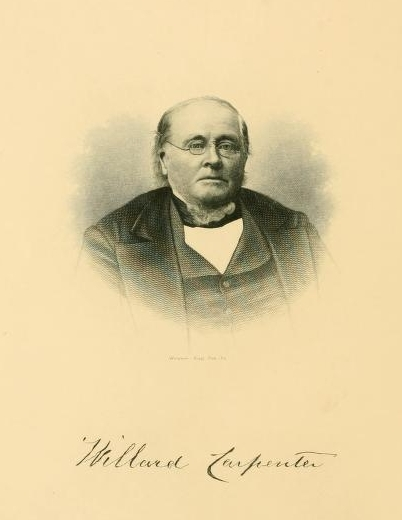
Philanthropist Willard Carpenter

The Willard Library is a public library incorporated in 1881 to serve the city of Evansville, Indiana. In addition to standard publications, Willard Library also stores local and genealogical archives. It is built in the Gothic Revival style, designed by James W. Reid (of Reid & Reid). It was listed on the National Register of Historic Places in 1972.

== History ==
Willard Carpenter built and endowed Willard Library. He established a trust fund in 1876, writing:

"I have concluded . . . to establish and endow a public library, to be located in a public park, on land owned by me, situated in the city of Evansville. I am induced to do this in well-grounded hope that such an institution may become useful toward the improvement of the moral and intellectual culture of the inhabitants of Evansville . . . and also toward the enlargement and diffusion of a taste for the fine arts."

== Architecture ==
The library was built in the Victorian Gothic style, with features including its steep roofs, turrets, and window arcades with Gothic arches.

== Genealogy and local history collections ==
Willard Library is home to a vast range of genealogy and local history special collections on their second floor. Opened in August 1976 the collections include: fifty state references, family histories in book, microform, manuscript, and loose-paper formats, Vanderburgh County newspapers from 1821 to the present, newspapers from selected surrounding counties, Vanderburgh County records (on microfilm), church records in several formats, Catholic Diocese records (on microfilm), records of local and area cemeteries and funeral homes, DAR book collection, and several online databases and three major search engines: Heritage Quest, Genealogy Bank, and Ancestry Library. The Library hosts an annual "Midnight Madness" event where the library is open until midnight all week for research purposes. Genealogists and others come from all over to research family histories, etc.

The Tri-State Genealogical Society formed in partnership with the Special Collections department at the library. They publish a packet every September, December, March, and June for their members.

== Haunting ==
The Willard Library is purported to be haunted by a specter known as the "Grey Lady", She is thought to be a girl named Louise Carpenter, daughter of Willard Carpenter. When Willard Carpenter died, he gave away the library. Louise Carpenter sued the library board in the 1890s, believing it was hers on the pretense that her father was not in a sound state of mind when he wrote his last will and testament. Louise Carpenter would go on to lose the case, and she is said to haunt the library in revenge. The first sighting of the gray lady was reported in the basement of the library in 1937 by a library custodian, who quit shortly after the encounter. People who have encountered the grey lady say they smelled the scent of perfume and heard strange noises. The library started putting up webcams in 1999 and currently has 6 of them.
