= Watson Elkinah Reid =

American architect

- Born: 1858; Harvey, Albert County, New Brunswick
- Died: 1944 (aged 85–86); Vancouver, Canada
- Education: Mount Allison University
- Occupation: Architect
- Employer: Reid & Reid
- Notable work: construction of Hotel del Coronado
- Spouse: Janie R. Turner (m.1890)
- Children: 5
- Parents: William J. Reid (father); Lucinda Robinson (mother)
- Relatives: James, Merritt (architect brothers)

Watson Elkinah Reid (1858–1944) was a Canadian architect, a one time member of the California architectural firm, Reid & Reid.

== Early life ==
Reid was born in Harvey, Albert County, New Brunswick to William J. Reid and Lucinda Robinson. He was the youngest of three sons who all followed the same profession. He studied at Mount Allison University.

== Career ==
About 1888, he joined his brothers James W. and Merritt in California, where he ran their San Diego office of Reid & Reid, overseeing construction of the massive Hotel del Coronado to his brother's designs. He returned to Canada in 1892 and had a few commissions there under the auspices of Senator Abner Reid McClelan such as Senator McClelan's home built in 1893 called Victoria Manor, the Riverside-Albert Consolidated School and the Albert County Court House.

== Personal life ==
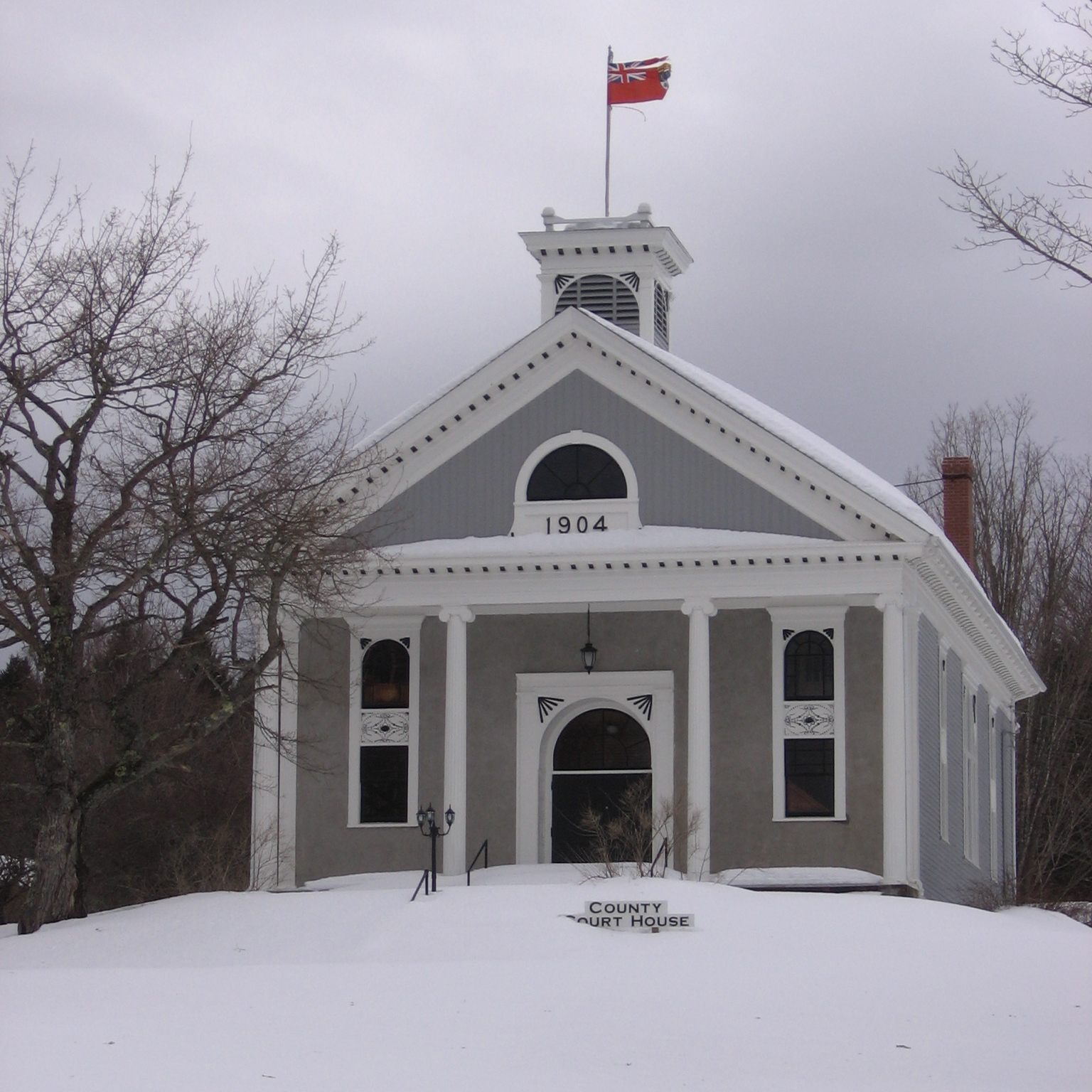
Albert County Court House (completed in 1904) was one of Reid's later designs

In 1890, he married Janie R. Turner of Harvey. They had five children, all born before 1901.

In his later years he moved to Vancouver where he died in 1944.
