= Mary's Point =

Wetland in Albert County, New Brunswick, Canada

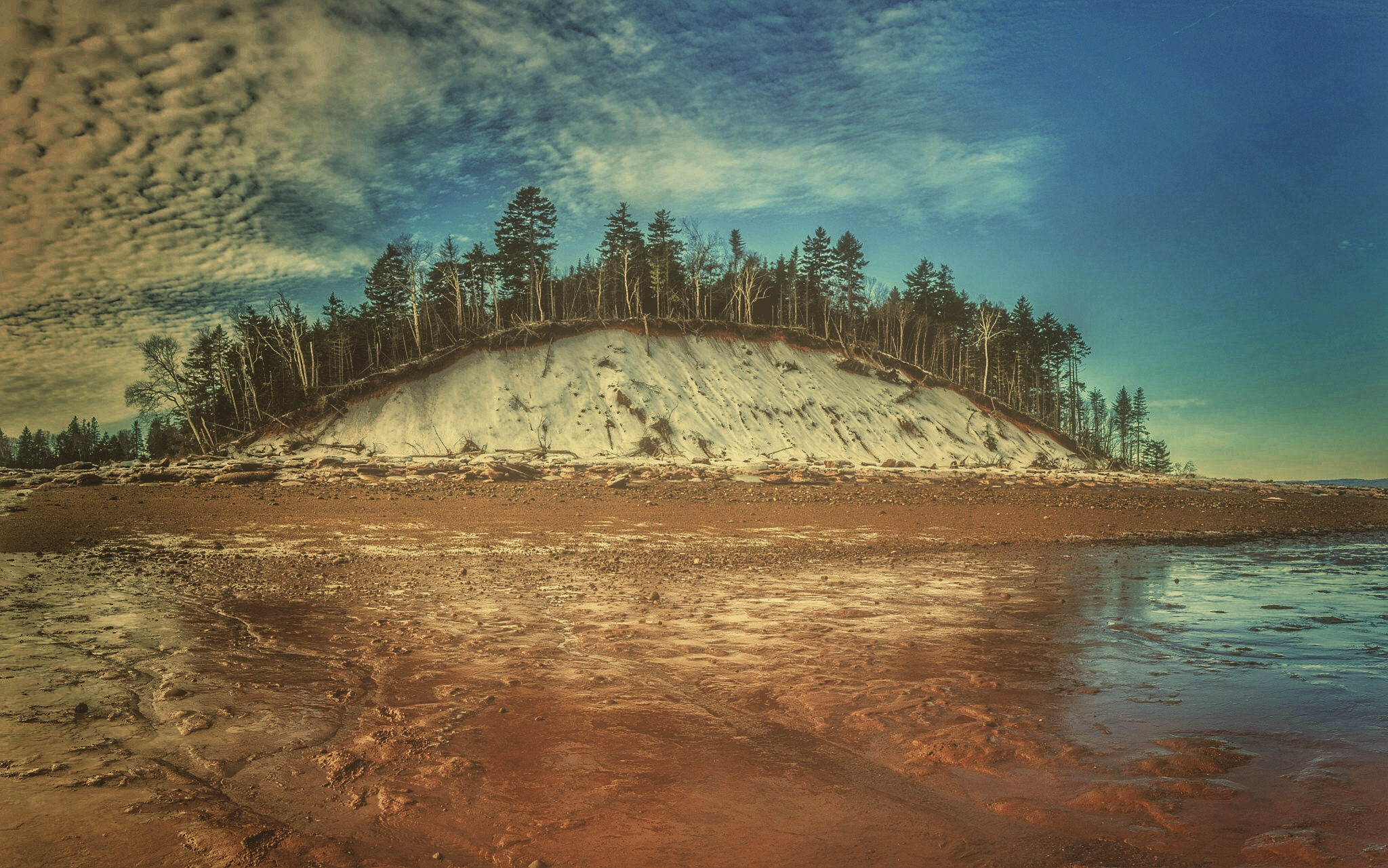
- Interactive map of Mary's Point
- Coordinates: 45°44′N 64°45′W
- Area: 12 square kilometres (4.6 sq mi)

Ramsar Wetland
- Designated: 24 May 1982
- Reference no.: 236

Mary's Point is a 12 square kilometres (4.6 sq mi) wetland in Albert County, New Brunswick, Canada. It is at the head of the Bay of Fundy, just outside the small community of Harvey and approximately 40 km (25 mi) south of Moncton. Designated a Ramsar wetland of international importance on May 24, 1982, it is also part of the Fundy biosphere reserve established in 2007, which also contains the Shepody Bay wetland. It was also the first Canadian site in the Western Hemisphere Shorebird Reserve, as part of the Bay of Fundy Hemisphere Shorebird Reserve. It is within the Shepody Bay National Wildlife Area, which is administered by the Canadian Wildlife Service.

Mary's Point is an important staging area for shorebirds migrating from the Canadian subarctic to South America during the fall, supporting up to two million semipalmated sandpipers annually, or nearly 75% of the global population of this species, as well as millions of birds of other species.

Approximately 940 ha (2,300 acres) of the intertidal mudflats are under jurisdiction to the province of New Brunswick. Another 107 ha (260 acres) are owned by the Government of Canada, including the "most critical sites used by the large roosting flocks of shorebirds during high tide". The remaining portion, covering most of the salt marsh, is privately owned. The federal government has attempted to purchase the land, but has been spurned.

== Geography ==
This open peninsula ranges in elevation from 2 m (6.6 ft) below sea level to 10 m (33 ft) above sea level, protruding into Shepody Bay. It is characterized by extensive intertidal mudflats, with gravel beaches bordering terrestrial habitats and shallow marine areas.

In 1979, Ducks Unlimited Canada established a 20 ha (49 acres) waterfowl impoundment adjacent to the salt marsh.

== Fauna ==
This site exhibits "the world's highest known density of the crustaceans Corophium volutator", up to 60,000 per square metre during their reproductive cycle, which supports large populations of migratory shorebirds. During August, up to two million semipalmated sandpipers may use Mary's Point as a staging area, and as many as 200,000 may be present at any time during migration. These double their weight to 40 g (1.4 oz) before continuing their migration by flying to the North Atlantic, which winds carry them to the northern coast of South America in two to four days.

Thousands of birds of other species also use Mary's Point as a staging area, including the black-bellied plover, least sandpiper, white-rumped sandpiper, short-billed dowitcher, semipalmated plover, red knot, sanderling and dunlin.

Also, small populations of American black duck, ring-necked duck and blue-winged teal breed at the impoundment established by Ducks Unlimited.

== History ==
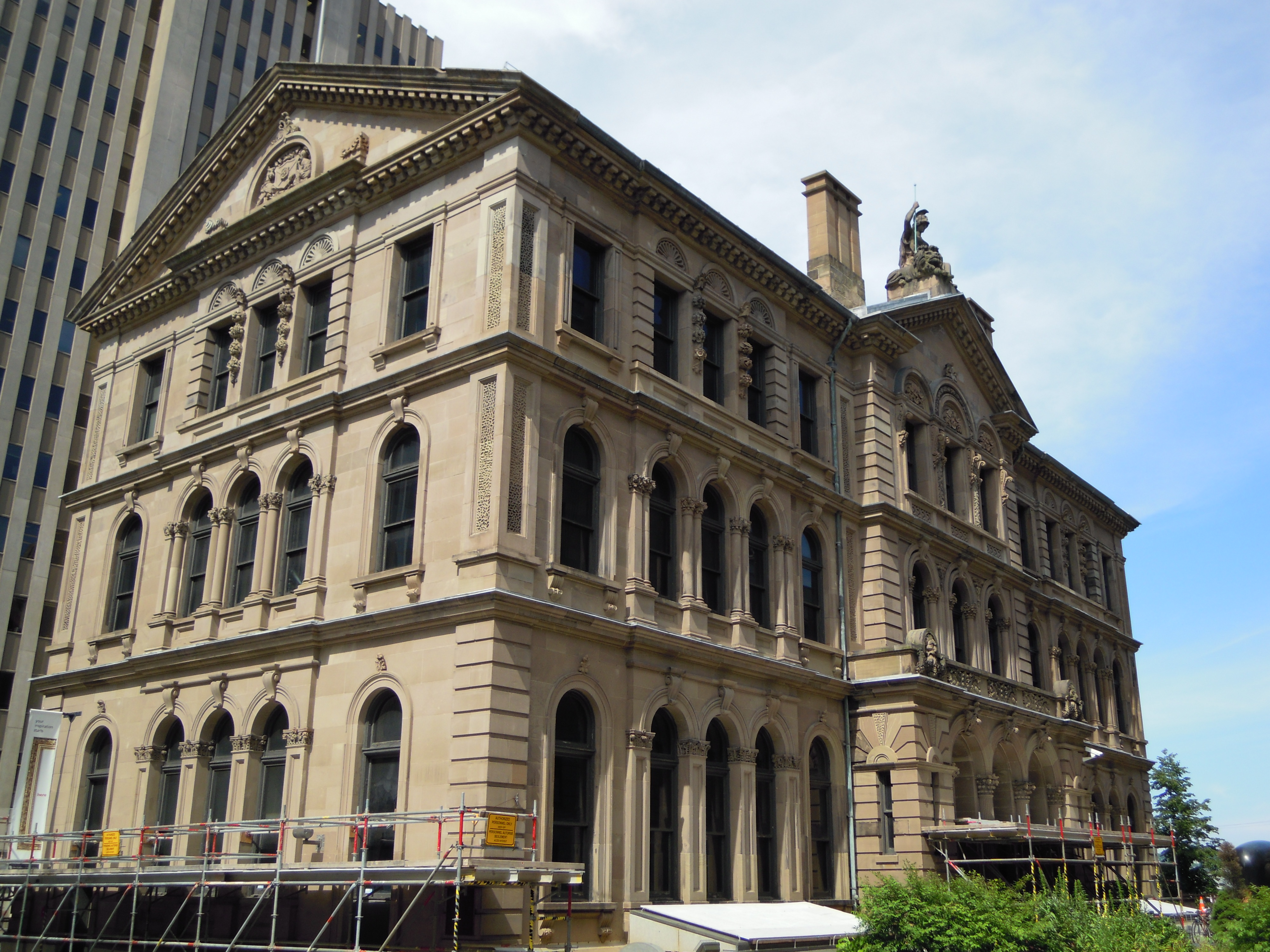
The Art Gallery of Nova Scotia was built of Mary's Point sandstone.

Mary's Point was a sandstone quarry which in the nineteenth century produced brownish-grey and brownish-red dimension stone (termed Mary's Point Grey and Mary's Point Red, respectively.) used throughout eastern North America as far away as Philadelphia and New York (the Bethesda Terrace in Central Park is an example using Mary's Point stone). The Mary's Point quarry yielded about 4,000 tons of stone annually, valued for its durability and workability. Geologically, the bedrock is a continuation of Grindstone Island, situated nearby to the east in Shepody Bay. An important associate of the quarry, at one time called the Albert Freestone Company, was George Lang, a builder responsible for several notable Halifax structures using Mary's Point stone. The quarry was opened for the last time in 1987 to provide stone used in the restoration of the former Dominion Building in Halifax, now the Art Gallery of Nova Scotia. In Halifax St. Mary's stone was also used on the Welsford-Parker Monument (1857), the Halifax Court House (1858-63), and The Halifax Club (1862).
