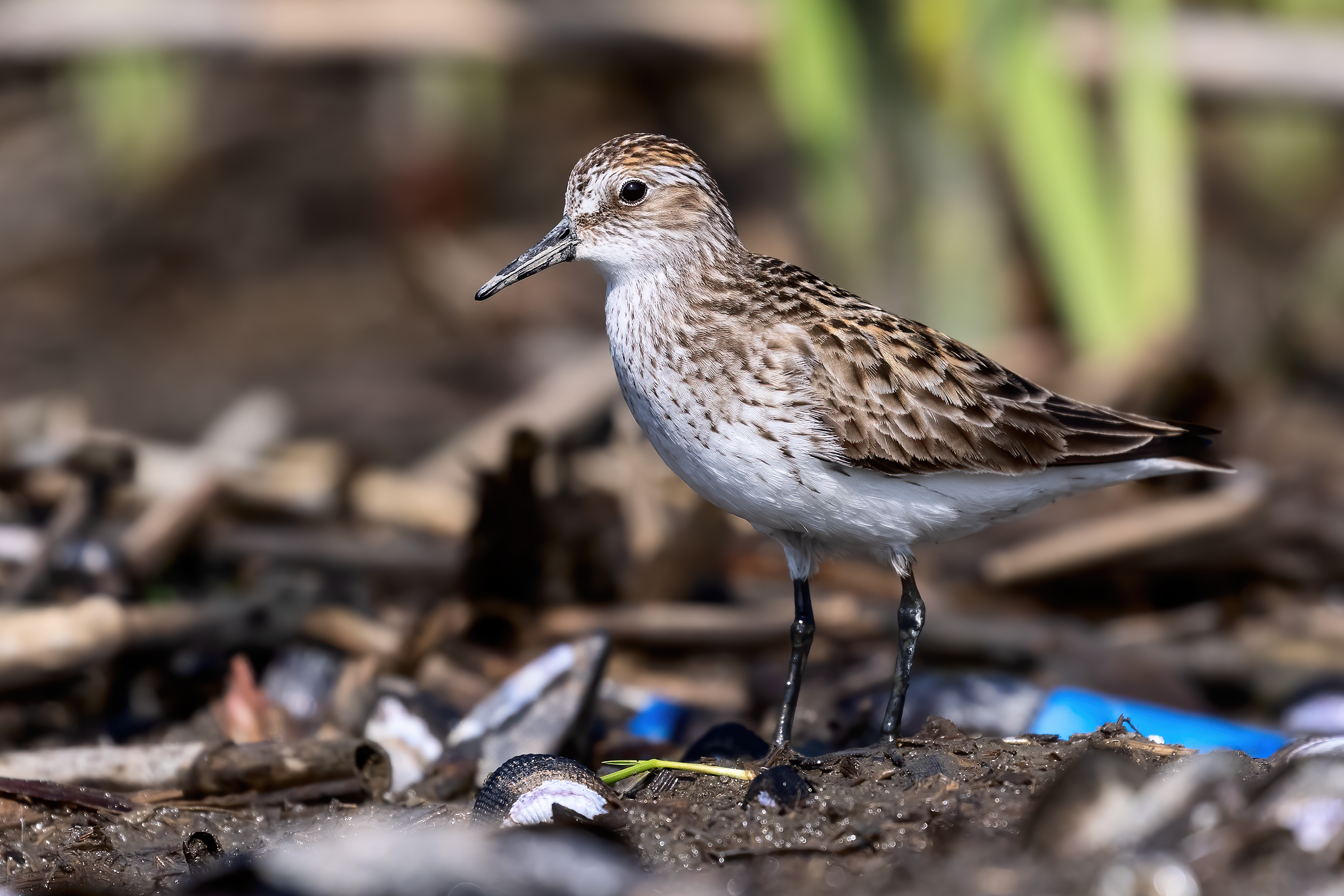
- Individual in pre-breeding plumage on a mudflat in Heislerville, Cumberland County, NJ, May 2022.
- Semipalmated sandpiper call Long Island, NY, April 2004. By Tony Phillip.

Conservation status
- Near Threatened (IUCN 3.1)

Scientific classification
- Kingdom: Animalia
- Phylum: Chordata
- Class: Aves
- Order: Charadriiformes
- Family: Scolopacidae
- Genus: Calidris
- Species: C. pusilla

Binomial name
- Calidris pusilla (Linnaeus, 1766)
- Breeding Migration Nonbreeding

Synonyms
- Tringa pusilla Linnaeus, 1766; Ereunetes pusillus (Linnaeus, 1766); Erolia pusilla (Linnaeus, 1766)

= Semipalmated sandpiper =

Species of bird

The semipalmated sandpiper (Calidris pusilla) is a very small shorebird. The genus name is from Ancient Greek kalidris or skalidris, a term used by Aristotle for some grey-coloured waterside birds. The specific pusilla is Latin for "very small".

Within the genus Calidris, the semipalmated sandpiper is most closely related to the western sandpiper (Calidris mauri). It was formerly sometimes separated with some other stints in either Ereunetes or Erolia, but these placements would leave the rest of Calidris a paraphyletic group.

== Description ==
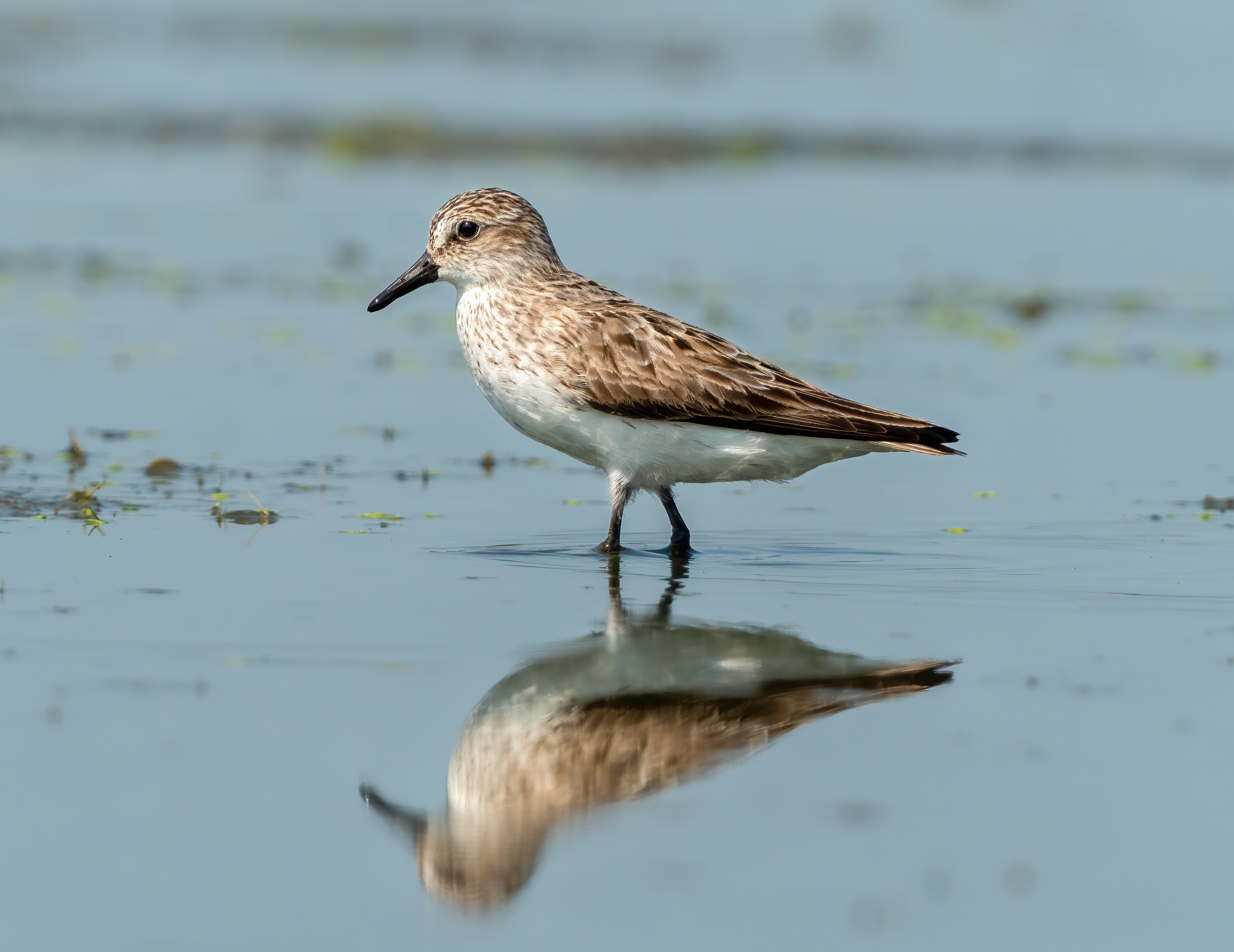
In worn post-breeding plumage in August, Jamaica Bay Wildlife Refuge, Queens, New York

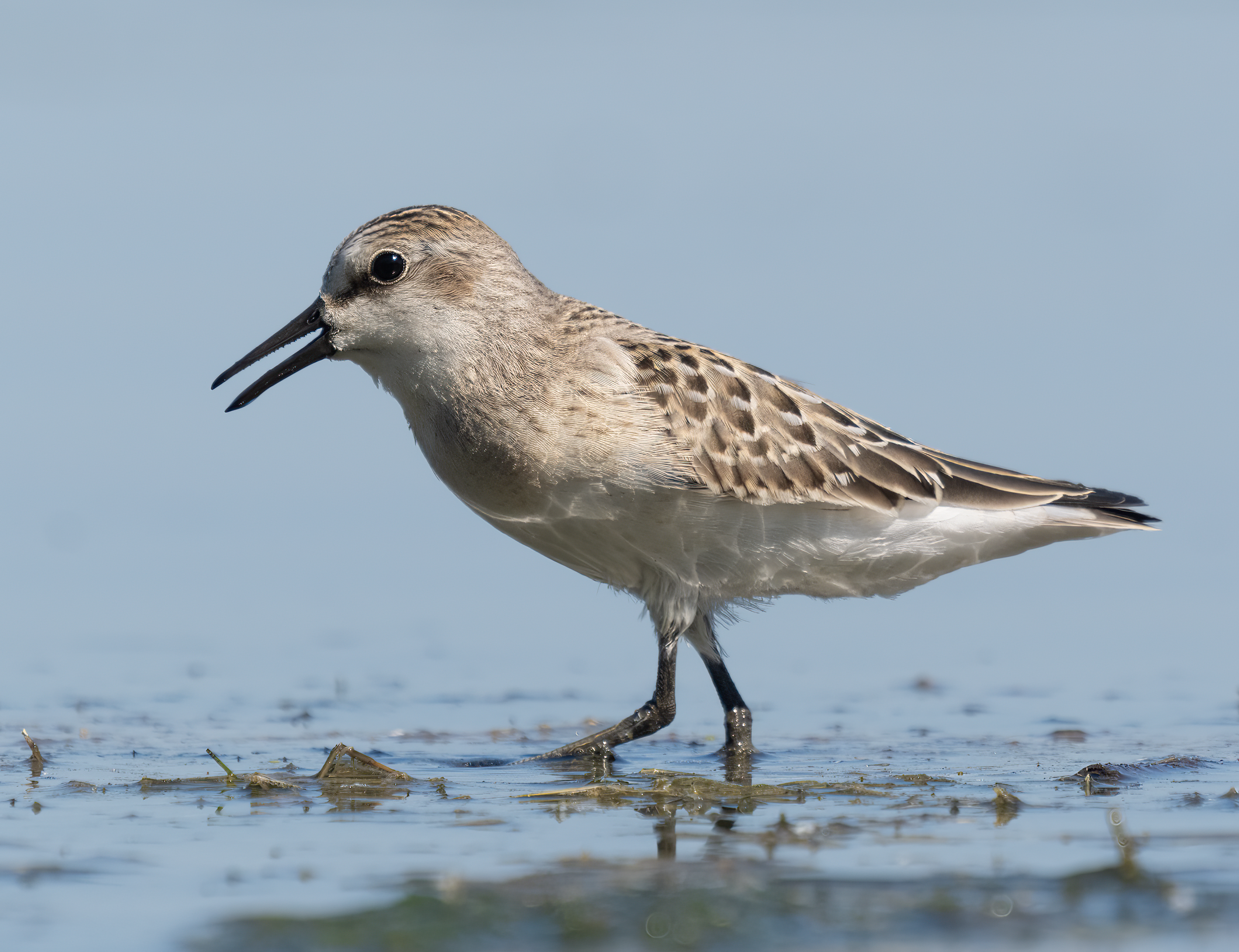
Vocalizing

It is a small sandpiper, 15–18 centimetres (6–7 inches) long and weighing around 18–51.5 grams (0.63–1.82 ounces). Wingspan ranges from 13.8 to 14.6 in (35 to 37 cm). Adults have black legs and a short, stout, straight dark bill. The body is dark grey-brown on top and white underneath. The head and neck are tinged light grey-brown. This bird can be difficult to distinguish from other similar tiny shorebirds, in particular the western sandpiper; these are known collectively as "peeps" or "stints".

== Breeding and habitat ==
Their breeding habitat is the southern tundra in Canada and Alaska near water. They nest on the ground. The male makes several shallow scrapes; the female chooses one and adds grass and other material to line the nest. The female lays 4 eggs; the male assists in incubation. After a few days, the female leaves the young with the male; the young feed themselves.

These birds forage on mudflats, picking up food by sight and feel (bill). They mainly eat aquatic insects and their larvae, spiders, marine worms, snails, and crustaceans. Semipalmated sandpipers rely heavily on horseshoe crab eggs during spring migration. Females will also eat small mammal bones as an extra source of calcium during egg laying.

== Status and migration ==
They are long distance migrants and winter in coastal South America, with some going to the southern United States and the Caribbean. They migrate in flocks which can number in the hundreds of thousands, particularly in favoured feeding locations such as the Bay of Fundy and Delaware Bay. This species is a rare but regular vagrant to western Europe.

Although very numerous, these birds are highly dependent on a few key stopover habitats during their migration, notably Mary's Point and Johnson's Mills along Shepody Bay, an arm of the Bay of Fundy. During the months of July and August, the Nature Conservancy of Canada runs an information center about these shorebirds in Johnson's Mills, New Brunswick.
