= Grein Building =

Coordinates: 37°58′15.7″N 87°34′26.2″W

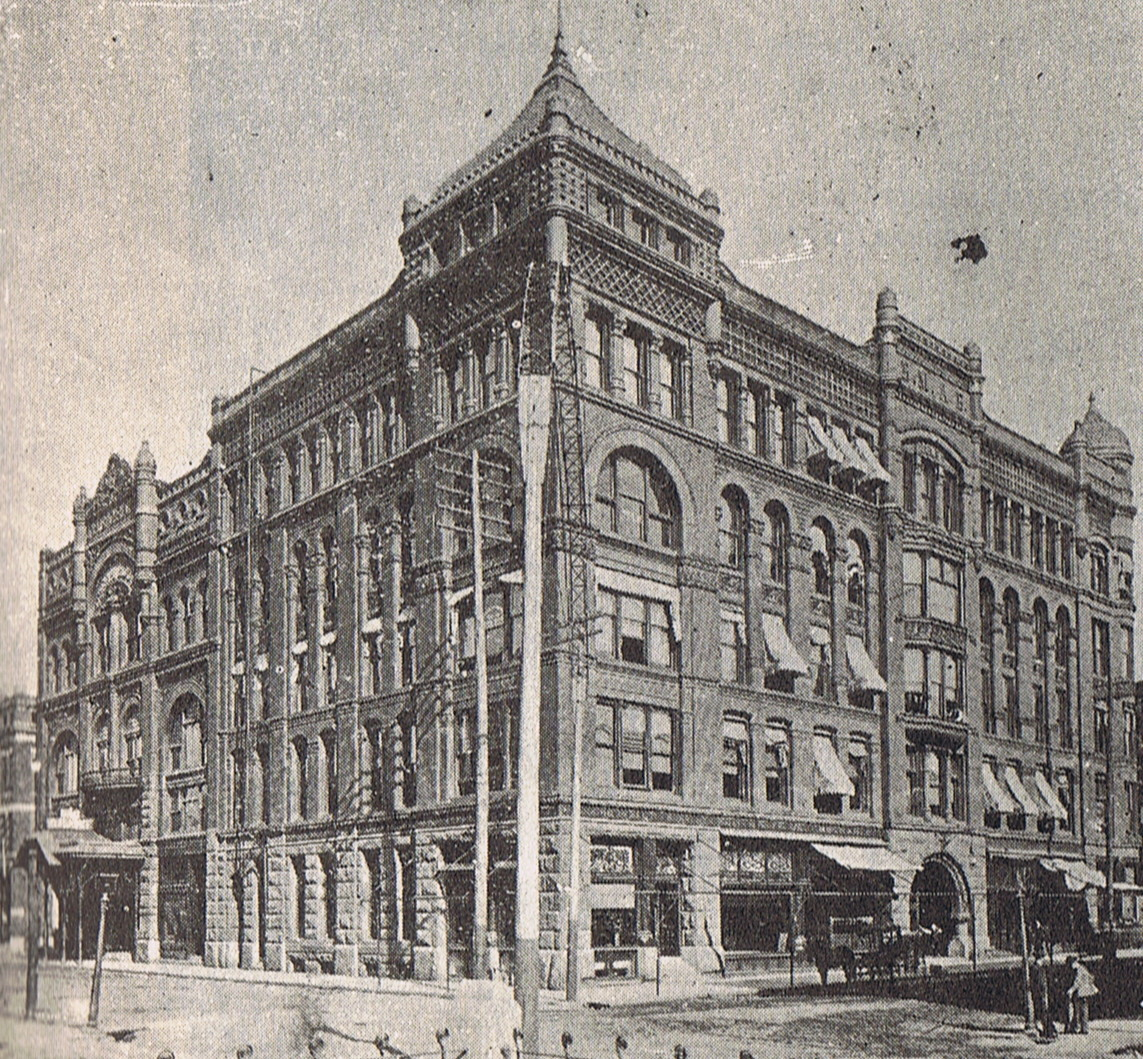
Grein Building ca. 1895

The Grein Building, also known as the Waverly Block, Business Men's Association Building, BMA Building, or Green Building, was constructed from 1887 to 1889 in Evansville, Indiana. It was designed by Reid & Reid (the Reid brothers) and demolished in 1972. It was a 6-story brownstone and red granite Renaissance revival style building at 12 NW 2nd Street on the corner of 2nd Street and Sycamore Avenue.

Originally the Business Men's Association building (a predecessor to the chamber of commerce), it was built on the site of the original Assumption Catholic Church and featured an 18-foot rusticated arch over its main entrance. The Grand Opera was adjacent.

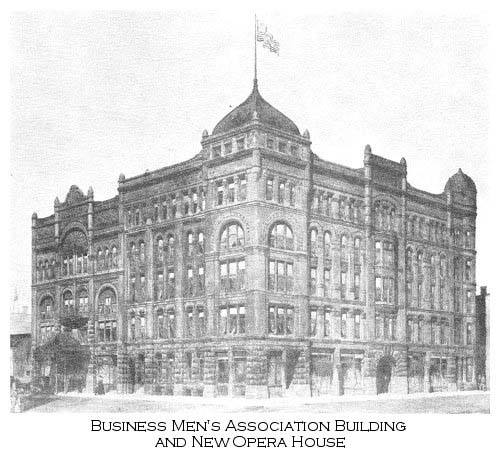

It was home to the Mercantile Commercial Bank before becoming known as the Grein Building when it was sold to Ann Grein in 1938. It was the "headquarters of Evansville’s mid-century oil boom" and had offices for prominent local lawyers. It was torn down in 1972 along with the Grand Theater and Vendome hotel, as part of an urban redevelopment project. The site became a parking garage.
