= Harvey, Albert County, New Brunswick =

Rural community in New Brunswick, Canada

Coordinates: 45°43′N 64°43′W

Harvey is a Canadian rural community in Albert County, New Brunswick. Harvey has a wharf, and is situated on Shepody Bay, an arm of the Bay of Fundy. It has a population of about 150, and is about 50 minutes from Moncton. The village of Riverside-Albert is nearby.

== History ==
It has a historical life-size replica of a ship, the Revolving Light, which had been built there in the nineteenth century, and a nature reserve at Mary's Point which is noted for its shorebirds, in particular semipalmated sandpipers, which feed there each summer in large migrating flocks. Harvey was the former home of the politician and shipbuilder Gaius S. Turner, the British Columbia politician Harlan Carey Brewster as well as the Reid brothers, noted American architects.

== See also ==
- List of communities in New Brunswick
