= Fox Theatre (Redwood City, California) =

- New Sequoia Theater
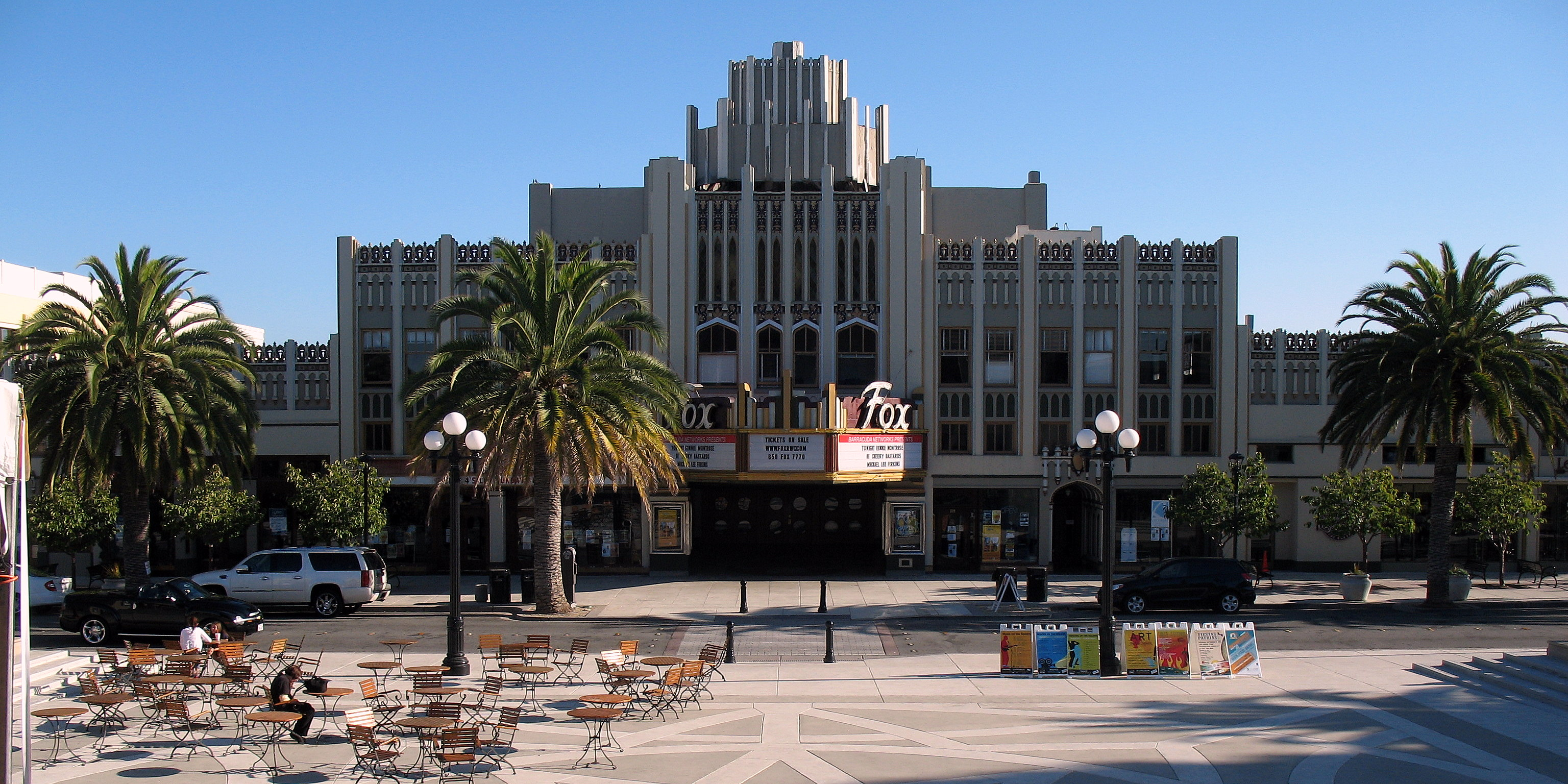

- Location within San Francisco Bay Area Location within California Location within the United States
- Address: 2215 Broadway Street; Redwood City, California; United States
- Coordinates: 37.48632°N 122.22962°W
- Owner: Peter Pau
- Capacity: 1,400
- Type: Movie palace
- Screen: 1
- Current use: Live event venue

Construction
- Opened: January 2, 1929
- Reopened: 2010
- Architect: Reid & Reid

Website
- www.foxrwc.com
- New Sequoia Theater Building
- U.S. National Register of Historic Places
- Area: 0.6 acres (0.24 ha)
- Built: 1928; 98 years ago
- Architect: Reid & Reid
- Architectural style: Late Gothic Revival
- NRHP reference No.: 94000431
- Added to NRHP: 5 May 1994

The Fox Theatre in Redwood City, CA opened in 1929, was remodeled in 1950, and was listed on National Register of Historic Places in 1994.

== History ==
The Fox Theatre opened its door to the public on January 2, 1929 as The New Sequoia Theater by Ellis John Arkursh to show motion pictures. Touring Europe Arkush gathered all of his favorite architectural details from various venues to create the Moorish feel and style on the inside and the gothic feel on the exterior which was executed beautifully by the Reid & Reid architects of San Francisco.

Used mainly for motion pictures, the theater was purchased by the Fox West Coast Chain only a few months after the opening and it continued to be used for movie attractions for a number of years until the theater was closed for renovations in June 1950 for 4 months before re-opening its doors September 1950 for live performances and shows.

After its renovations the theater became a popular venue for such artists as Vanessa Williams, Etta James, Bill Cosby, Chris Isaak, Neil Young, Carl Palmer, Tony Bennett, Melissa Etheridge, and BB King.

In 1993 the theater was inducted to the National Register of Historic Places.

In 2009 the theater went into foreclosure owing unpaid taxes and mortgage payments. Coast Capital Income Fund, one of the creditors, planned to auction off the property in October of that year.

In the summer of 2010, the Fox Theatre Redwood City was purchased by local entrepreneurs Eric Lochtefeld and Lori Lochtefeld, along with Eric's company Dream Careers Inc. It was reopened in September 2010.

In February 2017, it was announced that Peter Pau had acquired the theater. The Lochtefelds stated that they planned to continue to operate the theater for four more years and then retire after operating the theater continuously for ten years.

== Gallery ==
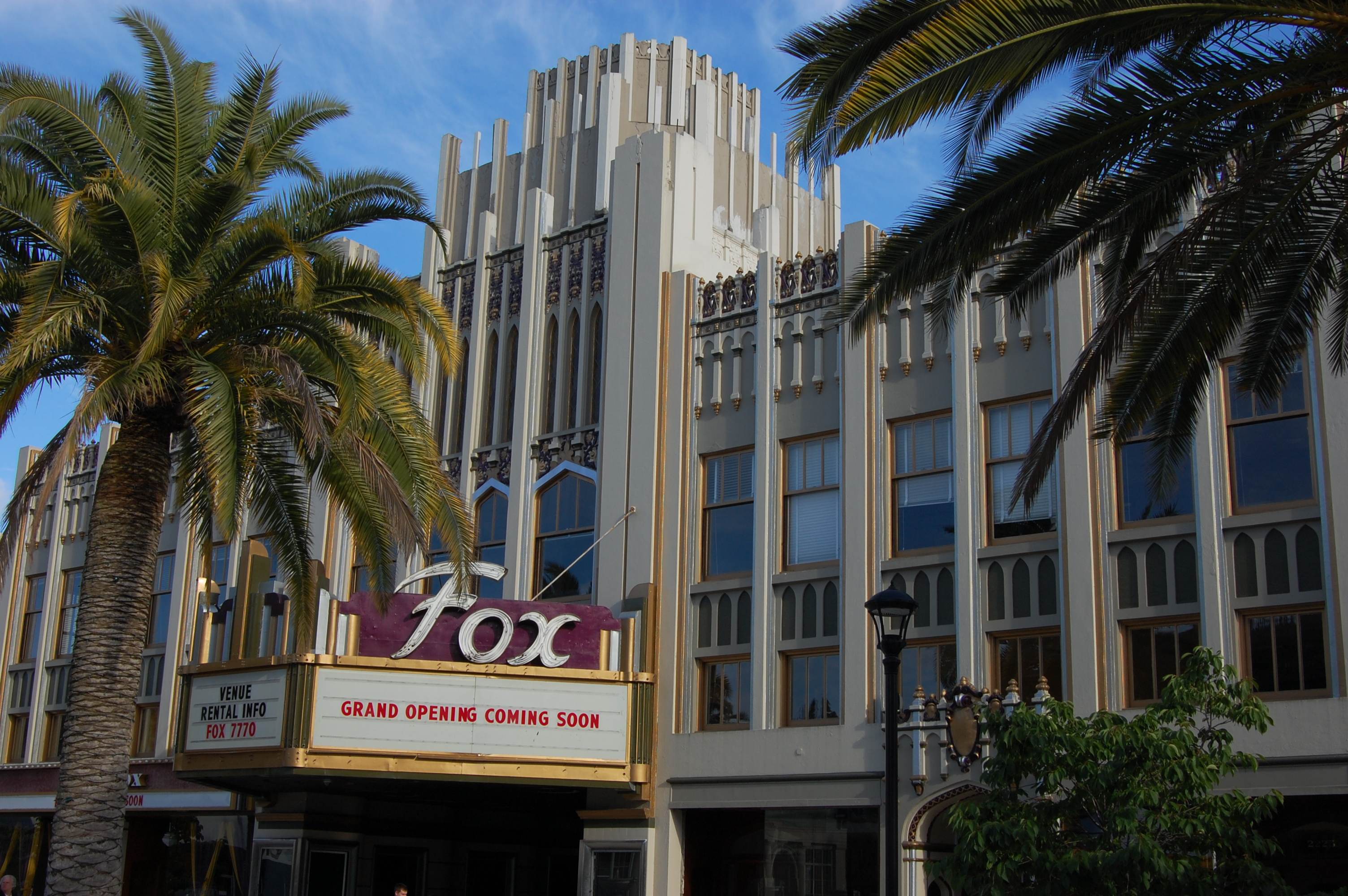
View from across plaza

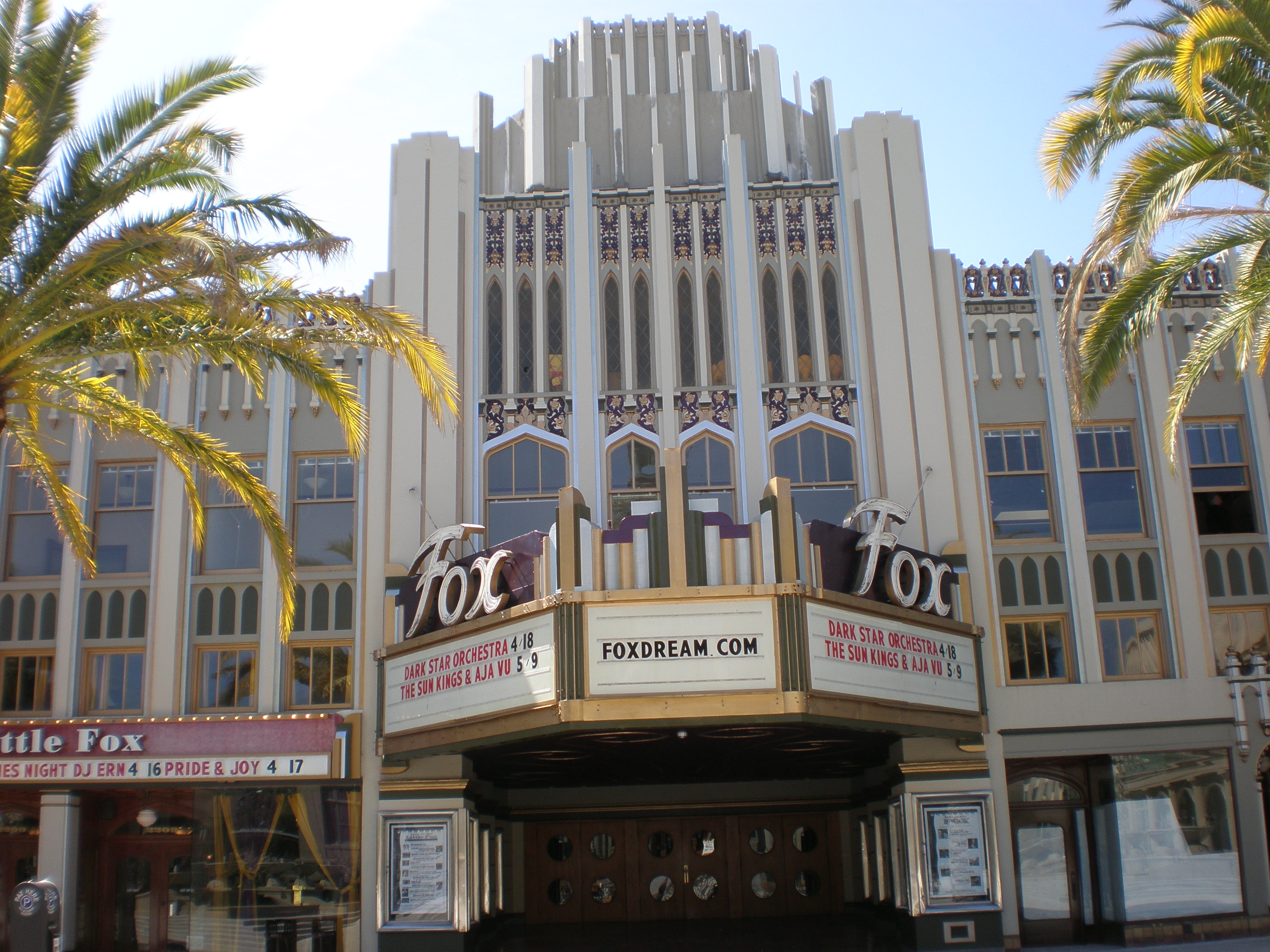
Front

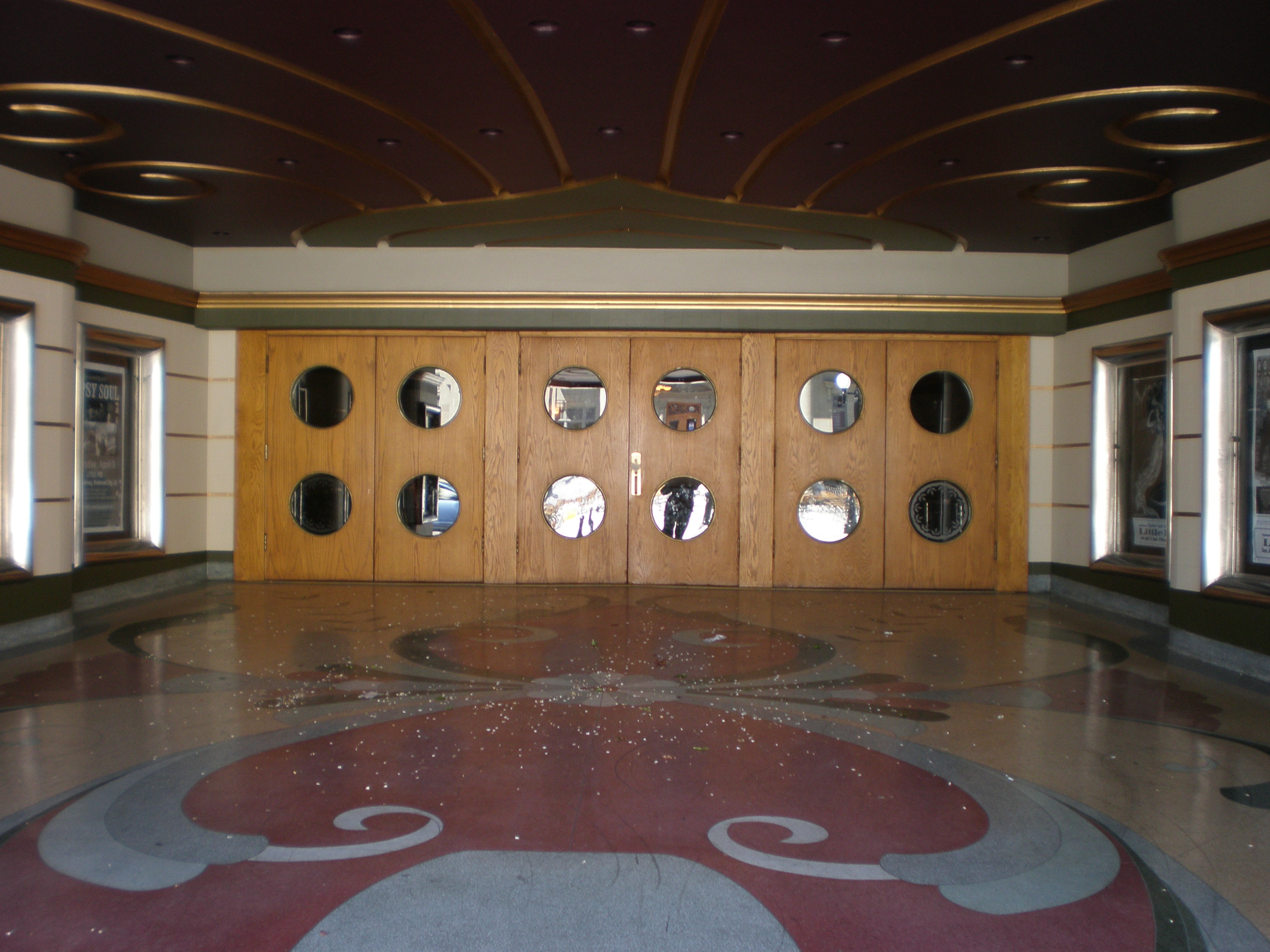
Entrance

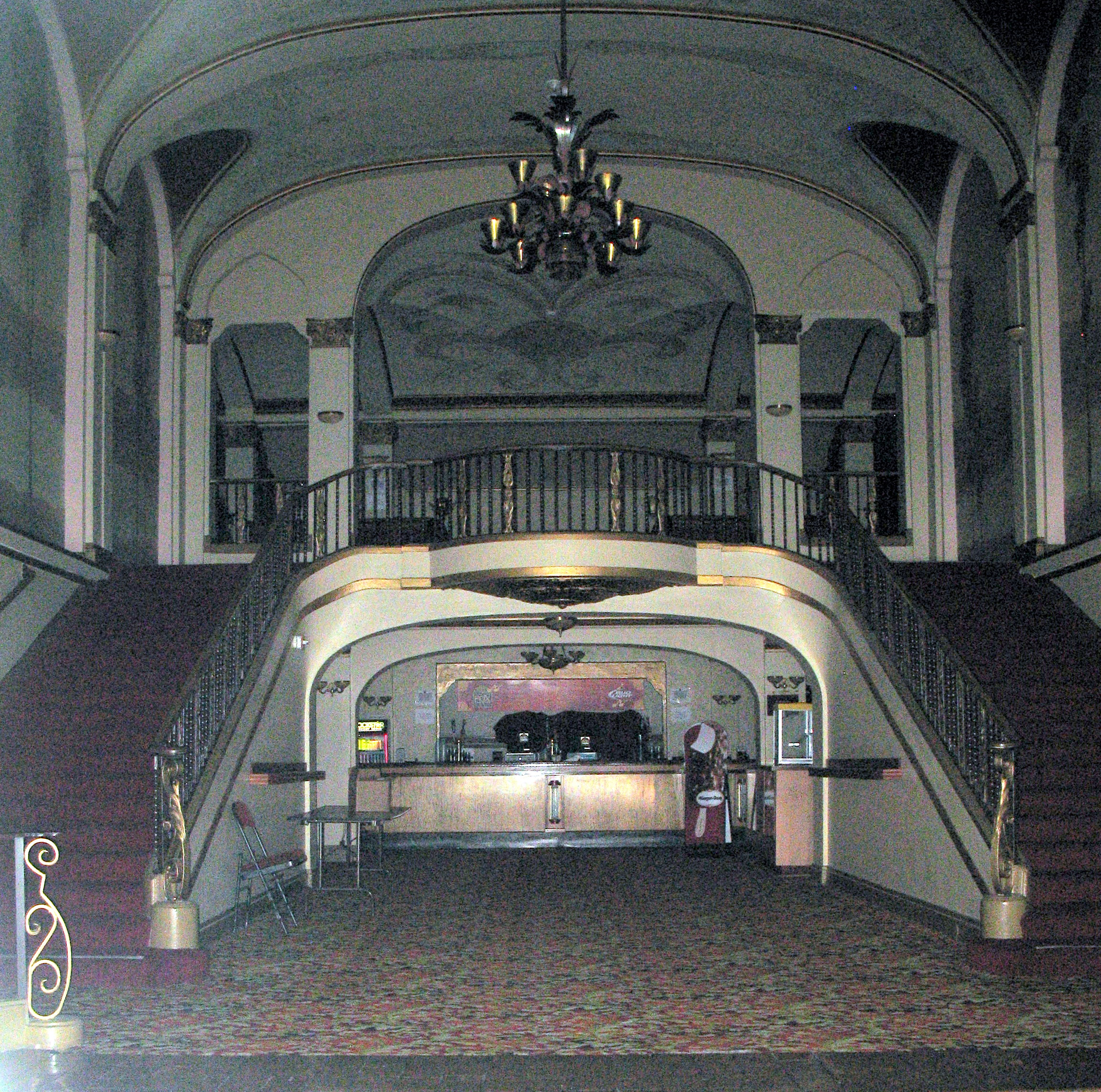
Concessions and stairs

== See also ==
- San Mateo County History Museum
- National Register of Historic Places listings in San Mateo County, California
- Fox Theatres
