= Cloud State Bank =

- U.S. National Register of Historic Places
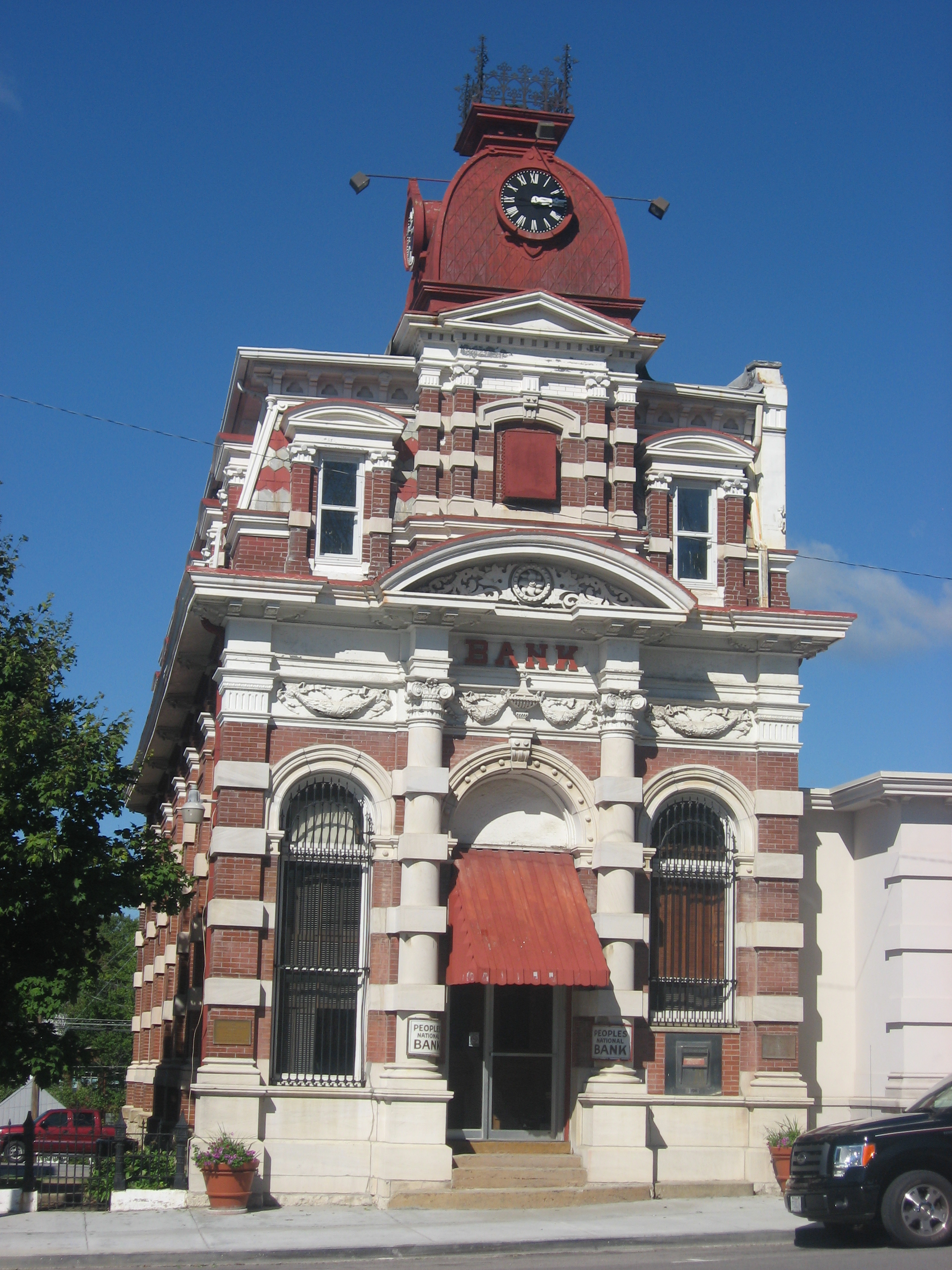
- Front of the bank

- Location within Illinois Location within the United States
- Location: 122 S. Washington St., McLeansboro, Illinois
- Coordinates: 38°5′35″N 88°32′10″W
- Area: less than one acre
- Built: 1882
- Architect: Cloud, Chalon G
- NRHP reference No.: 78001149
- Added to NRHP: November 28, 1978

The Cloud State Bank, also known as the People's National Bank, is located in McLeansboro, Hamilton County, Illinois. The bank building was designed and built from 1880 to 1882 by Aaron G. Cloud and his son Chalon Cloud. The Cloud State Bank has been on the National Register of Historic Places since 1978. The building was designed by architects the Reid Brothers of Evansville, Indiana. The Reid Brothers would go on to famously design the Hotel del Coronado near San Diego.
