= Illinois Route 242 =

State highway in southern Illinois, US

Illinois Route 242
- IL 242 highlighted in red

Route information
- Maintained by IDOT
- Length: 18.67 mi (30.05 km)
- Existed: 1924 as Route 142A; 1977 as Route 242–present

Major junctions
- South end: IL 142 in McLeansboro
- I-64 in Mayberry
- North end: IL 15 in Wayne City

Location
- Country: United States
- State: Illinois
- Counties: Hamilton, Wayne

Highway system
- Illinois State Highway System; Interstate; US; State; Tollways; Scenic
← IL 203	→ IL 250

Illinois Route 242 is a 18.67-mile (30.05 km) north–south state highway in southern Illinois that runs from Illinois Route 142 in McLeansboro north to Illinois Route 15 in Wayne City. The route serves as a spur of Illinois Route 142, which runs north–south from Mount Vernon to Equality. Route 242 also connects two east–west trunk routes, Illinois Route 14 and Illinois 15. Route 242 passes through the counties of Hamilton and Wayne. The highway is maintained by the Illinois Department of Transportation.

== Route description ==
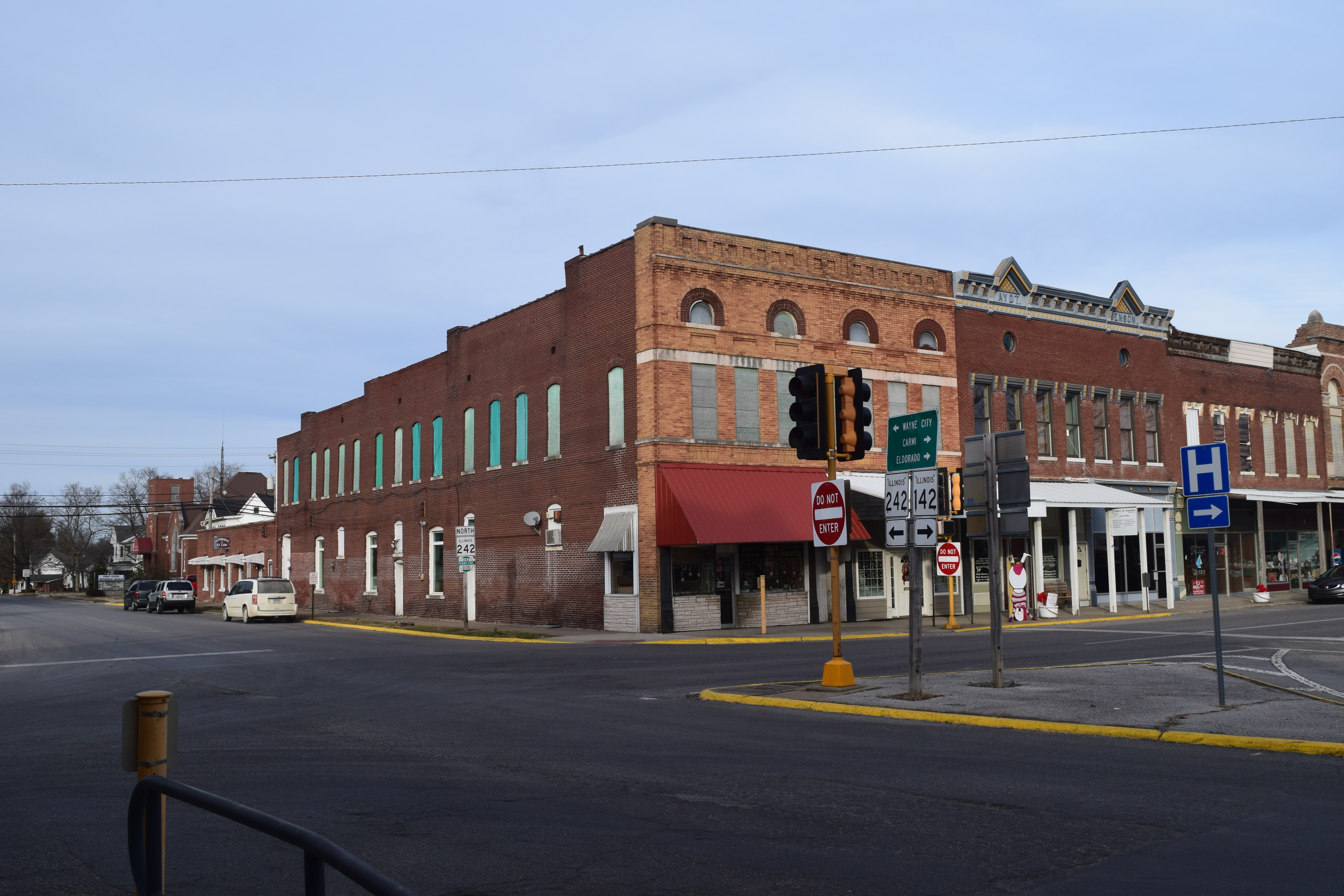
Southern terminus of Route 242 in McLeansboro

Route 242 begins at an intersection with Route 142 in McLeansboro, Hamilton County; this intersection is near Route 14, which runs through McLeansboro to the south. The route heads north from McLeansboro into McLeansboro Township, passing through farmland with scattered houses. It runs through South Crouch Township before entering Crouch Township. Route 242 passes to the east of Belle Prairie City before crossing into Wayne County. The highway enters Orel Township in Wayne County and intersects Interstate 64 in the unincorporated community of Mayberry. Route 242 heads northwest from Mayberry before turning north toward Wayne City. The highway terminates in Wayne City at a junction with Route 15.

== History ==
A route between McLeansboro and Wayne City was marked on Illinois road maps in 1922. The road which is now Route 242 was designated in 1924 as Illinois Route 142A between McLeansboro and Wayne City, along a more westerly path through Belle Prairie City. Route 142A was first numbered on the 1929 Illinois state highway map. The route was moved to its current route in 1931. By 1942, the road was renumbered as Illinois Route 147, and it became part of Route 142 in 1946. The road became Route 242 by 1977.

== Major intersections ==
County	Location	mi	km	Destinations	Notes
Hamilton	McLeansboro	0.0	0.0	IL 142	Southern terminus of IL 242
Wayne	Mayberry	12.2	19.6	I-64 – Mt. Vernon, Evansville	Exit 100 on I-64
Wayne	Wayne City	18.7	30.1	IL 15	Northern terminus of IL 242
1.000 mi = 1.609 km; 1.000 km = 0.621 mi
