= South Flannigan Township, Hamilton County, Illinois =

South Flannigan Township
- Township
- Location in Hamilton County

- Hamilton County's location in Illinois
- Coordinates: 37°55′50″N 88°39′20″W
- Country: United States
- State: Illinois
- County: Hamilton
- Established: November 3, 1885

Area
  - Total: 18.38 sq mi (47.6 km^{2})
  - Land: 18.34 sq mi (47.5 km^{2})
  - Water: 0.04 sq mi (0.10 km^{2}) 0.21%
- Elevation: 531 ft (162 m)

Population (2020)
  - Total: 148
  - Density: 8.07/sq mi (3.12/km^{2})
- Time zone: UTC-6 (CST)
  - Summer (DST): UTC-5 (CDT)
- ZIP codes: 62817, 62890, 62935
- FIPS code: 17-065-70785

South Flannigan Township is one of twelve townships in Hamilton County, Illinois, USA. As of the 2020 census, its population was 148 and it contained 67 housing units. It was formed from Flannigan Township.

== Geography ==
According to the 2021 census gazetteer files, South Flannigan Township has a total area of 18.38 square miles (47.60 km^{2}), of which 18.34 square miles (47.50 km^{2}) (or 99.79%) is land and 0.04 square miles (0.10 km^{2}) (or 0.21%) is water.

=== Unincorporated towns ===
- University at 37.936437°N 88.609499°W

(This list is based on USGS data and may include former settlements.)

=== Cemeteries ===
The township contains these two cemeteries: Good Hope and Winn.

== Demographics ==
As of the 2020 census there were 148 people, 7 households, and 7 families residing in the township. The population density was 8.05 inhabitants per square mile (3.11/km^{2}). There were 67 housing units at an average density of 3.65 per square mile (1.41/km^{2}). The racial makeup of the township was 94.59% White, 0.00% African American, 0.00% Native American, 0.00% Asian, 0.00% Pacific Islander, 0.00% from other races, and 5.41% from two or more races. Hispanic or Latino of any race were 0.68% of the population.

There were 7 households, all of which had children under the age of 18 living with them, and all were married couples living together. The average household size was 3.29 and the average family size was 3.29.

The township's age distribution consisted of 43.5% under the age of 18, 0.0% from 18 to 24, 56.5% from 25 to 44, 0% from 45 to 64, and 0.0% who were 65 years of age or older. The median age was 32.2 years. For every 100 females, there were 283.3 males. For every 100 females age 18 and over, there were 116.7 males.

Historical population
Census	Pop.	Note	%±
2000	136		—
2010	116		−14.7%
2020	148		27.6%
U.S. Decennial Census

== School districts ==
- Galatia Community Unit School District 1
- Hamilton County Community Unit School District 10
- Thompsonville Community Unit School District 174

== Political districts ==
- Illinois's 19th congressional district
- State House District 117
- State Senate District 59
