= Macedonia, Illinois =

- Village
- Location of Macedonia in Franklin and Hamilton Counties, Illinois.
- Coordinates: 38°03′09″N 88°42′19″W
- Country: United States
- State: Illinois
- Counties: Franklin, Hamilton
- Townships: Knights Prairie, Northern

Area
  - Total: 0.28 sq mi (0.72 km^{2})
  - Land: 0.27 sq mi (0.70 km^{2})
  - Water: 0.0039 sq mi (0.01 km^{2})
- Elevation: 535 ft (163 m)

Population (2020)
  - Total: 30
  - Density: 110.3/sq mi (42.57/km^{2})
- Time zone: UTC-6 (CST)
  - Summer (DST): UTC-5 (CDT)
- ZIP code: 62860
- Area code: 618
- FIPS code: 17-45642
- GNIS feature ID: 2399214

Macedonia is a village in Franklin and Hamilton counties, Illinois, United States. The population was 30 at the 2020 census.

The Hamilton County portion of Macedonia is part of the Mount Vernon Micropolitan Statistical Area.

== History ==
The village was named after the ancient Greek kingdom of Macedonia.

== Geography ==
Macedonia is located 15 miles (24 km) northeast of Benton, the Franklin County seat, and 12 miles (19 km) west of McLeansboro, the Hamilton County seat.

According to the 2021 census gazetteer files, Macedonia has a total area of 0.28 square miles (0.73 km^{2}), of which 0.27 square miles (0.70 km^{2}) (or 98.19%) is land and 0.01 square miles (0.03 km^{2}) (or 1.81%) is water.

== Demographics ==
Historical population
Census	Pop.	Note	%±
1900	315		—
1910	285		−9.5%
1920	210		−26.3%
1930	178		−15.2%
1940	147		−17.4%
1950	127		−13.6%
1960	96		−24.4%
1970	86		−10.4%
1980	70		−18.6%
1990	58		−17.1%
2000	51		−12.1%
2010	63		23.5%
2020	30		−52.4%
U.S. Decennial Census

As of the 2020 census there were 30 people, 18 households, and 14 families residing in the village. The population density was 108.30 inhabitants per square mile (41.81/km^{2}). There were 24 housing units at an average density of 86.64 per square mile (33.45/km^{2}). The racial makeup of the village was 83.33% White, 3.33% African American, 3.33% Native American, 0.00% Asian, 0.00% Pacific Islander, 0.00% from other races, and 10.00% from two or more races. Hispanic or Latino of any race were 6.67% of the population.

There were 18 households, out of which 38.9% had children under the age of 18 living with them, 77.78% were married couples living together, 0.00% had a female householder with no husband present, and 22.22% were non-families. 22.22% of all households were made up of individuals, and 0.00% had someone living alone who was 65 years of age or older. The average household size was 2.64 and the average family size was 2.28.

The village's age distribution consisted of 26.8% under the age of 18, 0.0% from 18 to 24, 41.5% from 25 to 44, 7.3% from 45 to 64, and 24.4% who were 65 years of age or older. The median age was 36.9 years. For every 100 females, there were 215.4 males. For every 100 females age 18 and over, there were 130.8 males.

The per capita income for the village was $26,993. About 14.3% of families and 7.3% of the population were below the poverty line, including 0.0% of those under age 18 and 0.0% of those age 65 or over.
