= Broughton, Illinois =

- Village
- Location of Broughton in Hamilton County, Illinois.
- Coordinates: 37°56′04″N 88°27′45″W
- Country: United States
- State: Illinois
- County: Hamilton
- Township: Mayberry

Area
  - Total: 1.90 sq mi (4.91 km^{2})
  - Land: 1.89 sq mi (4.89 km^{2})
  - Water: 0.0039 sq mi (0.01 km^{2})
- Elevation: 377 ft (115 m)

Population (2020)
  - Total: 185
  - Density: 98/sq mi (37.8/km^{2})
- Time zone: UTC-6 (CST)
  - Summer (DST): UTC-5 (CDT)
- Zip code: 62817
- Area code: 618
- FIPS code: 17-08875
- GNIS ID: 2397470

Broughton is a village in Hamilton County, Illinois, United States. The population was 185 at the 2020 census. It is part of the Mount Vernon Micropolitan Statistical Area.

The village was founded in the 1720s as Saint Philippe du Grand Marais (called "St. Philippe") by French coureurs de bois. In the early 19th century, it was known as "Rectorville" for nearby Rector Creek, which had been named for federal land surveyor John Rector.

== Geography ==
Illinois Route 142 passes through the village, leading north-northwest 12 miles (19 km) to McLeansboro, the county seat, and south 9 miles (14 km) to Eldorado.

According to the 2021 census gazetteer files, Broughton has a total area of 1.89 square miles (4.90 km^{2}), of which 1.89 square miles (4.90 km^{2}) (or 99.79%) is land and 0.00 square miles (0.00 km^{2}) (or 0.21%) is water.

=== Earthquake of 1968 ===
- Broughton was the closest village to the epicenter of the 1968 Illinois earthquake (at 37°57′00″ N, 88°28′48″ W), one of the most widely noticed tremors in United States history because it was felt in large populated areas like St. Louis and Chicago.

== Demographics ==
Historical population
Census	Pop.	Note	%±
1880	200		—
1900	327		—
1910	470		43.7%
1920	506		7.7%
1930	381		−24.7%
1940	387		1.6%
1950	324		−16.3%
1960	235		−27.5%
1970	235		0.0%
1980	263		11.9%
1990	218		−17.1%
2000	193		−11.5%
2010	194		0.5%
2020	185		−4.6%
U.S. Decennial Census

As of the 2020 census there were 185 people, 58 households, and 37 families residing in the village. The population density was 97.68 inhabitants per square mile (37.71/km^{2}). There were 85 housing units at an average density of 44.88 per square mile (17.33/km^{2}). The racial makeup of the village was 91.35% White, 2.16% African American, 0.00% Native American, 0.00% Asian, 0.00% Pacific Islander, 0.54% from other races, and 5.95% from two or more races. Hispanic or Latino of any race were 1.08% of the population.

There were 58 households, out of which 25.9% had children under the age of 18 living with them, 36.21% were married couples living together, 13.79% had a female householder with no husband present, and 36.21% were non-families. 36.21% of all households were made up of individuals, and 25.86% had someone living alone who was 65 years of age or older. The average household size was 2.41 and the average family size was 2.00.

The village's age distribution consisted of 12.1% under the age of 18, 7.8% from 18 to 24, 18.1% from 25 to 44, 36.2% from 45 to 64, and 25.9% who were 65 years of age or older. The median age was 51.4 years. For every 100 females, there were 152.2 males. For every 100 females age 18 and over, there were 126.7 males.

The median income for a household in the village was $23,571, and the median income for a family was $19,875. Males had a median income of $32,917 versus $16,667 for females. The per capita income for the village was $21,172. About 24.3% of families and 17.2% of the population were below the poverty line, including 14.3% of those under age 18 and none of those age 65 or over.
