= Delafield, Illinois =

- Unincorporated community
- Location within Illinois Location within the United States
- Coordinates: 38°08′52″N 88°36′10″W
- Country: United States
- State: Illinois
- County: Hamilton
- Elevation: 413 ft (126 m)
- Time zone: UTC-6 (Central (CST))
  - Summer (DST): UTC-5 (CDT)
- Area code: 618
- GNIS feature ID: 407101

Delafield is an unincorporated community in Dahlgren Township, Hamilton County, Illinois, United States. Delafield is located on Illinois Route 142, 5.5 miles (8.9 km) northwest of McLeansboro.

== History ==
Delafield was founded in 1872 when the railroad was extended to that point. A post office was established at Delafield in 1872, and remained in operation until 1953.
