= Blairsville, Illinois =

Blairsville, Illinois may refer to the following places in the U.S. state of Illinois:

- Blairsville, Hamilton County, Illinois, an unincorporated community
- Blairsville, Williamson County, Illinois, an unincorporated community
