= Piopolis =

Piopolis may refer to:

- Piopolis, Illinois, United States
- Piopolis, Quebec, Canada
