= South Twigg Township, Hamilton County, Illinois =

South Twigg Township
- Township
- Location in Hamilton County

- Hamilton County's location in Illinois
- Coordinates: 37°55′50″N 88°31′59″W
- Country: United States
- State: Illinois
- County: Hamilton
- Established: November 3, 1885

Area
  - Total: 18.40 sq mi (47.7 km^{2})
  - Land: 18.35 sq mi (47.5 km^{2})
  - Water: 0.04 sq mi (0.10 km^{2}) 0.24%
- Elevation: 430 ft (130 m)

Population (2020)
  - Total: 129
  - Density: 7.03/sq mi (2.71/km^{2})
- Time zone: UTC-6 (CST)
  - Summer (DST): UTC-5 (CDT)
- ZIP codes: 62817, 62930, 62935
- FIPS code: 17-065-71305

South Twigg Township is one of twelve townships in Hamilton County, Illinois, USA. As of the 2020 census, its population was 129 and it contained 60 housing units. It was formed from a portion of Twigg Township.

== Geography ==
According to the 2021 census gazetteer files, South Twigg Township has a total area of 18.40 square miles (47.66 km^{2}), of which 18.35 square miles (47.53 km^{2}) (or 99.76%) is land and 0.04 square miles (0.10 km^{2}) (or 0.24%) is water.

=== Unincorporated towns ===
- Walpole at 37.936715°N 88.554775°W

(This list is based on USGS data and may include former settlements.)

=== Cemeteries ===
The township contains these two cemeteries: Barker and Roberts.

== Demographics ==
As of the 2020 census there were 129 people, 81 households, and 53 families residing in the township. The population density was 7.01 inhabitants per square mile (2.71/km^{2}). There were 60 housing units at an average density of 3.26 per square mile (1.26/km^{2}). The racial makeup of the township was 91.47% White, 0.00% African American, 0.00% Native American, 2.33% Asian, 0.00% Pacific Islander, 0.78% from other races, and 5.43% from two or more races. Hispanic or Latino of any race were 2.33% of the population.

There were 81 households, out of which 0.00% had children under the age of 18 living with them, 50.62% were married couples living together, 14.81% had a female householder with no spouse present, and 34.57% were non-families. No households were made up of individuals. The average household size was 1.89 and the average family size was 2.02.

The township's age distribution consisted of 0.0% under the age of 18, 0.0% from 18 to 24, 38.6% from 25 to 44, 61.4% from 45 to 64, and 0.0% who were 65 years of age or older. The median age was 56.2 years. For every 100 females, there were 88.9 males. For every 100 females age 18 and over, there were 88.9 males.

The median income for a household in the township was $65,052, and the median income for a family was $66,510. The per capita income for the township was $26,484. No families and 18.3% of the population were below the poverty line.

Historical population
| Census | Pop. | Note | %± |
|---|---|---|---|
| 2000 | 129 | | — |
| 2010 | 132 | | 2.3% |
| 2020 | 129 | | −2.3% |
U.S. Decennial Census

== School districts ==
- Eldorado Community Unit School District 4
- Galatia Community Unit School District 1
- Hamilton County Community Unit School District 10

== Political districts ==
- Illinois's 19th congressional district
- State House District 118
- State Senate District 59
