= Dahlgren, Illinois =

- Village
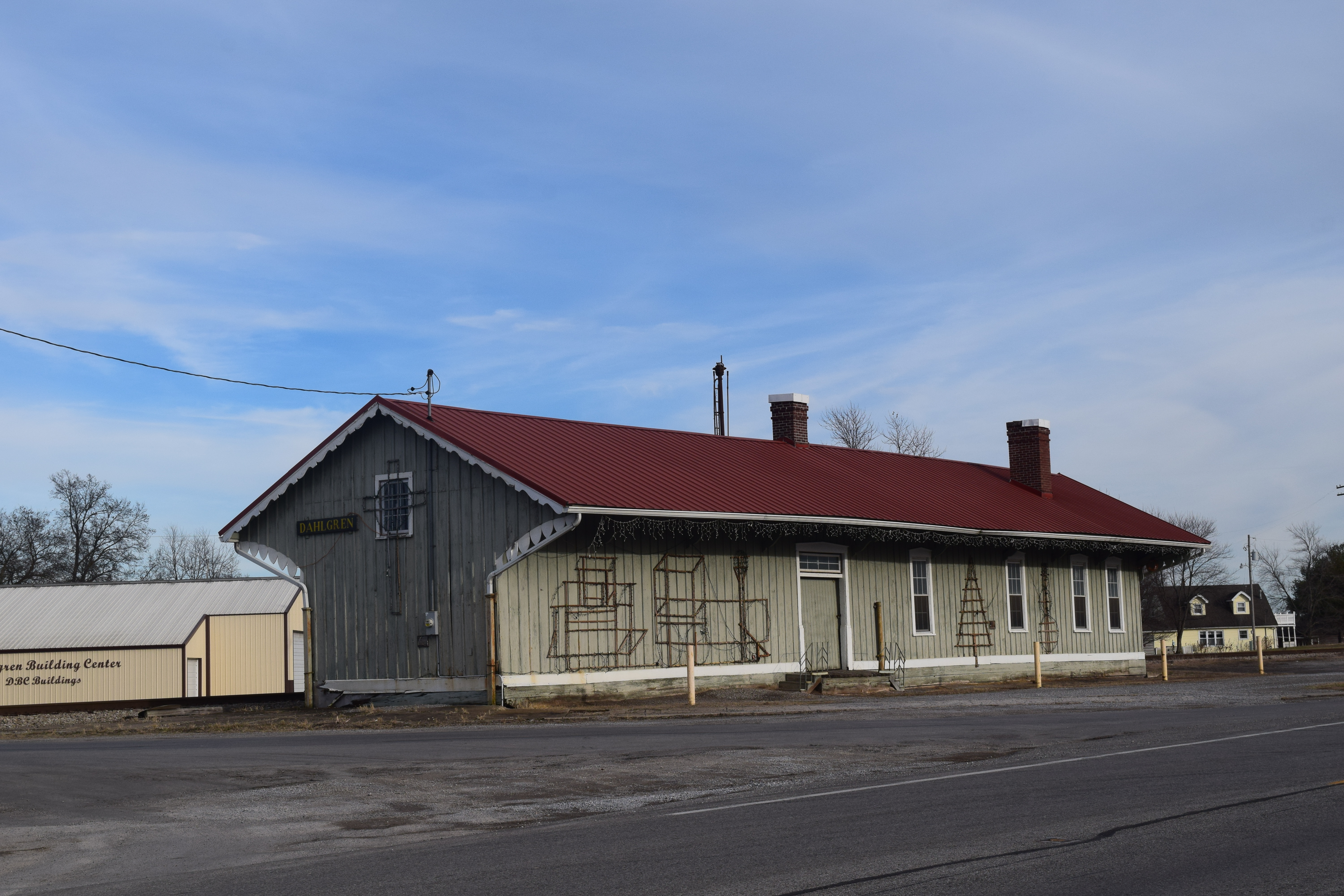
- The Dahlgren railroad depot in 2019

- Location of Dahlgren in Hamilton County, Illinois.
- Coordinates: 38°11′53″N 88°41′05″W
- Country: United States
- State: Illinois
- County: Hamilton
- Township: Dahlgren
- Founded: March 29, 1872
- Post Office Est.: December 11, 1871
- Named for: Admiral John A. Dahlgren
- Founder: A. M. Sturman

Government
  - Type: Trustee-Village Form
  - Body: Board (nonpartisan)
  - President: Steve Wilkerson (2025)
  - Trustees: Frank Elliot (2023); Jay Lentz (2025); Steve Drenner (2025); Doug Anselment (2023); Brandon Reyling (2025); David Wicks, Jr. (2023)
  - Treasurer: Diane Hines
  - Clerk: Sue Wilkerson (2025)

Area
  - Total: 1.02 sq mi (2.63 km^{2})
  - Land: 1.02 sq mi (2.63 km^{2})
  - Water: 0 sq mi (0.00 km^{2})
- Elevation: 515 ft (157 m)

Population (2020)
  - Total: 504
  - Density: 495.5/sq mi (191.31/km^{2})
- Time zone: UTC-6 (CST)
  - Summer (DST): UTC-5 (CDT)
- ZIP code: 62828
- Area code: 618
- FIPS code: 17-18303
- GNIS ID: 2398669

Dahlgren is a village in Hamilton County, Illinois, United States. The population was 504 at the 2020 census. It is part of the Mount Vernon Micropolitan Statistical Area.

== History ==
The area around present-day Dahlgren was known in the 1860s as the Shelton Precinct in Hamilton County before townships were formally established. In 1869 surveyors for the St. Louis & South-Eastern Rail Road (predecessor to the Louisville and Nashville Railroad) referred to the future town site as "Little Prairie." Construction of the railroad commenced in 1870 and was completed through the area in late 1871. At that time railroad officials applied to establish a post office in the nascent town which was to be home to the local railroad section boss. After the name "Cottonwood" was rejected by the U. S. postmaster (having already been used in Illinois) the name "Dahlgren" was assigned and the post office commenced operation on December 11, 1871. The village was named for John A. Dahlgren (1809–1870), a U.S. naval officer prominent during the American Civil War. On March 29, 1872, the official founding date of the village, A. M. Sturman executed a Deed of Dedication whereby he ceded 1 square mile of land centered on present day Main and 3rd Streets to formally layout the town. All land titles in Dahlgren derive from this original Deed of Dedication which was itself based on the original surveys conducted pursuant to Northwest Ordinance of 1787. The original settlement of Dahlgren extended roughly from the railroad depot/Chestnut St. (originally "A" Street) south to Sturmman St (originally "D" Street) and from 1st St. west to 5th St., a total of 12 square blocks.

== Geography ==
Illinois Route 142 passes through the village, leading southeast 11 miles (18 km) to McLeansboro, the county seat, and northwest 15 miles (24 km) to Mount Vernon.

According to the 2021 census gazetteer files, Dahlgren has a total area of 1.02 square miles (2.64 km^{2}), all land.

== Demographics ==
Historical population
Census	Pop.	Note	%±
1880	205		—
1890	301		46.8%
1900	452		50.2%
1910	654		44.7%
1920	693		6.0%
1930	625		−9.8%
1940	595		−4.8%
1950	609		2.4%
1960	480		−21.2%
1970	487		1.5%
1980	508		4.3%
1990	512		0.8%
2000	514		0.4%
2010	525		2.1%
2020	504		−4.0%
U.S. Decennial Census

As of the 2020 census, there were 504 people, 273 households, and 194 families residing in the village. The population density was 495.58 inhabitants per square mile (191.34/km^{2}). There were 232 housing units at an average density of 228.12 per square mile (88.08/km^{2}). The racial makeup of the village was 94.84% White, 0.40% African American, 0.00% Native American, 0.40% Asian, 0.00% Pacific Islander, 0.20% from other races, and 4.17% from two or more races. Hispanic or Latino of any race were 0.79% of the population.

There were 273 households, out of which 20.9% had children under the age of 18 living with them, 47.99% were married couples living together, 17.22% had a female householder with no husband present, and 28.94% were non-families. 26.74% of all households were made up of individuals, and 12.82% had someone living alone who was 65 years of age or older. The average household size was 3.08 and the average family size was 2.56.

The village's age distribution consisted of 29.8% under the age of 18, 3.0% from 18 to 24, 17.7% from 25 to 44, 26.1% from 45 to 64, and 23.6% who were 65 years of age or older. The median age was 44.8 years. For every 100 females, there were 89.9 males. For every 100 females age 18 and over, there were 83.9 males.

The median income for a household in the village was $50,038, and the median income for a family was $55,000. Males had a median income of $41,196 versus $24,167 for females. The per capita income for the village was $20,706. About 11.3% of families and 17.7% of the population were below the poverty line, including 30.7% of those under age 18 and 3.6% of those age 65 or over.

== Commerce and transportation ==
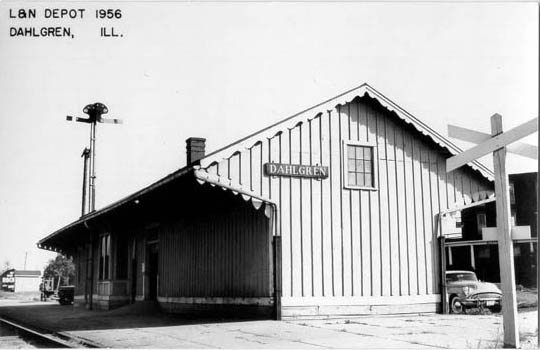
The depot in 1956 looking SE from 3rd St.

Agriculture remains the primary economic activity in the vicinity of Dahlgren. Other business activity includes retail sales and manufacturing, including the manufacture of countertops and fabrication of structural metal components used for data centers and in auto racing.

Dahlgren is located on Illinois Route 142 (formerly U.S. Route 460). The nearest access to the interstate highway system (I-64) is 6.5 miles (10.5 km) to the northwest. The Evansville Western Railway (EVWR) (formerly CSX Transportation) provides freight rail service to Dahlgren. CSX divested 120 miles (200 km) of rail line (from Howell Yard in Evansville, Indiana, to Okawville, Illinois) to the Paducah and Louisville Railway (PAL), an operating entity of Four Rivers Transportation, Inc. This was a transaction whereby CSX sold all track, ties and track equipment to PAL and provided a 20-year lease on the right-of-way. Upon completion of the sale on December 31, 2005, PAL transferred all interests to the new Class III operating entity/subsidiary, EVWR, which began operating on January 1, 2006. CSX (formerly the Louisville & Nashville R.R.) retains title to all real estate on which the railroad is situated.

Dahlgren has no passenger services. The nearest airports providing service are Marion Williamson County Regional Airport (MWA), Evansville Dress Regional Airport (EVV) and Lambert-Saint Louis International Airport (STL). The nearest passenger rail connection (Amtrak) is in Centralia, Illinois. Interstate bus service is available in Mount Vernon, Illinois, 15 miles (24 km) to the northwest.

== Media and communication ==
The Dahlgren post office provides service to more than 1,500 customers in the 62828 postal (ZIP) code. Dahlgren has had no locally published newspaper since the cessation of publication of The Dahlgren Echo many years ago. There is no current newspaper of record as the weekly McLeansboro Times-Leader formerly published in the county seat folded in 2018. Other daily newspapers available for home delivery in the area include The Morning Sentinel (Centralia) and The Southern Illinoisan (regional print newspaper).

Dahlgren is in the Harrisburg, IL / Cape Girardeau, MO / Paducah, KY television Designated Market Area (DMA), the 90th largest television market in 2025 as defined by Nielsen Media Research; the market comprises 378,500 TV homes. Residents receive over-the-air reception of the following digital broadcast channels from networks and other affiliates:

- ABC (WSIL) — 3.1 HD WSIL ABC, 3.2 SD Heroes and Icons, 3.3 SD True Crime Network, 3.4 SD Court TV & 3.5 SD Ion — RF channel 34
- NBC (WPSD) — 6.1 HD WPSD NBC, 6.2 SD Cozi TV & 6.3 SD Antenna TV — RF channel 19
- PBS (WSIU) — 8.1 HD WSIU PBS, 8.2 SD World Channel, 8.3 SD Create, 8.4 SD PBS Kids 24/7, & 8.5 WSIU FM — RF channel 8 (WSIU also uses RF channel 28 in some locations)
- CBS (KFVS) — 12.1 HD KFVH CBS, 12.2 HD CW, 12.3 SD Outlaw, 12.4 SD Me-TV, 12.5 SD Grit, 12.6 SD Oxygen & 12.7 SD 365BLK, — RF channel 11
- 3ABN (3ABN) — 15.1 SD 3ABN, 15.2 SD 3ABN Proclaim, 15.3 SD 3ABN Dare to Dream, 15.4 SD 3ABN Latino, & 15.5 SD 3ABN Kids — RF channel 15
- PBS (WUSI) — 16.1 HD WUSI PBS, 16.2 World Channel, 16.3 Create, 16.4 SD PBS Kids 24/7, & 16.5 WSIU FM — RF channel 23 (This station is in the Terre Haute DMA, but can be tuned from Dahlgren)
- FOX (KBSI) — 23.1 HD KBSI FOX, 23.2 HD WDKA MyN 49 (WDKA), 23.3 SD Comet TV, 23.4 SD Ion Plus, 23.5 SD Bounce TV, & 23.6 Scripps News — RF channel 36
- TCT (WTCT) — 27.1 HD WTCT TCT, 27.2 SD SonLife, 27.3 SD Positiv, 27.4 SD Laff, 27.5 SD Start TV, 27.6 SD Story Television, 27.7 SD Quest, 27.8 SD BUZZR, 27.9 SD Biz TV, 27.10 SD Shop LC, & 26.11 West — RF channel 30
- MyN (WDKA) — 49.1 HD WDKA MyN, 49.2 SD Charge!, 49.3 SD ROAR, & 49.4 SD The Nest, 49.5 SD Dabl, 49.6 Court TV, & 49.7 CHSN [Blank] — RF channel 25

Since the digital television transition of 2009 there have been many ownership and affiliation changes in television markets. The Harrisburg, IL / Cape Girardeau, MO / Paducah, KY DMA has been no exception. In 2019 major players include Sinclair, Paxton Media Group, Raycom Media, Quincy Media, and the University of Southern Illinois. WPXS (Daystar), licensed to Mt. Vernon, moved its transmitter northwest of Breese, IL in the St. Louis, MO DMA and is no longer available over-the-air in Dahlgren. Viewers with a rotator and suitably elevated antenna can also receive virtually all over-the-air broadcasts from Evansville, Indiana.

Cable television service (analog), previously available from Longview Communication, was terminated in 2006. Hamilton County Communications (a wholly controlled subsidiary of the Hamilton County Telephone Cooperative - HCTC) acquired the cable-operating rights upon Longview's demise and operated an IPTV-based television service under the Futiva brand until 2019 when HCC exited the business.

Mobile telephony services are provided by ATT (formerly Cingular), Verizon, and T-Mobile (since 2025). At one time 6 providers offered cellphone coverage, either directly or through roaming agreements. This included First Cellular of Southern Illinois (which HCTC co-owned) and AllTel.

Local copper wireline telephone and DSL service is available through the Hamilton County Telephone Cooperative (and/or Hamilton County Communications under the Futiva brand). Wireless broadband service is provided by all mobile providers. Mid-speed satellite broadband service is available from Starlink, ViaSat/Exede and other providers.

== Government and schools ==
Dahlgren operates under the Illinois trustee-village form of government. Leadership includes the Village President and a six-member Board of Trustees that together act as the legislative body. Trustees and the President are elected at-large on a nonpartisan basis to staggered four-year terms. The Village Clerk is also elected, while the Treasurer is appointed. Steve Wilkerson was re-elected village president in 2025.

The village owns and operates its own municipal utility system that provides bundled services to residents, including water, sewer, and natural gas. It contracts with a third-party vendor to provide refuse removal that is also billed by the village.

Dahlgren is located within the Hamilton County Unit 10 school district. Elementary-age children attend Dahlgren Grade School through sixth grade. Junior high school and high school students travel to the county seat of McLeansboro, where a new combined school complex was completed in 2001. Dahlgren is also in Community College District #521 (Rend Lake College, located Ina, Illinois) as established by the Illinois Board of Higher Education. However, university and college-age students are not restricted to attending in their local community college district.
