= Dahlgren Township =

Dahlgren Township may refer to the following townships in the United States:

- Dahlgren Township, Hamilton County, Illinois
- Dahlgren Township, Carver County, Minnesota
