= Nate Johnson (tackle) =

American football player (1920–2004)

- Johnson, c. 1949

Profile
- Position: Tackle

Personal information
- Born: June 18, 1920; Dale, Illinois, U.S.
- Died: August 24, 2004 (aged 84); Freeport, Illinois, U.S.
- Listed height: 6 ft 4 in (1.93 m)
- Listed weight: 244 lb (111 kg)

Career information
- High school: Benton (IL)
- College: Illinois

Career history
- New York Yankees (1946-1947); Chicago Rockets/Hornets (1948–1949); New York Yanks (1950)
- Stats at Pro Football Reference

Nathan Elijah Johnson (June 19, 1920 – August 24, 2004) was an American football tackle.

Johnson was born in Dale, Illinois in 1920 and attended Benton High School in Benton, Illinois. He played college football at Illinois. He was selected as the most valuable player on the 1941 Illinois Fighting Illini football team.

He played professional football in the All-America Football Conference for the New York Yankees in 1946 and 1947 and the Chicago Rockets/Hornets in 1947 and 1948. He was traded by the Yankees to the Rockets in May 1948 in exchange for fullback Bill Daley. When the AAFC disbanded, he played in the National Football League for the New York Yanks in 1950. He appeared in 65 professional football games, 49 of them as a starter.

He died in 2004 in Freeport, Illinois.
