= Mayberry, Illinois =

- Unincorporated community
- Location within Illinois Location within the United States
- Coordinates: 38°16′14″N 88°32′55″W
- Country: United States
- State: Illinois
- County: Wayne
- Elevation: 453 ft (138 m)
- Time zone: UTC-6 (Central (CST))
  - Summer (DST): UTC-5 (CDT)
- Area code: 618
- GNIS feature ID: 422953

Mayberry is an unincorporated community in Wayne County, Illinois, United States. Mayberry is located at the junction of Interstate 64 and Illinois Route 242 3.5 miles (5.6 km) north of Belle Prairie City.
