= Elwood Barker =

American politician (1878–1953)

Elwood Barker (October 21, 1878 – April 28, 1953) was an American politician.

== Background ==
Barker born in Hamilton County, Illinois. He went to the public schools and to Southern Illinois University Carbondale in Carbondale, Illinois. Barker taught school and was a businessman and farmer. He lived in McLeansboro, Illinois with his wife and family. Barker served as sheriff and county treasurer of Hamilton County, Illinois. He also served on the Hamilton County Board and served as postmaster. Barker served in the Illinois House of Representatives from 1911 to 1915 and was a Republican. Barker died at Vickers Memorial Hospital in McLeansboro, Illinois after being ill for two years.
