= Dorothea Mierisch =

20th century American decorator, lithographer, and painter

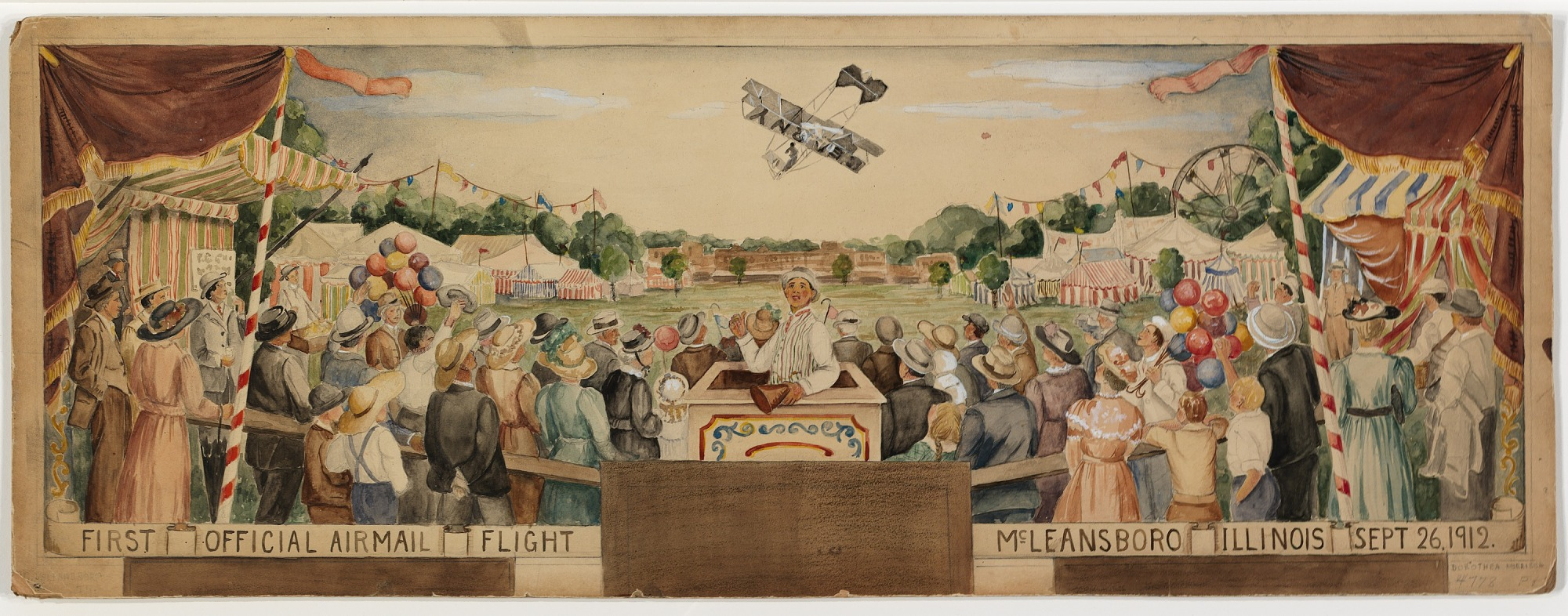
Study for The First Official Airmail Flight (1941), mural for the post office at McLeansboro, Illinois

Dorothea Mierisch (1885–1977) was an American artist born in New York City in 1885, and she died in Hopewell, New Jersey in 1977.

She exhibited at the biennials of the Corcoran Gallery of Art in 1930 and 1935, at the Pennsylvania Academy of Fine Arts in 1935 and 1936, the National Association of Women Painters and Sculptors (where she received a prize in 1933), the Montclair Museum (receiving a medal) in 1933, and at the Art Institute of Chicago in 1936.

In 1936, Mierisch participated in the annual exhibition held at the Art Institute of Chicago and presented a painting titled Abandoned Quarry. In 1939, she created a mural for the post office of Bamberg, South Carolina, representing a map of the cotton trade routes in the 19th century. The U. S. Treasury Department's Section of Painting and Sculpture commissioned the work.

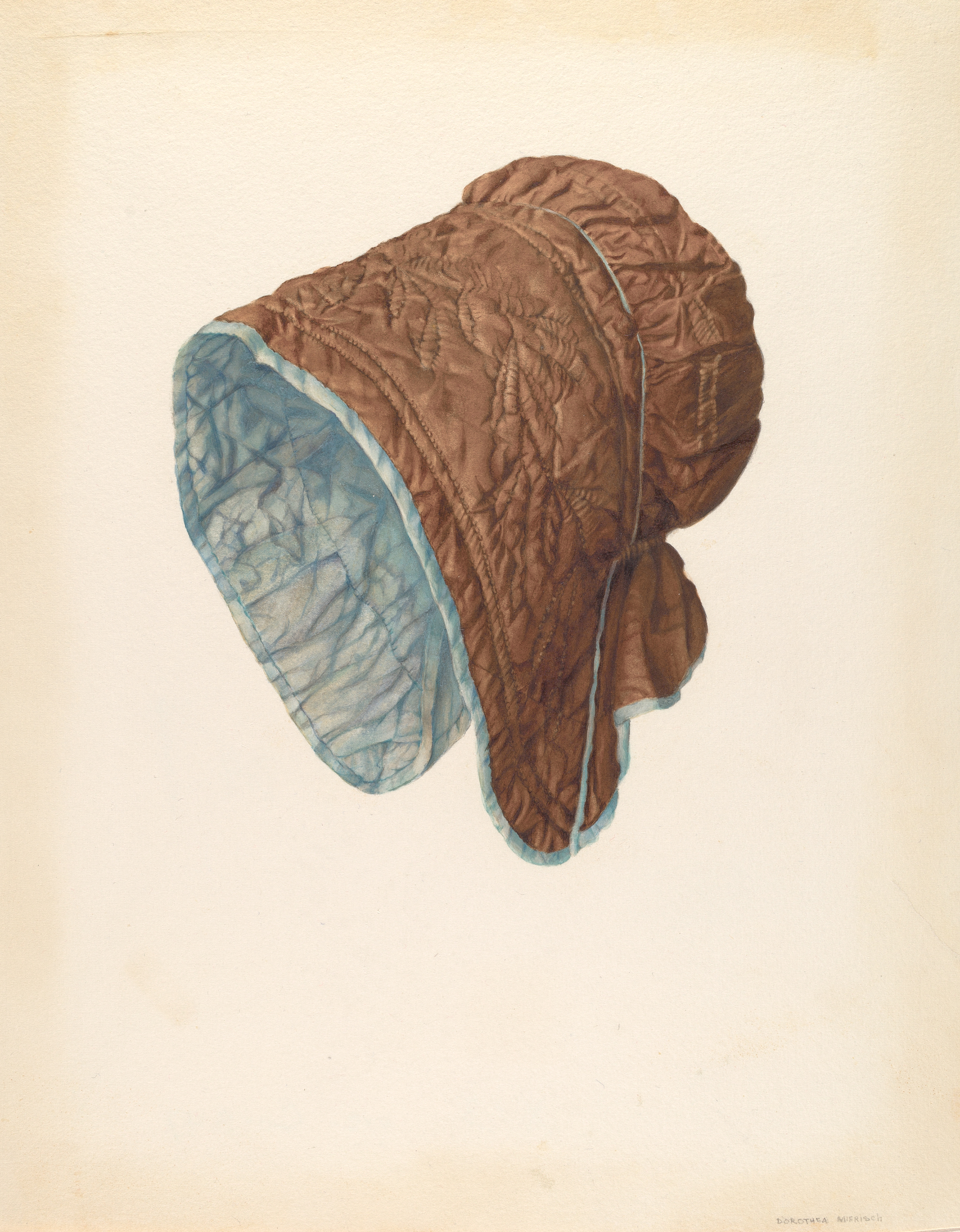
Child's Bonnet, 1938, in the Index of American Design

In 1941, she painted another mural, "The First Official Airmail Flight", at the McLeansboro, Illinois, post office, celebrating a flight that took place in the town on September 26, 1912. A study of this mural is held by the Smithsonian American Art Museum.

The National Gallery of Art in Washington D.C. owns a lithograph by Mierisch, as well as five of her drawings rendering clothes, as part of the Index of American Design.
