= Piopolis, Illinois =

- Unincorporated community
- Location within Illinois Location within the United States
- Coordinates: 38°11′01″N 88°33′41″W
- Country: United States
- State: Illinois
- County: Hamilton
- Elevation: 410 ft (120 m)
- Time zone: UTC-6 (Central (CST))
  - Summer (DST): UTC-5 (CDT)
- Area code: 618
- GNIS feature ID: 415732

Piopolis is an unincorporated community in Hamilton County, Illinois, United States. Piopolis is located in Crouch Township, 2.5 miles (4.0 km) south of Belle Prairie City.

== History ==
Piopolis was settled in 1841 by Roman Catholic immigrants from Ersingen and Bilfingen, Germany. It was known as Auxier Prairie, Dutch Settlement, Mount St. John, St. Francis Xavier, and Belle Prairie before being named Piopolis in 1877 after Pope Pius IX. Piopolis once had a post office, which opened in 1848, and a public school which operated from the 1880s to the 1920s. The community's economy has historically been based on farming.
