= Crouch Township, Hamilton County, Illinois =

Crouch Township
- Township
- Location in Hamilton County

- Hamilton County's location in Illinois
- Coordinates: 38°13′32″N 88°30′03″W
- Country: United States
- State: Illinois
- County: Hamilton
- Established: November 3, 1885

Area
  - Total: 47.37 sq mi (122.7 km^{2})
  - Land: 47.35 sq mi (122.6 km^{2})
  - Water: 0.02 sq mi (0.052 km^{2}) 0.03%
- Elevation: 377 ft (115 m)

Population (2020)
  - Total: 386
  - Density: 8.15/sq mi (3.15/km^{2})
- Time zone: UTC-6 (CST)
  - Summer (DST): UTC-5 (CDT)
- ZIP codes: 62828, 62859, 62895
- FIPS code: 17-065-17809

Crouch Township is one of twelve townships in Hamilton County, Illinois, USA. As of the 2020 census, its population was 386 and it contained 170 housing units.

== Geography ==
According to the 2021 census gazetteer files, Crouch Township has a total area of 47.37 square miles (122.69 km^{2}), of which 47.35 square miles (122.64 km^{2}) (or 99.97%) is land and 0.02 square miles (0.05 km^{2}) (or 0.03%) is water.

=== Cities, towns, villages ===
- Belle Prairie City

=== Unincorporated towns ===
- Aden at 38.241715°N 88.458383°W
- Garrison at 38.248381°N 88.519218°W
- Piopolis at 38.183659°N 88.561442°W

(This list is based on USGS data and may include former settlements.)

=== Cemeteries ===
The township contains these three cemeteries: Crouch, Garrison and Rawls.

=== Major highways ===
- Illinois Route 242

=== Airports and landing strips ===
- Moulton Farms Airport

== Demographics ==
As of the 2020 census there were 386 people, 162 households, and 134 families residing in the township. The population density was 8.15 inhabitants per square mile (3.15/km^{2}). There were 170 housing units at an average density of 3.59 per square mile (1.39/km^{2}). The racial makeup of the township was 97.67% White, 0.00% African American, 0.00% Native American, 0.00% Asian, 0.00% Pacific Islander, 0.00% from other races, and 2.33% from two or more races. Hispanic or Latino of any race were 0.26% of the population.

There were 162 households, out of which 56.80% had children under the age of 18 living with them, 45.06% were married couples living together, 37.65% had a female householder with no spouse present, and 17.28% were non-families. 17.30% of all households were made up of individuals, and 17.30% had someone living alone who was 65 years of age or older. The average household size was 2.88 and the average family size was 3.22.

The township's age distribution consisted of 42.5% under the age of 18, 4.5% from 18 to 24, 21.1% from 25 to 44, 9.6% from 45 to 64, and 22.3% who were 65 years of age or older. The median age was 34.1 years. For every 100 females, there were 95.8 males. For every 100 females age 18 and over, there were 81.1 males.

The median income for a household in the township was $57,143, and the median income for a family was $55,536. Males had a median income of $31,078 versus $48,482 for females. The per capita income for the township was $23,747. About 17.2% of families and 8.8% of the population were below the poverty line, including 7.6% of those under age 18 and 4.8% of those age 65 or over.

Historical population
Census	Pop.	Note	%±
2000	376		—
2010	374		−0.5%
2020	386		3.2%
U.S. Decennial Census

== School districts ==
- Hamilton County Community Unit School District 10
- Norris City-Omaha-Enfield Community Unit School District 3
- Wayne City Community Unit School District 100

== Political districts ==
- Illinois's 19th congressional district
- State House District 108
- State Senate District 54
