= Crook Township, Hamilton County, Illinois =

Crook Township
- Township
- Location in Hamilton County

- Hamilton County's location in Illinois
- Coordinates: 38°04′43″N 88°25′59″W
- Country: United States
- State: Illinois
- County: Hamilton
- Established: November 3, 1885

Area
  - Total: 35.83 sq mi (92.8 km^{2})
  - Land: 35.62 sq mi (92.3 km^{2})
  - Water: 0.20 sq mi (0.52 km^{2}) 0.57%
- Elevation: 469 ft (143 m)

Population (2020)
  - Total: 293
  - Density: 8.23/sq mi (3.18/km^{2})
- Time zone: UTC-6 (CST)
  - Summer (DST): UTC-5 (CDT)
- ZIP codes: 62835, 62859
- FIPS code: 17-065-17627

Crook Township is one of twelve townships in Hamilton County, Illinois, USA. As of the 2020 census, its population was 293 and it contained 146 housing units.

== Geography ==
According to the 2021 census gazetteer files, Crook Township has a total area of 35.83 square miles (92.80 km^{2}), of which 35.62 square miles (92.26 km^{2}) (or 99.43%) is land and 0.20 square miles (0.52 km^{2}) (or 0.57%) is water.

=== Unincorporated towns ===
- Thackeray at 38.120048°N 88.453105°W
- Thurber at 38.082547°N 88.427548°W

(This list is based on USGS data and may include former settlements.)

=== Extinct towns ===
- Jamestown at 38.038936°N 88.374213°W
- Logansport at 38.105881°N 88.423381°W

(These towns are listed as "historical" by the USGS.)

=== Cemeteries ===
The township contains these seven cemeteries: Arterberry, Hopkins, Munsell, New Hope, Old Brush Harbor, Prince and Webb.

=== Major highways ===
- Illinois Route 14

=== Lakes ===
- L P Dolan Lake

== Demographics ==
As of the 2020 census there were 293 people, 117 households, and 39 families residing in the township. The population density was 8.18 inhabitants per square mile (3.16/km^{2}). There were 146 housing units at an average density of 4.08 per square mile (1.58/km^{2}). The racial makeup of the township was 97.27% White, 0.00% African American, 0.34% Native American, 0.00% Asian, 0.00% Pacific Islander, 0.00% from other races, and 2.39% from two or more races. Hispanic or Latino of any race were 0.34% of the population.

There were 117 households, out of which 31.60% had children under the age of 18 living with them, 33.33% were married couples living together, 0.00% had a female householder with no spouse present, and 66.67% were non-families. 42.70% of all households were made up of individuals, and 42.70% had someone living alone who was 65 years of age or older. The average household size was 1.97 and the average family size was 3.00.

The township's age distribution consisted of 11.7% under the age of 18, 10.8% from 18 to 24, 19.5% from 25 to 44, 16.5% from 45 to 64, and 41.6% who were 65 years of age or older. The median age was 54.6 years. For every 100 females, there were 106.3 males. For every 100 females age 18 and over, there were 82.1 males.

The per capita income for the township was $47,222. No families and 6.4% of the population were below the poverty line, including none of those under age 18 and none of those age 65 or over.

Historical population
Census	Pop.	Note	%±
2000	402		—
2010	312		−22.4%
2020	293		−6.1%
U.S. Decennial Census

== School districts ==
- Hamilton County Community Unit School District 10
- Norris City-Omaha-Enfield Community Unit School District 3

== Political districts ==
- Illinois's 19th congressional district
- State House District 117
- State House District 118
- State Senate District 59
