= Hamilton County Courthouse (Illinois) =

Local government building in the United States

Coordinates: 38°5′37″N 88°32′9″W

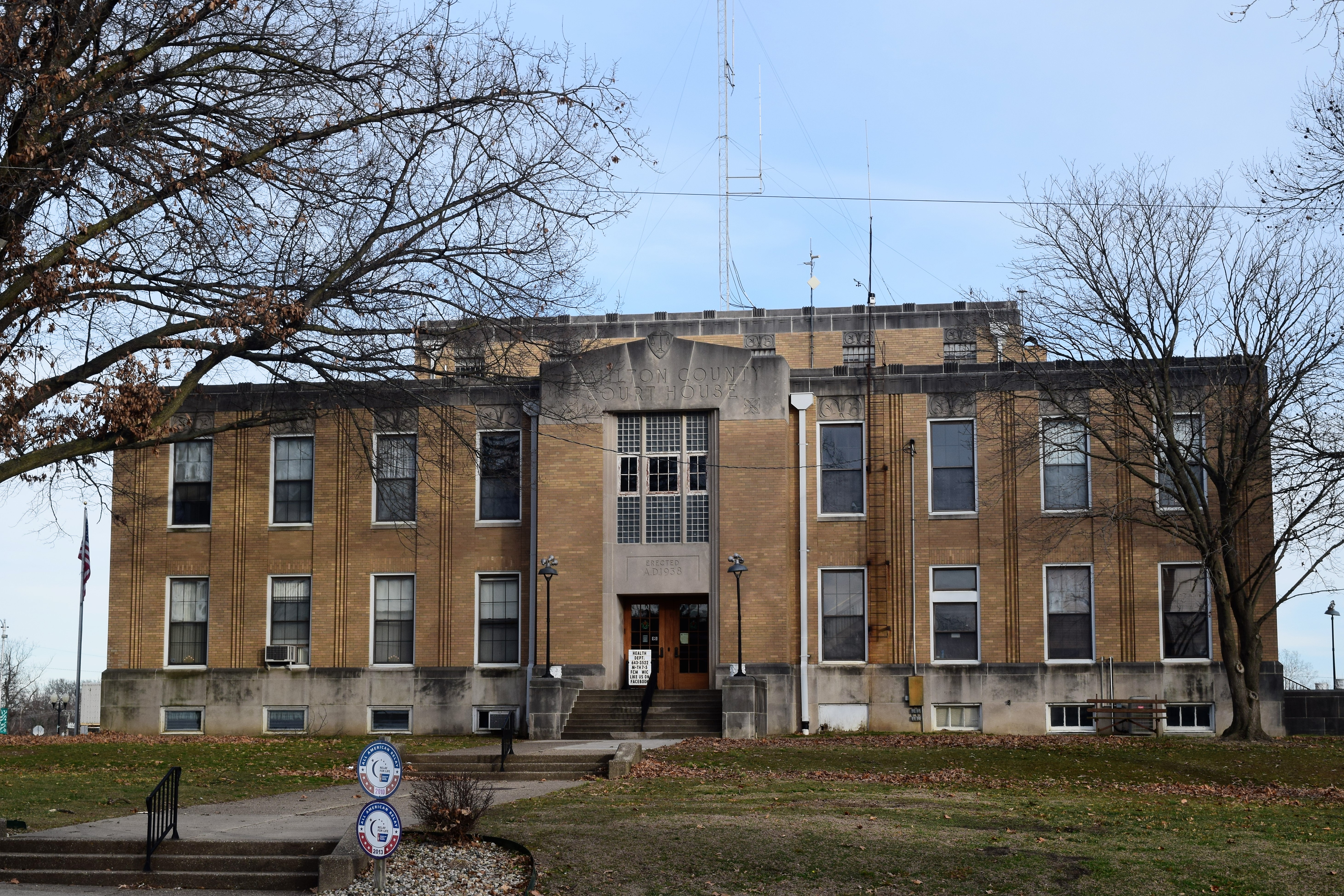
Front of the courthouse

The Hamilton County Courthouse is a government building in McLeansboro, the county seat of Hamilton County, Illinois, United States. Built in 1938, more than forty years after the destruction of the previous courthouse in McLeansboro, it is the third such building to serve the county.

Land was first registered in Hamilton County in 1815, and the law establishing the county was enacted in early 1821. Local officials soon began working to choose a location as the county seat, and they ultimately approved a piece of land donated by one William McLean, for whom the future city was named. Here was built an early courthouse, a log cabin completed by mid-1821. This building remained in use until the completion of a brick replacement in 1840; it remained in use until an 1894 fire. For nearly half a century, the county operated without a courthouse: the public square housed a combined records office and jail, but most county business was accomplished in nearby rented buildings. A weak attempt at building a courthouse saw minimal success, so the advent of the Great Depression saw Hamilton County still functioning without a courthouse. This state of affairs concluded in 1938, when the Public Works Administration erected the present Art Deco brick building. Entrances are placed in the center of each side, flanked by three or four windows on either left or right.
