= Dahlgren Township, Hamilton County, Illinois =

Dahlgren Township
- Township
- Location in Hamilton County

- Hamilton County's location in Illinois
- Coordinates: 38°11′08″N 88°38′29″W
- Country: United States
- State: Illinois
- County: Hamilton
- Established: November 3, 1885

Area
  - Total: 54.38 sq mi (140.8 km^{2})
  - Land: 54.30 sq mi (140.6 km^{2})
  - Water: 0.09 sq mi (0.23 km^{2}) 0.16%
- Elevation: 515 ft (157 m)

Population (2020)
  - Total: 1,137
  - Density: 20.94/sq mi (8.085/km^{2})
- Time zone: UTC-6 (CST)
  - Summer (DST): UTC-5 (CDT)
- ZIP codes: 62828, 62859
- FIPS code: 17-065-18316

Dahlgren Township is one of twelve townships in Hamilton County, Illinois, USA. As of the 2020 census, its population was 1,137 and it contained 511 housing units.

== Geography ==
According to the 2021 census gazetteer files, Dahlgren Township has a total area of 54.38 square miles (140.84 km^{2}), of which 54.30 square miles (140.64 km^{2}) (or 99.84%) is land and 0.09 square miles (0.23 km^{2}) (or 0.16%) is water.

=== Cities, towns, villages ===
- Dahlgren

=== Unincorporated towns ===
- Delafield at 38.147826°N 88.602832°W
- Lovilla at 38.156715°N 88.666724°W

(This list is based on USGS data and may include former settlements.)

=== Cemeteries ===
The township contains these eight cemeteries: Atchison, Bethel, Crisel, Fitzsimons, Independent Order of Oddfellows, Pleasant Hill, Preston and Saint Johns.

=== Major highways ===
- Illinois Route 142

=== Airports and landing strips ===
- Gelfius International Airport

== Demographics ==
As of the 2020 census there were 1,137 people, 488 households, and 393 families residing in the township. The population density was 20.91 inhabitants per square mile (8.07/km^{2}). There were 511 housing units at an average density of 9.40 per square mile (3.63/km^{2}). The racial makeup of the township was 95.78% White, 0.18% African American, 0.00% Native American, 0.18% Asian, 0.00% Pacific Islander, 0.18% from other races, and 3.69% from two or more races. Hispanic or Latino of any race were 0.79% of the population.

There were 488 households, out of which 34.40% had children under the age of 18 living with them, 57.58% were married couples living together, 14.34% had a female householder with no spouse present, and 19.47% were non-families. 18.20% of all households were made up of individuals, and 10.50% had someone living alone who was 65 years of age or older. The average household size was 2.58 and the average family size was 2.91.

The township's age distribution consisted of 27.2% under the age of 18, 4.8% from 18 to 24, 18.1% from 25 to 44, 32.2% from 45 to 64, and 17.5% who were 65 years of age or older. The median age was 44.8 years. For every 100 females, there were 85.7 males. For every 100 females age 18 and over, there were 93.7 males.

The median income for a household in the township was $57,222, and the median income for a family was $72,898. Males had a median income of $66,364 versus $35,208 for females. The per capita income for the township was $26,363. About 5.6% of families and 9.8% of the population were below the poverty line, including 18.5% of those under age 18 and 2.7% of those age 65 or over.

Historical population
| Census | Pop. | Note | %± |
|---|---|---|---|
| 2000 | 1,220 | | — |
| 2010 | 1,220 | | 0.0% |
| 2020 | 1,137 | | −6.8% |
U.S. Decennial Census

== School districts ==
- Hamilton County Community Unit School District 10

== Political districts ==
- Illinois's 19th congressional district
- State House District 108
- State Senate District 54
