= Flannigan Township, Hamilton County, Illinois =

Flannigan Township
- Township
- Location in Hamilton County

- Hamilton County's location in Illinois
- Coordinates: 37°59′44″N 88°38′56″W
- Country: United States
- State: Illinois
- County: Hamilton
- Established: November 3, 1885

Area
  - Total: 36.36 sq mi (94.2 km^{2})
  - Land: 36.20 sq mi (93.8 km^{2})
  - Water: 0.16 sq mi (0.41 km^{2}) 0.44%
- Elevation: 551 ft (168 m)

Population (2020)
  - Total: 291
  - Density: 8.04/sq mi (3.10/km^{2})
- Time zone: UTC-6 (CST)
  - Summer (DST): UTC-5 (CDT)
- ZIP codes: 62859, 62860, 62890
- FIPS code: 17-065-26324

Flannigan Township is one of twelve townships in Hamilton County, Illinois, USA. As of the 2020 census, its population was 291 and it contained 166 housing units.

== Geography ==
According to the 2021 census gazetteer files, Flannigan Township has a total area of 36.36 square miles (94.17 km^{2}), of which 36.20 square miles (93.76 km^{2}) (or 99.56%) is land and 0.16 square miles (0.41 km^{2}) (or 0.44%) is water.

=== Unincorporated towns ===
- Braden at 37.996437°N 88.616166°W
- Rural Hill at 37.960604°N 88.651168°W
- Tuckers Corners at 37.990881°N 88.59561°W
- West Rural Hill at 37.965604°N 88.688391°W

(This list is based on USGS data and may include former settlements.)

=== Cemeteries ===
The township contains these four cemeteries: Cartwright, Little Springs, Knights Prairie and Lampley. Several Revolutionary War veterans are buried at Little Springs. Cartwright cemetery is named after Methodist evangelist and Illinois statesman Peter Cartwright.

== Demographics ==
As of the 2020 census there were 291 people, 30 households, and 21 families residing in the township. The population density was 8.00 inhabitants per square mile (3.09/km^{2}). There were 166 housing units at an average density of 4.57 per square mile (1.76/km^{2}). The racial makeup of the township was 96.91% White, 0.00% African American, 0.34% Native American, 0.34% Asian, 0.00% Pacific Islander, 0.00% from other races, and 2.41% from two or more races. Hispanic or Latino of any race were 0.34% of the population.

There were 30 households, none of which had children under the age of 18 living with them, 70.00% were married couples living together, none had a female householder with no spouse present, and 30.00% were non-families. 30.00% of all households were made up of individuals, and 30.00% had someone living alone who was 65 years of age or older. The average household size was 1.90 and the average family size was 2.29.

The township's age distribution consisted of 0.0% under the age of 18, 0.0% from 18 to 24, 0% from 25 to 44, 36.8% from 45 to 64, and 63.2% who were 65 years of age or older. The median age was 75.8 years. For every 100 females, there were 111.1 males. For every 100 females age 18 and over, there were 111.1 males.

The median income for a household in the township was $54,000. The per capita income for the township was $23,646. No families and 15.8% of the population were below the poverty line, including 25.0% of those age 65 or over.

Historical population
Census	Pop.	Note	%±
2000	290		—
2010	304		4.8%
2020	291		−4.3%
U.S. Decennial Census

== School districts ==
- Hamilton County Community Unit School District 10

== Political districts ==
- Illinois's 19th congressional district
- State House District 117
- State Senate District 59
