= Beaver Creek Township, Illinois =

Beaver Creek Township
- Township
- Location in Hamilton County

- Hamilton County's location in Illinois
- Coordinates: 38°10′21″N 88°25′37″W
- Country: United States
- State: Illinois
- County: Hamilton
- Established: November 3, 1885

Area
  - Total: 36.54 sq mi (94.6 km^{2})
  - Land: 36.53 sq mi (94.6 km^{2})
  - Water: 0.01 sq mi (0.026 km^{2}) 0.04%
- Elevation: 410 ft (125 m)

Population (2020)
  - Total: 274
  - Density: 7.50/sq mi (2.90/km^{2})
- Time zone: UTC-6 (CST)
  - Summer (DST): UTC-5 (CDT)
- ZIP codes: 62828, 62835, 62859, 62887
- FIPS code: 17-065-04481

Beaver Creek Township is one of twelve townships in Hamilton County, Illinois, USA. As of the 2020 census, its population was 274 and it contained 109 housing units.

== Geography ==
According to the 2021 census gazetteer files, Beaver Creek Township has a total area of 36.54 square miles (94.64 km^{2}), of which 36.53 square miles (94.61 km^{2}) (or 99.96%) is land and 0.01 square miles (0.03 km^{2}) (or 0.04%) is water.

=== Unincorporated towns ===
- Blairsville at 38.168381°N 88.464216°W
- Bungay at 38.179214°N 88.408659°W

(This list is based on USGS data and may include former settlements.)

=== Extinct towns ===
- Jefferson City at 38.150325°N 88.461716°W
- New London at 38.168381°N 88.405603°W

(These towns are listed as "historical" by the USGS.)

=== Cemeteries ===
The township contains Springer Cemetery.

== Demographics ==
As of the 2020 census there were 274 people, 119 households, and 119 families residing in the township. The population density was 7.50 inhabitants per square mile (2.90/km^{2}). There were 109 housing units at an average density of 2.98 per square mile (1.15/km^{2}). The racial makeup of the township was 94.53% White, 0.73% African American, 0.36% Native American, 0.00% Asian, 0.00% Pacific Islander, 0.00% from other races, and 4.38% from two or more races. Hispanic or Latino of any race were 0.00% of the population.

There were 119 households, out of which 38.70% had children under the age of 18 living with them, 100.00% were married couples living together, none had a female householder with no spouse present, and none were non-families. No households were made up of individuals. The average household size was 2.78 and the average family size was 2.78.

The township's age distribution consisted of 16.9% under the age of 18, 11.2% from 18 to 24, 17.2% from 25 to 44, 31.1% from 45 to 64, and 23.6% who were 65 years of age or older. The median age was 51.3 years. For every 100 females, there were 128.3 males. For every 100 females age 18 and over, there were 131.1 males.

The median income for a household in the township was $56,927, and the median income for a family was $56,927. Males had a median income of $46,250 versus $50,735 for females. The per capita income for the township was $32,116. About 13.4% of families and 8.5% of the population were below the poverty line, including none of those under age 18 and none of those age 65 or over.

Historical population
Census	Pop.	Note	%±
2000	283		—
2010	271		−4.2%
2020	274		1.1%
U.S. Decennial Census

== School districts ==
- Hamilton County Community Unit School District 10
- Norris City-Omaha-Enfield Community Unit School District 3

== Political districts ==
- Illinois's 19th congressional district
- State House District 108
- State Senate District 54
