= South Crouch Township, Hamilton County, Illinois =

South Crouch Township
- Township
- Location in Hamilton County

- Hamilton County's location in Illinois
- Coordinates: 38°09′24″N 88°31′33″W
- Country: United States
- State: Illinois
- County: Hamilton
- Established: November 3, 1885

Area
  - Total: 25.17 sq mi (65.2 km^{2})
  - Land: 25.17 sq mi (65.2 km^{2})
  - Water: 0.01 sq mi (0.026 km^{2}) 0.03%
- Elevation: 404 ft (123 m)

Population (2020)
  - Total: 202
  - Density: 8.03/sq mi (3.10/km^{2})
- Time zone: UTC-6 (CST)
  - Summer (DST): UTC-5 (CDT)
- ZIP codes: 62828, 62859
- FIPS code: 17-065-70655

South Crouch Township is one of twelve townships in Hamilton County, Illinois, USA. As of the 2020 census, its population was 202 and it contained 94 housing units. It was formed from Crouch Township sometime after 1921. As of 2019 the Precinct Committeemen are: Michael Joseph Little, Republican Party, and Troy Rubenacker, Democratic Party.

== Geography ==
According to the 2021 census gazetteer files, South Crouch Township has a total area of 25.17 square miles (65.19 km^{2}), of which 25.17 square miles (65.19 km^{2}) (or 99.97%) is land and 0.01 square miles (0.03 km^{2}) (or 0.03%) is water.

=== Cemeteries ===
South Crouch Township contains Cherry Grove Cemetery and Blooming Grove Cemetery.

== Demographics ==
As of the 2020 census there were 202 people, 142 households, and 94 families residing in the township. The population density was 8.02 inhabitants per square mile (3.10/km^{2}). There were 94 housing units at an average density of 3.73 per square mile (1.44/km^{2}). The racial makeup of the township was 94.55% White, 0.00% African American, 0.00% Native American, 0.00% Asian, 0.00% Pacific Islander, 0.00% from other races, and 5.45% from two or more races. Hispanic or Latino of any race were 1.49% of the population.

There were 142 households, out of which 32.40% had children under the age of 18 living with them, 61.97% were married couples living together, none had a female householder with no spouse present, and 33.80% were non-families. 26.10% of all households were made up of individuals, and 0.00% had someone living alone who was 65 years of age or older. The average household size was 2.82 and the average family size was 3.64.

The township's age distribution consisted of 23.4% under the age of 18, 15.2% from 18 to 24, 20.6% from 25 to 44, 21.9% from 45 to 64, and 18.7% who were 65 years of age or older. The median age was 38.3 years. For every 100 females, there were 88.3 males. For every 100 females age 18 and over, there were 93.1 males.

The median income for a household in the township was $90,761, and the median income for a family was $101,333. Males had a median income of $48,958 versus $41,406 for females. The per capita income for the township was $26,326. No of families and about 2.7% of the population were below the poverty line, including none of those under age 18 and 14.7% of those age 65 or over.

Historical population
Census	Pop.	Note	%±
2000	249		—
2010	260		4.4%
2020	202		−22.3%
U.S. Decennial Census

== School districts ==
- Hamilton County Community Unit School District 10

== Political districts ==
- Illinois's 19th congressional district
- State House District 108
- State Senate District 54
