= Blairsville, Hamilton County, Illinois =

Blairsville, Illinois
- Unincorporated community
- Location within Illinois Location within the United States
- Coordinates: 38°10′06″N 88°27′51″W
- Country: United States
- State: Illinois
- County: Hamilton
- Elevation: 384 ft (117 m)
- Time zone: UTC-6 (Central (CST))
  - Summer (DST): UTC-5 (CDT)
- Area code: 618
- GNIS feature ID: 404546

Blairsville is an unincorporated community in Beaver Creek Township, Hamilton County, Illinois, United States. The community is located along County Route 10 6.5 miles (10.5 km) northeast of McLeansboro.
