= Tuckers Corners, Illinois =

- Unincorporated community
- Location within Illinois Location within the United States
- Coordinates: 37°59′27″N 88°35′44″W
- Country: United States
- State: Illinois
- County: Hamilton
- Elevation: 440 ft (130 m)
- Time zone: UTC-6 (Central (CST))
  - Summer (DST): UTC-5 (CDT)
- Area code: 618
- GNIS feature ID: 423256

Tuckers Corners is an unincorporated community in Flannigan Township, Hamilton County, Illinois, United States.
