= Braden, Illinois =

- Unincorporated community
- Location within Illinois Location within the United States
- Coordinates: 37°59′47″N 88°36′58″W
- Country: United States
- State: Illinois
- County: Hamilton
- Elevation: 453 ft (138 m)
- Time zone: UTC-6 (Central (CST))
  - Summer (DST): UTC-5 (CDT)
- Area code: 618
- GNIS feature ID: 422495

Braden is an unincorporated community in Flannigan Township, Hamilton County, Illinois, United States.
