= Twigg Township, Hamilton County, Illinois =

Twigg Township
- Township
- Location in Hamilton County

- Hamilton County's location in Illinois
- Coordinates: 37°59′43″N 88°32′26″W
- Country: United States
- State: Illinois
- County: Hamilton
- Established: November 3, 1885

Area
  - Total: 36.40 sq mi (94.3 km^{2})
  - Land: 36.30 sq mi (94.0 km^{2})
  - Water: 0.10 sq mi (0.26 km^{2}) 0.27%
- Elevation: 377 ft (115 m)

Population (2020)
  - Total: 488
  - Density: 13.4/sq mi (5.19/km^{2})
- Time zone: UTC-6 (CST)
  - Summer (DST): UTC-5 (CDT)
- ZIP codes: 62817, 62829, 62859
- FIPS code: 17-065-76472

Twigg Township is one of twelve townships in Hamilton County, Illinois, USA. As of the 2020 census, its population was 488 and it contained 208 housing units.

== Geography ==
According to the 2021 census gazetteer files, Twigg Township has a total area of 36.40 square miles (94.28 km^{2}), of which 36.30 square miles (94.02 km^{2}) (or 99.73%) is land and 0.10 square miles (0.26 km^{2}) (or 0.27%) is water.

=== Unincorporated towns ===
- Dale at 37.995047°N 88.491717°W
- Olga at 37.991437°N 88.576998°W

(This list is based on USGS data and may include former settlements.)

=== Cemeteries ===
The township contains these four cemeteries: Digby, Marys Chapel, Smith and Mt. Olive.

== Demographics ==
As of the 2020 census there were 488 people, 174 households, and 141 families residing in the township. The population density was 13.41 inhabitants per square mile (5.18/km^{2}). There were 208 housing units at an average density of 5.71 per square mile (2.20/km^{2}). The racial makeup of the township was 96.72% White, 0.00% African American, 0.41% Native American, 0.00% Asian, 0.00% Pacific Islander, 0.00% from other races, and 2.87% from two or more races. Hispanic or Latino of any race were 0.00% of the population.

There were 174 households, out of which 47.10% had children under the age of 18 living with them, 57.47% were married couples living together, 0.00% had a female householder with no spouse present, and 18.97% were non-families. 19.00% of all households were made up of individuals, and 1.10% had someone living alone who was 65 years of age or older. The average household size was 3.67 and the average family size was 4.30.

The township's age distribution consisted of 47.1% under the age of 18, 2.7% from 18 to 24, 24.1% from 25 to 44, 15.8% from 45 to 64, and 10.3% who were 65 years of age or older. The median age was 28.0 years. For every 100 females, there were 181.5 males. For every 100 females age 18 and over, there were 160.0 males.

The median income for a household in the township was $28,629. The per capita income for the township was $11,450. About 29.1% of families and 48.5% of the population were below the poverty line, including 75.1% of those under age 18 and 3.0% of those age 65 or over.

Historical population
Census	Pop.	Note	%±
2000	532		—
2010	578		8.6%
2020	488		−15.6%
U.S. Decennial Census

== School districts ==
- Hamilton County Community Unit School District 10

== Political districts ==
- Illinois's 19th congressional district
- State House District 118
- State Senate District 59
