= Mayberry Township, Hamilton County, Illinois =

Township in the United States

Mayberry Township
- Township
- Location in Hamilton County

- Hamilton County's location in Illinois
- Coordinates: 37°58′43″N 88°25′47″W
- Country: United States
- State: Illinois
- County: Hamilton
- Established: November 3, 1885

Area
  - Total: 54.77 sq mi (141.9 km^{2})
  - Land: 54.62 sq mi (141.5 km^{2})
  - Water: 0.15 sq mi (0.39 km^{2}) 0.28%
- Elevation: 364 ft (111 m)

Population (2020)
  - Total: 450
  - Density: 8.2/sq mi (3.2/km^{2})
- Time zone: UTC-6 (CST)
  - Summer (DST): UTC-5 (CDT)
- ZIP codes: 62817, 62829, 62859
- FIPS code: 17-065-47657

Mayberry Township is one of twelve townships in Hamilton County, Illinois, USA. As of the 2020 census, its population was 450 and it contained 222 housing units.

== Geography ==
According to the 2021 census gazetteer files, Mayberry Township has a total area of 54.77 square miles (141.85 km^{2}), of which 54.62 square miles (141.47 km^{2}) (or 99.72%) is land and 0.15 square miles (0.39 km^{2}) (or 0.28%) is water.

=== Cities, towns, villages ===
- Broughton

=== Unincorporated towns ===
- Nipper Corner at 38.038659°N 88.470327°W

(This list is based on USGS data and may include former settlements.)

=== Extinct towns ===
- Rectorville at 37.921714°N 88.457826°W

(These towns are listed as "historical" by the USGS.)

=== Cemeteries ===
The township contains these ten cemeteries: Albion, Big Hill, Clark, Cook, Gholson, Keasler, Lantham, Morris, New Prospect and Wolfe.

== Demographics ==
As of the 2020 census there were 450 people, 298 households, and 266 families residing in the township. The population density was 8.22 inhabitants per square mile (3.17/km^{2}). There were 222 housing units at an average density of 4.05 per square mile (1.56/km^{2}). The racial makeup of the township was 93.78% White, 1.11% African American, 0.00% Native American, 0.00% Asian, 0.00% Pacific Islander, 0.22% from other races, and 4.89% from two or more races. Hispanic or Latino of any race were 1.11% of the population.

There were 298 households, out of which 5.00% had children under the age of 18 living with them, 69.46% were married couples living together, 12.08% had a female householder with no spouse present, and 10.74% were non-families. 10.40% of all households were made up of individuals, and 8.40% had someone living alone who was 65 years of age or older. The average household size was 1.97 and the average family size was 2.02.

The township's age distribution consisted of 2.4% under the age of 18, 11.2% from 18 to 24, 16% from 25 to 44, 57.4% from 45 to 64, and 12.9% who were 65 years of age or older. The median age was 59.1 years. For every 100 females, there were 91.2 males. For every 100 females age 18 and over, there were 87.3 males.

The median income for a household in the township was $-666,666,666, and the median income for a family was $135,519. Males had a median income of $56,818 versus $39,643 for females. The per capita income for the township was $42,667. About 3.4% of families and 5.5% of the population were below the poverty line, including 14.3% of those under age 18 and none of those age 65 or over.

Historical population
Census	Pop.	Note	%±
2000	518		—
2010	486		−6.2%
2020	450		−7.4%
U.S. Decennial Census

== School districts ==
- Eldorado Community Unit School District 4
- Hamilton County Community Unit School District 10
- Norris City-Omaha-Enfield Community Unit School District 3

== Political districts ==
- Illinois's 15th congressional district
- State House District 118
- State Senate District 59
