= Thompsonville Community Unit School District 174 =

School district in Southern Illinois, United States

Location
- Thompsonville, Illinois United States

District information
- Type: Community unit school district
- Grades: Pre-K – 12
- Established: July 1, 2007
- Schools: 2
- NCES District ID: 1701382

Students and staff
- Students: 352 (2012–2013)
- Student–teacher ratio: 13:1 (2012–2013)

Other information
- Schedule: 175 days/year (2012–2013)
- Website: www.tvilleschools.org

Thompsonville Community Unit School District 174 is a public unit school district in southeastern Franklin County and a smaller portion of Hamilton County, Illinois. It was formed in 2007 by the consolidation of Thompsonville School District 62 and Thompsonville Community High School District 112.

For the 2012–2013 school year, the district provided 175 school days of instruction, had a 13:1 student–teacher ratio, and spent $5,152 per student counting only instructional spending, or $8,871 per student counting all operational spending.

== History ==
Thompsonville School District 62 was a grade school district.

The district of one-room Old Cantrell School was annexed by Thompsonville in 1957. When Logan Community Consolidated School District 110 was dissolved in 2005, part of its territory was annexed to District 62.

Thompsonville Community High School District 112 was a high school district.

Since at least 2002, District 62 and District 112 shared a superintendent and a principal, and were mostly in the same building. They also shared transportation. A reorganization study in the early 2000s, sponsored by a $4,500 Illinois State Board of Education grant, found that the two districts were not eligible to consolidate under the state laws at that time.

School district consolidation was passed by referendum in the April 17, 2007 Illinois consolidated election, on the question "Shall Thompsonville Grade School District 62 and Thompsonville Community High School District 112 establish a Community School District?" It was the only consolidation on the April 2007 ballot in Illinois. The tax referendum for the new district also passed in the same election, on the question "Shall a unit district levy taxes at the rate of Education Fund 2.00%, Operations/Maintenance 0.05%, Transportation 0.24%, etc., each upon all of the taxable property of the district?" The consolidation took effect on July 1, 2007.
