= McLeansboro Township, Hamilton County, Illinois =

McLeansboro Township
- Township
- Location in Hamilton County

- Hamilton County's location in Illinois
- Coordinates: 38°04′52″N 88°32′27″W
- Country: United States
- State: Illinois
- County: Hamilton
- Established: November 3, 1885

Area
  - Total: 35.90 sq mi (93.0 km^{2})
  - Land: 35.58 sq mi (92.2 km^{2})
  - Water: 0.32 sq mi (0.83 km^{2}) 0.89%
- Elevation: 446 ft (136 m)

Population (2020)
  - Total: 3,650
  - Density: 103/sq mi (39.6/km^{2})
- Time zone: UTC-6 (CST)
  - Summer (DST): UTC-5 (CDT)
- ZIP code: 62859
- FIPS code: 17-065-45837
- Website: www.mcleansborotownship.com

McLeansboro Township is one of twelve townships in Hamilton County, Illinois, USA. As of the 2020 census, its population was 3,650 and it contained 1,803 housing units.

== Geography ==
According to the 2021 census gazetteer files, McLeansboro Township has a total area of 35.90 square miles (92.98 km^{2}), of which 35.58 square miles (92.15 km^{2}) (or 99.11%) is land and 0.32 square miles (0.83 km^{2}) (or 0.89%) is water.

=== Cities, towns, villages ===
- McLeansboro

=== Unincorporated towns ===
- Diamond City at 38.089215°N 88.552553°W
- Hoodville at 38.049214°N 88.527274°W

(This list is based on USGS data and may include former settlements.)

=== Cemeteries ===
The township contains these seven cemeteries: Concord, Crisel, Glenview Memorial Gardens, Hutson, Independent Order of Oddfellows, Presley and Union Hill.

=== Airports and landing strips ===
- McLeansboro Airport

== Demographics ==
As of the 2020 census there were 3,650 people, 1,567 households, and 973 families residing in the township. The population density was 101.67 inhabitants per square mile (39.26/km^{2}). There were 1,803 housing units at an average density of 50.22 per square mile (19.39/km^{2}). The racial makeup of the township was 94.77% White, 0.79% African American, 0.27% Native American, 0.19% Asian, 0.00% Pacific Islander, 0.47% from other races, and 3.51% from two or more races. Hispanic or Latino of any race were 1.70% of the population.

There were 1,567 households, out of which 27.60% had children under the age of 18 living with them, 50.03% were married couples living together, 9.00% had a female householder with no spouse present, and 37.91% were non-families. 31.20% of all households were made up of individuals, and 21.10% had someone living alone who was 65 years of age or older. The average household size was 2.27 and the average family size was 2.83.

The township's age distribution consisted of 19.2% under the age of 18, 7.1% from 18 to 24, 26.7% from 25 to 44, 25.1% from 45 to 64, and 21.8% who were 65 years of age or older. The median age was 43.8 years. For every 100 females, there were 87.5 males. For every 100 females age 18 and over, there were 88.7 males.

The median income for a household in the township was $54,980, and the median income for a family was $63,466. Males had a median income of $42,342 versus $24,525 for females. The per capita income for the township was $26,967. About 11.5% of families and 13.7% of the population were below the poverty line, including 16.9% of those under age 18 and 13.4% of those age 65 or over.

Historical population
| Census | Pop. | Note | %± |
|---|---|---|---|
| 2000 | 3,936 | | — |
| 2010 | 3,830 | | −2.7% |
| 2020 | 3,650 | | −4.7% |
U.S. Decennial Census

== School districts ==
- Hamilton County Community Unit School District 10

== Political districts ==
- Illinois's 19th congressional district
- State House District 117
- State House District 118
- State Senate District 59
