= Illinois Route 142 =

State highway in southeastern Illinois, US

Illinois Route 142
- IL 142 highlighted in red

Route information
- Maintained by IDOT
- Length: 55.06 mi (88.61 km)
- Existed: 1926–present

Major junctions
- South end: Calhoun Street in Equality
- US 45 in Eldorado
- North end: IL 37 / IL 148 in Mt. Vernon

Location
- Country: United States
- State: Illinois
- Counties: Jefferson, Hamilton, Saline, Gallatin

Highway system
- Illinois State Highway System; Interstate; US; State; Tollways; Scenic
← IL 141	→ IL 143

Illinois Route 142 is a major arterial road in southeastern Illinois. It runs from near the town center of Equality at Calhoun Street, a local road, north to Illinois Route 37 and the northern terminus of Illinois Route 148 in Mount Vernon. This is a distance of 55.06 miles (88.61 km).

== Route description ==
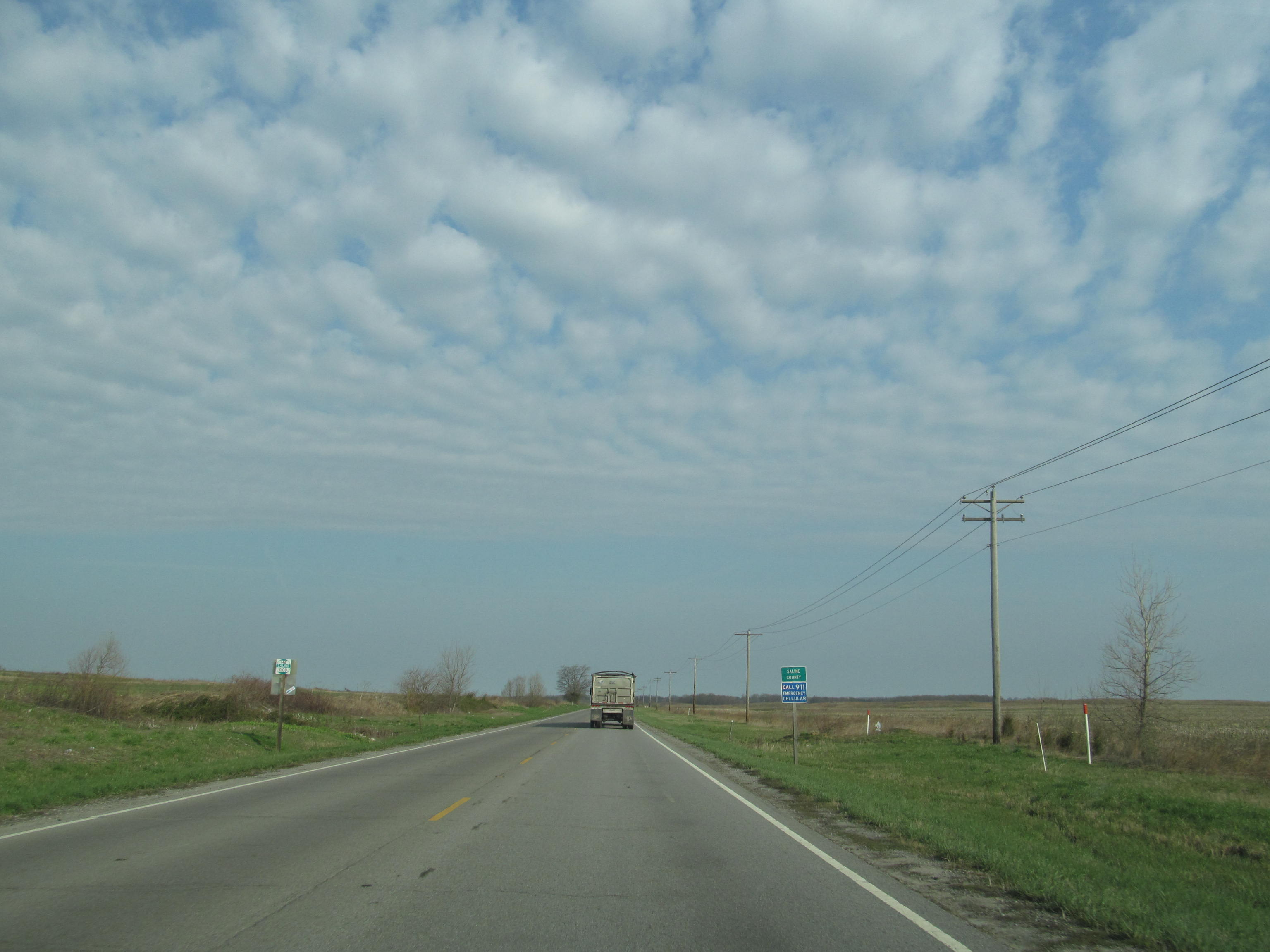
Illinois Route 142

Illinois 142 runs northwest from Equality. Before reaching Eldorado, it intersects Illinois Route 13 and U.S. Route 45. Illinois 142 largely parallels the North Fork of the Saline River before reaching McLeansboro and intersecting Illinois Route 14 and Illinois Route 242, a spur of Illinois 142. Route 142 then proceeds northwesterly following the alignment of the former US Route 460, passing through Dahlgren and crossing Interstate 64 without an interchange, before entering the Mount Vernon area. In Mt. Vernon, Illinois 142 passes the sole remaining Continental Tire North America manufacturing plant, becoming Fisher Lane for a short distance before intersecting IL 37. Illinois 142 crosses IL 37, where its name changes to Veterans Memorial Drive. It proceeds along Veterans Memorial Drive ending at the northern terminus of Illinois Route 148 (Waltonville Road).

Illinois 142 passes through these communities with a population greater than 500: Mount Vernon, Illinois, Dahlgren, McLeansboro, Eldorado, and Equality.

== History ==
SBI Route 142 ran from Effingham to McLeansboro along what is Illinois 37 today. It was changed in the mid-1930s to its current routing. In 1947, U.S. Route 460 was applied onto Illinois 142 from Mount Vernon to McLeansboro; Illinois 142 was then moved onto what was then Illinois Route 147, which had been Illinois Route 142A, or the highway north from McLeansboro to Wayne City.

This configuration lasted until 1974, when U.S. 460 was decommissioned and the current routing for Illinois 142 re-established from Mount Vernon to McLeansboro. The road from McLeansboro north to Wayne City was again renamed, to Illinois 242.

Illinois Route 142 runs roughly parallels to and near the path of the historic Goshen Road in the counties it traverses.

== Major Intersections ==
County	Location	mi	km	Destinations	Notes
Gallatin	Equality	0.0	0.0	Calhoun Street	Southern terminus of IL 142
Gallatin		1.4	2.3	IL 13 – Harrisburg, Shawneetown	
Saline	Eldorado	7.6	12.2	US 45 – Harrisburg, Norris City	
Hamilton	McLeansboro	28.5	45.9	IL 14 (Randolph Street) / Lincoln Heritage Trail (Southern Branch) – Benton, Carmi	Southbound IL 142 has a two-block overlap with IL 14; southern terminus of Lincoln Heritage Trail Western Branch
Hamilton	McLeansboro	28.9	46.5	IL 242 north (Washington Street) – Wayne City	Southern terminus of IL 242
Jefferson	Mt. Vernon	55.06	88.61	IL 37 (10th Street) / Lincoln Heritage Trail (Western Branch)	Northern terminus of IL 142; northern end of Lincoln Heritage Trail overlap
Jefferson	Mt. Vernon			IL 148 south (Veterans Memorial Drive)	Continuation beyond IL 37
1.000 mi = 1.609 km; 1.000 km = 0.621 mi: Concurrency terminus
