= Knights Prairie Township, Hamilton County, Illinois =

Knights Prairie Township
- Township
- Location in Hamilton County

- Hamilton County's location in Illinois
- Coordinates: 38°04′38″N 88°39′30″W
- Country: United States
- State: Illinois
- County: Hamilton
- Established: November 3, 1885

Area
  - Total: 36.39 sq mi (94.2 km^{2})
  - Land: 36.30 sq mi (94.0 km^{2})
  - Water: 0.09 sq mi (0.23 km^{2}) 0.25%
- Elevation: 505 ft (154 m)

Population (2020)
  - Total: 545
  - Density: 15.0/sq mi (5.80/km^{2})
- Time zone: UTC-6 (CST)
  - Summer (DST): UTC-5 (CDT)
- ZIP codes: 62828, 62835, 62859, 62887
- FIPS code: 17-065-40299

Knights Prairie Township is one of twelve townships in Hamilton County, Illinois, USA. As of the 2020 census, its population was 545 and it contained 250 housing units.

== Geography ==
According to the 2021 census gazetteer files, Knight Prairie Township has a total area of 36.39 square miles (94.25 km^{2}), of which 36.30 square miles (94.02 km^{2}) (or 99.75%) is land and 0.09 square miles (0.23 km^{2}) (or 0.25%) is water.

== Demographics ==
As of the 2020 census there were 545 people, 181 households, and 115 families residing in the township. The population density was 14.98 inhabitants per square mile (5.78/km^{2}). There were 250 housing units at an average density of 6.87 per square mile (2.65/km^{2}). The racial makeup of the township was 93.03% White, 0.55% African American, 0.18% Native American, 0.00% Asian, 0.00% Pacific Islander, 0.73% from other races, and 5.50% from two or more races. Hispanic or Latino of any race were 1.83% of the population.

There were 181 households, out of which 2.80% had children under the age of 18 living with them, 53.04% were married couples living together, 10.50% had a female householder with no spouse present, and 36.46% were non-families. 29.80% of all households were made up of individuals, and 13.30% had someone living alone who was 65 years of age or older. The average household size was 1.83 and the average family size was 2.19.

The township's age distribution consisted of 3.9% under the age of 18, 3.9% from 18 to 24, 15.1% from 25 to 44, 21.1% from 45 to 64, and 55.9% who were 65 years of age or older. The median age was 68.0 years. For every 100 females, there were 106.9 males. For every 100 females age 18 and over, there were 105.2 males.

The median income for a household in the township was $54,659, and the median income for a family was $85,750. Males had a median income of $17,222 versus $19,565 for females. The per capita income for the township was $43,057. None of the population was below the poverty line.

Historical population
| Census | Pop. | Note | %± |
|---|---|---|---|
| 2000 | 526 | | — |
| 2010 | 574 | | 9.1% |
| 2020 | 545 | | −5.1% |
U.S. Decennial Census

== School districts ==
- Hamilton County Community Unit School District 10

== Political districts ==
- Illinois's 19th congressional district
- State House District 108
- State Senate District 54
