= Aden, Illinois =

- Unincorporated community
- Location within Illinois Location within the United States
- Coordinates: 38°14′30″N 88°27′30″W
- Country: United States
- State: Illinois
- County: Hamilton
- Elevation: 400 ft (120 m)
- Time zone: UTC-6 (Central (CST))
  - Summer (DST): UTC-5 (CDT)
- Area code: 618
- GNIS feature ID: 422386

Aden is an unincorporated community in Hamilton County, Illinois, United States. Aden is 6 miles (9.7 km) west of Mill Shoals.

== History ==
Aden was originally called Lower Hills. A post office was established at Lower Hills in 1875, and the post office was renamed Aden in 1894.
