= West Rural Hill, Illinois =

- Unincorporated community
- Location within Illinois Location within the United States
- Coordinates: 37°57′56″N 88°41′18″W
- Country: United States
- State: Illinois
- County: Hamilton
- Elevation: 587 ft (179 m)
- Time zone: UTC-6 (Central (CST))
  - Summer (DST): UTC-5 (CDT)
- Area code: 618
- GNIS feature ID: 423302

West Rural Hill is an unincorporated community in Hamilton County, Illinois, United States. West Rural Hill is 5 miles (8.0 km) northeast of Thompsonville.
