= Dale, Illinois =

- Unincorporated community
- Location within Illinois Location within the United States
- Coordinates: 37°59′42″N 88°29′30″W
- Country: United States
- State: Illinois
- County: Hamilton
- Elevation: 400 ft (120 m)
- Time zone: UTC-6 (Central (CST))
  - Summer (DST): UTC-5 (CDT)
- ZIP code: 62829
- Area code: 618
- GNIS feature ID: 406928

Dale is an unincorporated community which is located in Hamilton County, Illinois, United States. The elevation of Dale is 400 feet.

The community is in the Wabash Valley seismic zone.

== History ==
Dale was laid out in about 1871 when the railroad was extended to that point. The community was named for Reuben Dale, the owner of a local mill. A post office called Dale has been in operation since 1882.
