= Wayne City, Illinois =

Wayne City
- Village
- Nickname: Bean Capital of Little Egypt
- Location of Wayne City in Wayne County, Illinois.
- Coordinates: 38°20′53″N 88°35′20″W
- Country: United States
- State: Illinois
- County: Wayne

Government
  - Mayor: Jacob "Pug" Thomason

Area
  - Total: 1.74 sq mi (4.51 km^{2})
  - Land: 1.73 sq mi (4.48 km^{2})
  - Water: 0.012 sq mi (0.03 km^{2})
- Elevation: 449 ft (137 m)

Population (2020)
  - Total: 994
  - Density: 574.8/sq mi (221.95/km^{2})
- Time zone: UTC-6 (CST)
  - Summer (DST): UTC-5 (CDT)
- ZIP code: 62895
- Area code: 618
- FIPS code: 17-79436
- GNIS feature ID: 2400113
- Website: www.villageofwaynecity.com

Wayne City is a village in Wayne County, Illinois, United States. The population was 994 at the 2020 census.

== Geography ==
According to the 2010 census, Wayne City has a total area of 1.72 square miles (4.45 km^{2}), all land.

== Demographics ==
Historical population
Census	Pop.	Note	%±
1900	522		—
1910	620		18.8%
1920	561		−9.5%
1930	577		2.9%
1940	581		0.7%
1950	726		25.0%
1960	903		24.4%
1970	985		9.1%
1980	1,132		14.9%
1990	1,099		−2.9%
2000	1,089		−0.9%
2010	1,032		−5.2%
2020	994		−3.7%
U.S. Decennial Census

As of the census of 2020, there were 994 people residing in the village. According to the 2000 census the population density was 649.3 inhabitants per square mile (250.7/km^{2}). There were 551 housing units at an average density of 328.5 per square mile (126.8/km^{2}). The racial makeup of the village was 99.36% White, 0.09% Native American, 0.09% from other races, and 0.46% from two or more races. Hispanic or Latino of any race were 0.55% of the population.

There were 479 households, out of which 30.7% had children under the age of 18 living with them, 52.4% were married couples living together, 9.8% had a female householder with no husband present, and 34.4% were non-families. 33.4% of all households were made up of individuals, and 20.3% had someone living alone who was 65 years of age or older. The average household size was 2.27 and the average family size was 2.86.

In the village, the population was spread out, with 25.3% under the age of 18, 8.0% from 18 to 24, 24.2% from 25 to 44, 20.5% from 45 to 64, and 21.9% who were 65 years of age or older. The median age was 37 years. For every 100 females, there were 87.1 males. For every 100 females age 18 and over, there were 79.1 males.

The median income for a household in the village was $27,009, and the median income for a family was $33,750. Males had a median income of $28,269 versus $21,842 for females. The per capita income for the village was $13,333. About 13.6% of families and 18.4% of the population were below the poverty line, including 22.0% of those under age 18 and 17.7% of those age 65 or over.

== Culture ==
The town hosts an annual festival called Bean Days which typically involves a parade, a pageant, and a rodeo, as well as a free ham and bean dinner with corn bread. The local 4-H club, Wayne City 4-H Club, is also responsible for setting up and serving the communal dinner.

The Wayne City School District's original school facility was originally built in the 1930s, but was torn down after the 2015–2016 school year to make room for a new facility. The new school's construction began in 2015 and ended in the middle of 2016 before the start of the school year.
