= Hamilton County, Illinois =

County in Illinois, United States

- County
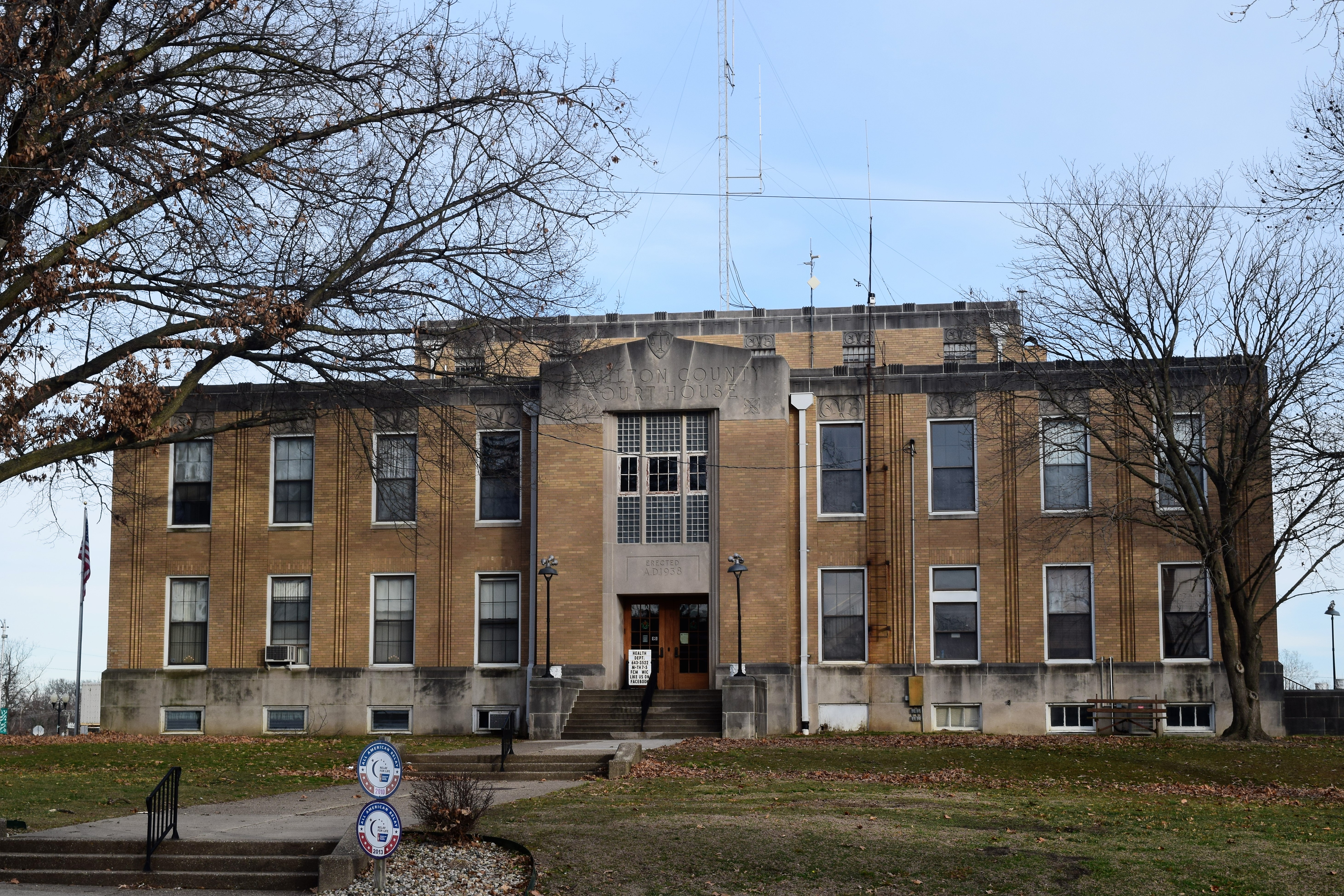
- Hamilton County Courthouse in McLeansboro

- Flag Seal

- Location within the U.S. state of Illinois
- Coordinates: 38°05′N 88°32′W
- Country: United States
- State: Illinois
- Founded: 1821
- Named for: Alexander Hamilton
- Seat: McLeansboro
- Largest city: McLeansboro

Area
  - Total: 436 sq mi (1,130 km^{2})
  - Land: 435 sq mi (1,130 km^{2})
  - Water: 1.2 sq mi (3.1 km^{2})

Population (2020)
  - Total: 7,993
  - Estimate (2025): 7,859 ▼
  - Density: 18.4/sq mi (7.09/km^{2})
- Time zone: UTC−6 (Central)
  - Summer (DST): UTC−5 (CDT)
- Congressional district: 12th
- Website: www.hamiltoncountyil.gov

Hamilton County is a county located in the U.S. state of Illinois. As of the 2020 census, its population was 7,993. Its county seat is McLeansboro. It is located in the southern portion of the state, known locally as "Little Egypt".

== History ==
Hamilton County was formed out of White County in 1821. It is named for Alexander Hamilton, Revolutionary War hero and the first United States Secretary of the Treasury.

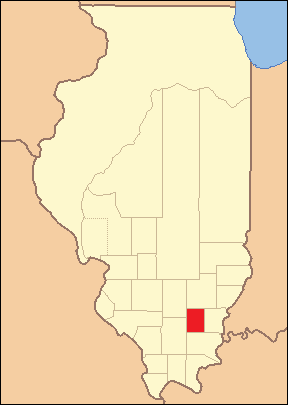
Hamilton County at the time of its creation in 1821

On March 18, 1925, the infamous Tri-State Tornado tore across the county, destroying dozens of homes and farms in Flannigan, Twigg, Mayberry, and Crook townships, and killing 41 people.

== Geography ==
According to the U.S. Census Bureau, the county has a total area of 436 square miles (1,130 km^{2}), of which 435 square miles (1,130 km^{2}) is land and 1.2 square miles (3.1 km^{2}) (0.3%) is water.

=== Climate and weather ===
McLeansboro, Illinois

Climate chart (precipitation, max. and min. temperature)
J	F	M	A	M	J	J	A	S	O	N	D
3.2 39 20	2.8 45 24	4.5 55 34	4.6 66 43	4.7 76 53	3.9 85 62	3.5 89 66	3 88 63	2.9 81 55	3 70 43	4.5 56 35	3.6 44 25
- █ Average max. and min. temperatures in °F
- █ Precipitation totals in inches
- Source: The Weather Channel
Metric conversion
J	F	M	A	M	J	J	A	S	O	N	D
80 4 −7	70 7 −4	113 13 1	117 19 6	119 24 12	98 29 17	88 32 19	75 31 17	73 27 13	75 21 6	115 13 2	91 7 −4
- █ Average max. and min. temperatures in °C
- █ Precipitation totals in mm

In recent years, average temperatures in the county seat of McLeansboro have ranged from a low of 20 °F (−7 °C) in January to a high of 89 °F (32 °C) in July, although a record low of −23 °F (−31 °C) was recorded in January 1930 and a record high of 113 °F (45 °C) was recorded in July 1936. Average monthly precipitation ranged from 2.76 inches (70 mm) in February to 4.67 inches (119 mm) in May.

=== Transit ===
- Rides Mass Transit District

=== Major highways ===
- Illinois Route 14
- Illinois Route 142
- Illinois Route 242

=== Adjacent counties ===
- Wayne County - north
- White County - east
- Gallatin County - southeast
- Saline County - south
- Franklin County - west
- Jefferson County - northwest

== Demographics ==
Historical population
Census	Pop.	Note	%±
1830	2,616		—
1840	3,945		50.8%
1850	6,362		61.3%
1860	9,915		55.8%
1870	13,014		31.3%
1880	16,712		28.4%
1890	17,800		6.5%
1900	20,197		13.5%
1910	18,227		−9.8%
1920	15,920		−12.7%
1930	12,995		−18.4%
1940	13,454		3.5%
1950	12,256		−8.9%
1960	10,010		−18.3%
1970	8,665		−13.4%
1980	9,172		5.9%
1990	8,499		−7.3%
2000	8,621		1.4%
2010	8,457		−1.9%
2020	7,993		−5.5%
2025 (est.)	7,859	▼	−1.7%
U.S. Decennial Census; 1790-1960 1900-1990; 1990-2000 2010-2013

2000 census age pyramid for Hamilton County

=== 2020 census ===
As of the 2020 census, the county had a population of 7,993. The median age was 43.2 years, 22.7% of residents were under the age of 18, and 21.7% were 65 years of age or older. For every 100 females there were 97.7 males, and for every 100 females age 18 and over there were 96.0 males age 18 and over.

The racial makeup of the county was 95.1% White, 0.5% Black or African American, 0.2% American Indian and Alaska Native, 0.2% Asian, <0.1% Native Hawaiian and Pacific Islander, 0.3% from some other race, and 3.7% from two or more races. Hispanic or Latino residents of any race comprised 1.2% of the population.

<0.1% of residents lived in urban areas, while 100.0% lived in rural areas.

There were 3,328 households in the county, of which 28.7% had children under the age of 18 living in them. Of all households, 49.8% were married-couple households, 19.2% were households with a male householder and no spouse or partner present, and 25.1% were households with a female householder and no spouse or partner present. About 30.0% of all households were made up of individuals and 15.1% had someone living alone who was 65 years of age or older.

There were 3,806 housing units, of which 12.6% were vacant. Among occupied housing units, 78.7% were owner-occupied and 21.3% were renter-occupied. The homeowner vacancy rate was 1.9% and the rental vacancy rate was 9.9%.

=== Racial and ethnic composition ===
Hamilton County, Illinois – Racial and ethnic composition Note: the US Census treats Hispanic/Latino as an ethnic category. This table excludes Latinos from the racial categories and assigns them to a separate category. Hispanics/Latinos may be of any race.
Race / Ethnicity (NH = Non-Hispanic)	Pop 1980	Pop 1990	Pop 2000	Pop 2010	Pop 2020	% 1980	% 1990	% 2000	% 2010	% 2020
White alone (NH)	9,106	8,440	8,434	8,234	7,574	99.28%	99.31%	97.83%	97.36%	94.76%
Black or African American alone (NH)	1	3	57	31	36	0.01%	0.04%	0.66%	0.37%	0.45%
Native American or Alaska Native alone (NH)	12	11	15	10	16	0.13%	0.13%	0.17%	0.12%	0.20%
Asian alone (NH)	10	16	11	19	12	0.11%	0.19%	0.13%	0.22%	0.15%
Native Hawaiian or Pacific Islander alone (NH)	x	x	1	0	0	x	x	0.01%	0.00%	0.00%
Other race alone (NH)	1	0	2	0	1	0.01%	0.00%	0.02%	0.00%	0.01%
Mixed race or Multiracial (NH)	x	x	46	58	258	x	x	0.53%	0.69%	3.23%
Hispanic or Latino (any race)	42	29	55	105	96	0.46%	0.34%	0.64%	1.24%	1.20%
Total	9,172	8,499	8,621	8,457	7,993	100.00%	100.00%	100.00%	100.00%	100.00%

=== 2010 census ===
As of the 2010 United States census, there were 8,457 people, 3,489 households, and 2,376 families residing in the county. The population density was 19.5 inhabitants per square mile (7.5/km^{2}). There were 4,104 housing units at an average density of 9.4 per square mile (3.6/km^{2}). The racial makeup of the county was 98.2% white, 0.4% black or African American, 0.2% Asian, 0.2% American Indian, 0.3% from other races, and 0.7% from two or more races. Those of Hispanic or Latino origin made up 1.2% of the population. In terms of ancestry, 33.1% were German, 20.7% were Irish, 11.4% were English, and 10.3% were American.

Of the 3,489 households, 29.8% had children under the age of 18 living with them, 54.9% were married couples living together, 9.2% had a female householder with no husband present, 31.9% were non-families, and 28.1% of all households were made up of individuals. The average household size was 2.39 and the average family size was 2.91. The median age was 43.1 years.

The median income for a household in the county was $35,032 and the median income for a family was $50,878. Males had a median income of $45,245 versus $23,491 for females. The per capita income for the county was $21,602. About 8.2% of families and 14.5% of the population were below the poverty line, including 21.5% of those under age 18 and 8.5% of those age 65 or over.

== Communities ==
=== City ===
- McLeansboro

=== Incorporated town ===
- Belle Prairie City

=== Villages ===
- Broughton
- Dahlgren
- Macedonia (partly in Franklin County)

=== Unincorporated communities ===
- Aden
- Blairsville (Flannigan's Store)
- Braden
- Cornerville
- Dale
- Delafield
- Piopolis
- Rural Hill
- Tuckers Corners
- West Rural Hill

=== Townships ===
Hamilton County is divided into twelve townships:

- Beaver Creek
- Crook
- Crouch
- Dahlgren
- Flannigan
- Knight Prairie
- Mayberry
- McLeansboro
- South Crouch
- South Flannigan
- South Twigg
- Twigg

== Politics ==
Like most of Southern-leaning Southern Illinois, Hamilton County was heavily Democratic before the Civil War, and unlike such counties as Johnson, Pope and Massac, it did not turn Republican after the war. Not until 1920, when isolationist sentiments turned many voters against the party of Woodrow Wilson, did Hamilton County vote Republican, and Herbert Hoover was to carry the county in 1928 due to anti-Catholic sentiment against Al Smith.

From 1940 onwards, when Wendell Willkie carried the county due to opposition to involvement in World War II, Hamilton has become increasingly Republican. Although Lyndon Johnson, Jimmy Carter in 1976 and Bill Clinton in 1992 all gained absolute majorities for the Democratic Party (with Michael Dukakis losing the county by just four votes in 1988), a rapid swing to the Republicans has taken place since 1992. This trend matches all traditionally Democratic parts of the Upland South.

United States presidential election results for Hamilton County, Illinois
Year	Republican		Democratic		Third party(ies)	
Year	No.	%	No.	%	No.	%
1892	1,505	39.80%	2,061	54.51%	215	5.69%
1896	1,767	41.92%	2,408	57.13%	40	0.95%
1900	1,911	42.95%	2,467	55.45%	71	1.60%
1904	1,894	45.65%	2,049	49.39%	206	4.97%
1908	1,809	44.26%	2,128	52.07%	150	3.67%
1912	1,242	31.33%	1,920	48.44%	802	20.23%
1916	3,239	46.26%	3,644	52.05%	118	1.69%
1920	3,220	54.71%	2,591	44.02%	75	1.27%
1924	2,659	44.02%	3,168	52.44%	214	3.54%
1928	3,275	51.08%	3,037	47.36%	100	1.56%
1932	2,513	37.98%	4,059	61.34%	45	0.68%
1936	3,321	44.07%	4,152	55.10%	62	0.82%
1940	4,005	51.69%	3,691	47.64%	52	0.67%
1944	3,582	54.68%	2,914	44.48%	55	0.84%
1948	2,887	50.93%	2,750	48.51%	32	0.56%
1952	4,047	60.25%	2,662	39.63%	8	0.12%
1956	3,675	57.75%	2,685	42.19%	4	0.06%
1960	3,804	58.94%	2,639	40.89%	11	0.17%
1964	2,561	44.98%	3,133	55.02%	0	0.00%
1968	2,912	52.82%	1,951	35.39%	650	11.79%
1972	3,282	61.94%	2,006	37.86%	11	0.21%
1976	2,433	44.25%	3,036	55.22%	29	0.53%
1980	3,254	59.64%	1,990	36.47%	212	3.89%
1984	3,074	57.50%	2,251	42.11%	21	0.39%
1988	2,622	49.89%	2,618	49.81%	16	0.30%
1992	1,521	30.58%	2,582	51.91%	871	17.51%
1996	1,677	37.19%	2,242	49.72%	590	13.08%
2000	2,519	54.92%	1,943	42.36%	125	2.73%
2004	2,653	58.77%	1,814	40.19%	47	1.04%
2008	2,353	54.93%	1,796	41.92%	135	3.15%
2012	2,566	65.11%	1,269	32.20%	106	2.69%
2016	3,206	77.14%	802	19.30%	148	3.56%
2020	3,432	79.39%	824	19.06%	67	1.55%
2024	3,385	80.71%	739	17.62%	70	1.67%

== See also ==
- National Register of Historic Places listings in Hamilton County, Illinois
