= Belle Prairie City, Illinois =

- Town
- Location of Belle Prairie City in Hamilton County, Illinois.
- Coordinates: 38°13′25″N 88°33′21″W
- Country: United States
- State: Illinois
- County: Hamilton
- Township: Crouch
- Incorporated: March 30, 1869

Area
  - Total: 0.44 sq mi (1.13 km^{2})
  - Land: 0.44 sq mi (1.13 km^{2})
  - Water: 0 sq mi (0.00 km^{2})
- Elevation: 476 ft (145 m)

Population (2020)
  - Total: 49
  - Density: 111.9/sq mi (43.19/km^{2})
- Time zone: UTC-6 (CST)
  - Summer (DST): UTC-5 (CDT)
- ZIP code: 62828
- Area code: 618
- FIPS code: 17-04793
- GNIS ID: 2396587

Belle Prairie City is an incorporated town in Hamilton County, Illinois, United States. The population was 49 at the 2020 census. It is part of the Mount Vernon Micropolitan Statistical Area.

== Geography ==
Belle Prairie City is located in northern Hamilton County 24 miles (39 km) southeast of the city of Mount Vernon and 4 miles (6 km) south of Interstate 64 via Exit 100. It is 10 miles (16 km) north of McLeansboro, the Hamilton County seat.

According to the 2021 census gazetteer files, Belle Prairie City has a total area of 0.44 square miles (1.14 km^{2}), all land.

== Demographics ==
Historical population
Census	Pop.	Note	%±
1900	129		—
1910	87		−32.6%
1920	78		−10.3%
1930	48		−38.5%
1940	67		39.6%
1950	82		22.4%
1960	82		0.0%
1970	52		−36.6%
1980	58		11.5%
1990	64		10.3%
2000	60		−6.2%
2010	54		−10.0%
2020	49		−9.3%
U.S. Decennial Census

As of the 2020 census there were 49 people, 33 households, and 31 families residing in the town. The population density was 111.87 inhabitants per square mile (43.19/km^{2}). There were 23 housing units at an average density of 52.51 per square mile (20.27/km^{2}). The racial makeup of the town was 97.96% White, 0.00% African American, 0.00% Native American, 0.00% Asian, 0.00% Pacific Islander, 0.00% from other races, and 2.04% from two or more races. Hispanic or Latino of any race were 0.00% of the population.

There were 33 households, out of which 57.6% had children under the age of 18 living with them, 39.39% were married couples living together, 54.55% had a female householder with no husband present, and 6.06% were non-families. 6.06% of all households were made up of individuals, and 6.06% had someone living alone who was 65 years of age or older. The average household size was 2.16 and the average family size was 2.27.

The town's age distribution consisted of 28.0% under the age of 18, 8.0% from 18 to 24, 26.6% from 25 to 44, 17.4% from 45 to 64, and 20.0% who were 65 years of age or older. The median age was 40.5 years. For every 100 females, there were 63.0 males. For every 100 females age 18 and over, there were 68.8 males.

The median income for a family was $34,107. Males had a median income of $44,167 versus $33,036 for females. The per capita income for the town was $21,993. About 25.8% of families and 21.3% of the population were below the poverty line, including 23.8% of those under age 18 and 33.3% of those age 65 or over.
