= McLeansboro, Illinois =

- City
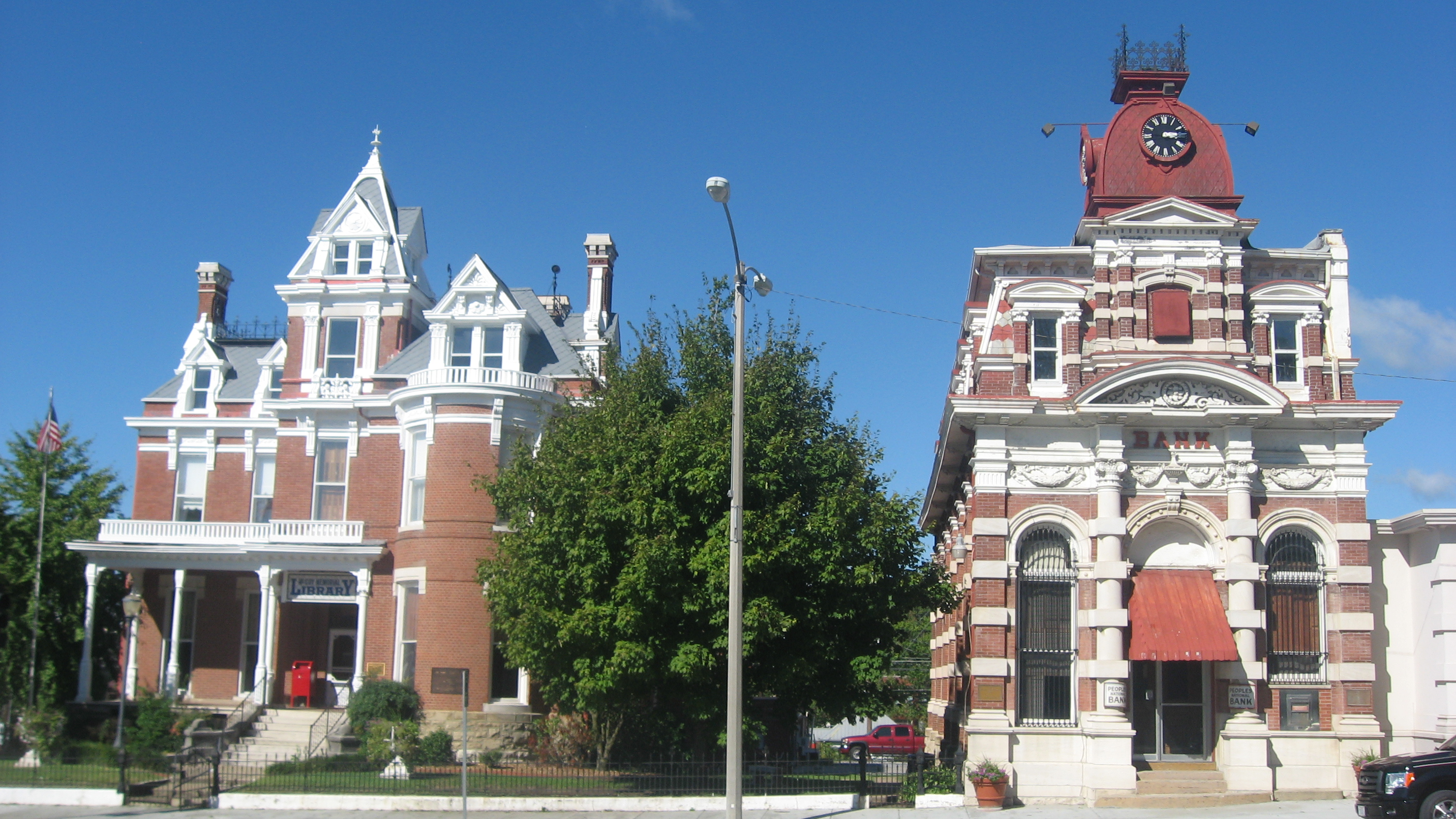
- Street view of the Aaron G. Cloud House and the Cloud State Bank, located at 164 and 108 S. Washington Street in McLeansboro
- Etymology: William McLean
- Interactive map of McLeansboro, Illinois
- Location within Illinois Location within the United States
- Coordinates: 38°05′24″N 88°32′19″W
- Country: United States
- State: Illinois
- County: Hamilton
- Township: McLeansboro

Area
  - Total: 2.88 sq mi (7.45 km^{2})
  - Land: 2.75 sq mi (7.11 km^{2})
  - Water: 0.13 sq mi (0.34 km^{2})
- Elevation: 449 ft (137 m)

Population (2020)
  - Total: 2,675
  - Density: 974.8/sq mi (376.37/km^{2})
- Time zone: UTC-6 (CST)
  - Summer (DST): UTC-5 (CDT)
- ZIP Code(s): 62859
- Area code: 618
- FIPS code: 17-45824
- GNIS feature ID: 2395074
- Website: mcleansboro.us

McLeansboro (/məkˈleɪnzbəroʊ/) is a city and the county seat of Hamilton County, Illinois, Illinois, United States. The population was 2,675 at the 2020 census.

McLeansboro is part of the Mount Vernon, Illinois micropolitan area.

== History ==
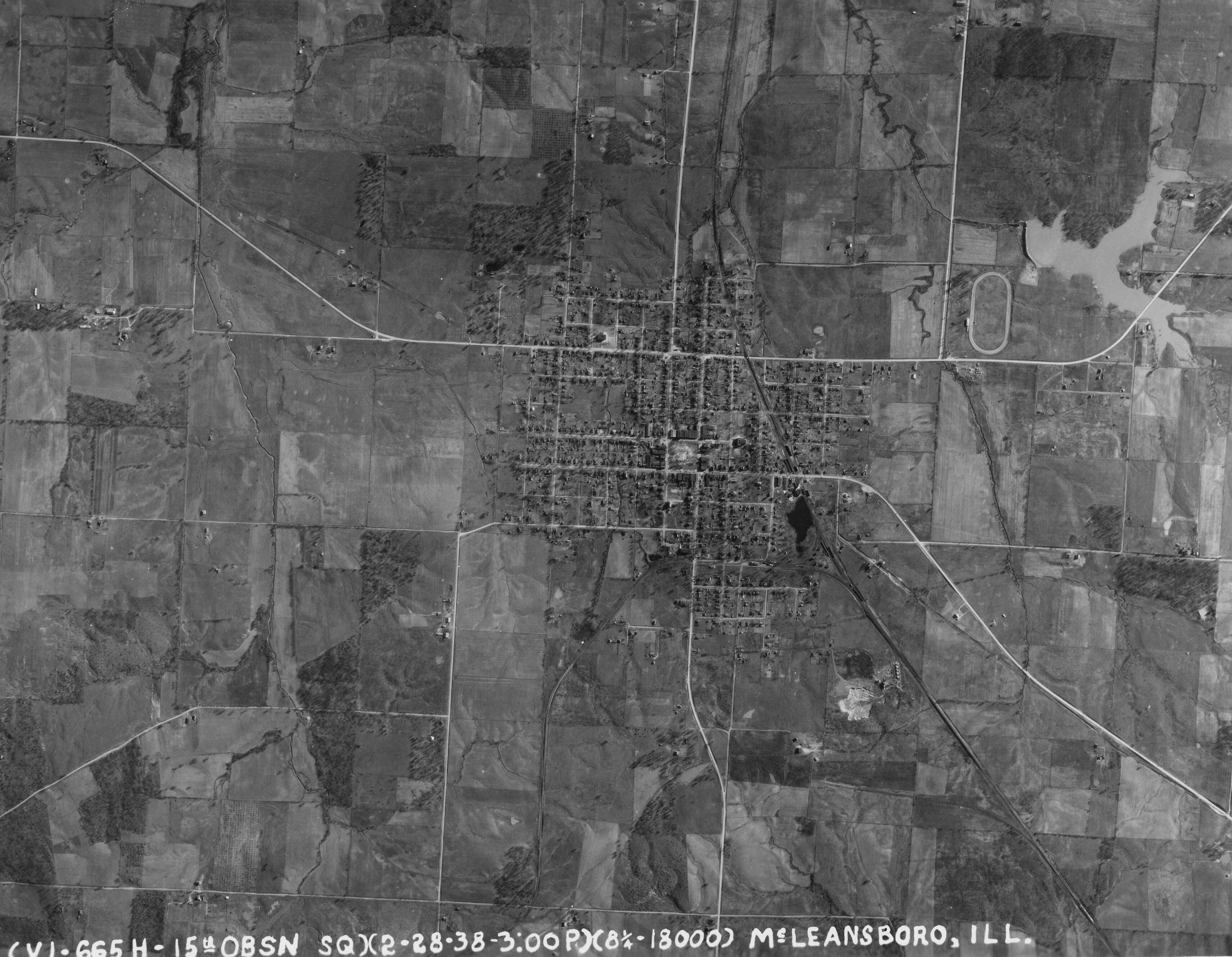
McLeansboro in 1938

The city was named for Dr. William McLean, an early settler who had resided there in 1821. On September 26, 1911 one of the first air mail deliveries was made to McLeansboro by pilot Horace Kearney. In 1940 a post office lobby mural was commissioned honoring the event, depicting a plane flying over a grassy field surrounded by circus tents and residents of McLeansboro.

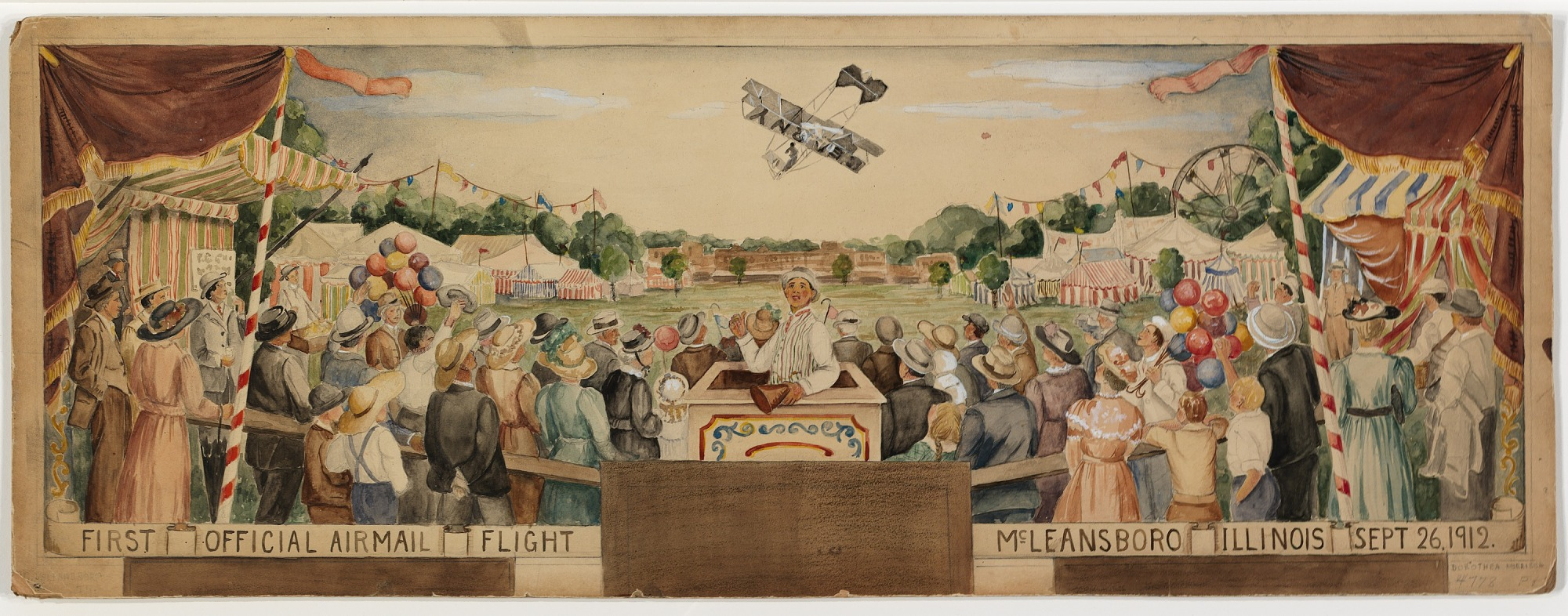
Mural study for McLeansboro, Illinois Post Office by Dorothea Mierisch.

== Geography ==
According to the 2021 census gazetteer files, McLeansboro has a total area of 2.87 square miles (7.43 km^{2}), of which 2.74 square miles (7.10 km^{2}) (or 95.48%) is land and 0.13 square miles (0.34 km^{2}) (or 4.52%) is water.

=== Climate ===
Climate data for McLeansboro, Illinois (1991–2020)
Month	Jan	Feb	Mar	Apr	May	Jun	Jul	Aug	Sep	Oct	Nov	Dec	Year
Mean daily maximum °F (°C)	41.1 (5.1)	46.2 (7.9)	56.4 (13.6)	67.5 (19.7)	77.0 (25.0)	85.4 (29.7)	89.2 (31.8)	88.1 (31.2)	82.1 (27.8)	70.4 (21.3)	56.3 (13.5)	45.3 (7.4)	67.1 (19.5)
Daily mean °F (°C)	31.6 (−0.2)	35.2 (1.8)	45.0 (7.2)	55.5 (13.1)	65.8 (18.8)	74.0 (23.3)	77.5 (25.3)	75.5 (24.2)	68.6 (20.3)	56.8 (13.8)	44.5 (6.9)	35.4 (1.9)	55.5 (13.0)
Mean daily minimum °F (°C)	22.1 (−5.5)	24.3 (−4.3)	33.6 (0.9)	43.6 (6.4)	54.6 (12.6)	62.6 (17.0)	65.9 (18.8)	63.0 (17.2)	55.2 (12.9)	43.2 (6.2)	32.6 (0.3)	25.5 (−3.6)	43.9 (6.6)
Average precipitation inches (mm)	3.55 (90)	2.90 (74)	4.53 (115)	5.29 (134)	4.94 (125)	5.05 (128)	3.47 (88)	2.57 (65)	3.50 (89)	3.38 (86)	4.41 (112)	3.50 (89)	47.09 (1,195)
Average snowfall inches (cm)	3.7 (9.4)	3.3 (8.4)	2.1 (5.3)	0.0 (0.0)	0.0 (0.0)	0.0 (0.0)	0.0 (0.0)	0.0 (0.0)	0.0 (0.0)	0.6 (1.5)	0.2 (0.51)	3.4 (8.6)	13.3 (33.71)
Source: NOAA

== Demographics ==
Historical population
Census	Pop.	Note	%±
1850	221		—
1860	446		101.8%
1870	683		53.1%
1880	1,341		96.3%
1890	1,355		1.0%
1900	1,758		29.7%
1910	1,796		2.2%
1920	1,927		7.3%
1930	2,162		12.2%
1940	2,528		16.9%
1950	3,008		19.0%
1960	2,951		−1.9%
1970	2,630		−10.9%
1980	2,960		12.5%
1990	2,677		−9.6%
2000	2,945		10.0%
2010	2,883		−2.1%
2020	2,675		−7.2%
U.S. Decennial Census

=== 2020 census ===
As of the 2020 census, McLeansboro had a population of 2,675. There were 1,198 households and 661 families residing in the city. The population density was 930.76 inhabitants per square mile (359.37/km^{2}). There were 1,365 housing units at an average density of 474.95 per square mile (183.38/km^{2}).

The median age was 42.1 years. 22.2% of residents were under the age of 18 and 23.4% were 65 years of age or older. For every 100 females there were 88.8 males, and for every 100 females age 18 and over there were 82.3 males age 18 and over.

0.0% of residents lived in urban areas, while 100.0% lived in rural areas.

Of all households, 26.8% had children under the age of 18 living in them, 34.2% were married-couple households, 21.3% were households with a male householder and no spouse or partner present, and 37.6% were households with a female householder and no spouse or partner present. About 40.3% of all households were made up of individuals and 21.8% had someone living alone who was 65 years of age or older.

Of the housing units, 12.2% were vacant. The homeowner vacancy rate was 3.7% and the rental vacancy rate was 8.1%.

Racial composition as of the 2020 census
Race	Number	Percent
White	2,515	94.0%
Black or African American	26	1.0%
American Indian and Alaska Native	10	0.4%
Asian	7	0.3%
Native Hawaiian and Other Pacific Islander	0	0.0%
Some other race	16	0.6%
Two or more races	101	3.8%
Hispanic or Latino (of any race)	53	2.0%

=== Income and poverty ===
The median income for a household in the city was $55,714, and the median income for a family was $61,652. Males had a median income of $52,548 versus $20,625 for females. The per capita income for the city was $27,621. About 11.0% of families and 15.9% of the population were below the poverty line, including 24.0% of those under age 18 and 11.1% of those age 65 or over.

== Notable people ==
- Elwood Barker, businessman, farmer, and Illinois state legislator
- Ray Blades, baseball player.
- Paul W. Broyles, businessman and Illinois state legislator
- Jim Burns, former U. S. Attorney
- M. J. Engh, science-fiction author and Roman scholar
- Carl Mauck, former center for the Houston Oilers
- Rodney K. Miller, television host for Small Town Big Deal
- Jerry Sloan, Basketball Hall of Famer, player and head coach for the Chicago Bulls
- H. Allen Smith, author
- John H. Stelle, 29th Governor of Illinois 1940–41, National Commander of the American Legion 1945-46
- Henry C. Warmoth, 23rd Governor of Louisiana

== See also ==
- Hamilton County Courthouse (Illinois)
- 1968 Illinois earthquake
