= Flanagan (surname) =

Flanagan is a common surname of Irish origin and an Anglicised version of the Irish name Ó Flannagáin which is derived from the word "flann" meaning 'red' or 'ruddy'.

== Origin ==
Flanagan is just one variation on the original surname which, according to the 19th century writer Reverend Patrick Woulfe, is:

"...the name of at least five distinct families in different parts of Ireland:

1. of Fermanagh, a branch of the Oirghialla, who were chiefs of Tuathratha, now anglicised Toorah, an extensive district in the barony of Magheraboy, in the northwest of County Fermanagh, and are still numerous in Ulster and County Mayo;
2. of Roscommon, a branch of the Sil-Murry and of the same stock as the O'Connors, who were hereditary stewards to the kings of Connacht and chiefs of Clann Chathail, a district which embraced several parishes in the neighbourhood of Elphin;
3. of Westmeath who were anciently lords of Comair and sometimes of all Teffia;
4. of Ely O'Carroll in present-day County Offaly, who are of the same stock as the O'Carrolls, and were chiefs of Cinel Arga, a district nearly, if not exactly, co-extensive with the present barony of Ballybrit; and
5. of Waterford, who were formerly chiefs of Uachtartire, now the barony of Upperthird, in the north-west of County Waterford, but were dispossessed by the Powers soon after the Anglo-Norman invasion."

Other variations include Flanagin, Flanigan, Flannigan, Flannaghan, Flannagain, Flaniken, Flenigen and so on. The main reason for this variety is the 'Anglicisation' of many Irish place and fore/surnames as a consequence of the colonisation of Ireland (particularly from the 16th century onward) and the subsequent imposition of the English language. With some exceptions all of these variations may be prefixed with Ó (O') - signifying 'son of' or 'Nic' signifying 'daughter of'.

== Prevalence ==
As many Irish migrated during the 19th and 20th centuries (especially in the period 1845–1851 to escape the 'Great Famine') the surname can be found in all major English-speaking countries of the world today. Flanagan is the 69th most common name surname in Ireland, 591st most common in Australia, 791st most common in England and the 1,102nd most common in the USA.

== People ==
- Alex Flanagan (born 1973), American sportscaster
- Amelia Flanagan (born 2008), English actress
- Anna Flanagan (born 1992), Australian field hockey player
- Anthony Flanagan (born 1972), British actor
- Barry Flanagan (1941–2009), Welsh sculptor
- Bernard Joseph Flanagan (1908–1998), American prelate of the Roman Catholic Church
- Bob Flanagan (1952–1996), American writer and performance artist
- Bud Flanagan (1896–1968), English entertainer
- Caitlin Flanagan (born 1961), American journalist
- Caroline Flanagan, President of Law Society of Scotland
- Charles Flanagan (born 1956), Irish Fine Gael politician
- Crista Flanagan (born 1976), American actress
- David 'Dai' Flanagan (born 1985), Welsh rugby union player
- Dan Flanagan (1899–1960), American judge
- De Witt C. Flanagan (1870–1946), American Democratic Party politician from New Jersey
- Edward J. Flanagan (1886–1948), Irish-born American priest
- Ed Flanagan (disambiguation), multiple people
- Finn Flanagan (born 2005), English footballer
- Fionnula Flanagan (born 1941), Irish actress
- Fred Flanagan (1924–2013), Australian rules footballer
- Gaynor Flanagan (1933–1999), Australian basketball player
- Guy Flanagan, British actor
- Hallie Flanagan (1889–1969), American theatre director and producer
- Harley Flanagan (born 1967), American punk rock musician
- Helen Flanagan (born 1990), English actress
- Ian Flanagan (born 1982), British tennis player
- Jack Flanagan (disambiguation), multiple people
- James Flanagan (disambiguation), multiple people
- John Flanagan (disambiguation), multiple people
- Jon Flanagan (born 1993), English footballer
- Kitty Flanagan (born 1970), Australian comedian
- Kyle Flanagan (disambiguation), multiple people
- Lauren Flanigan (born 1959), American operatic soprano
- Luke 'Ming' Flanagan (born 1972), Irish politician
- Maile Flanagan (born 1965), American actress
- Markus Flanagan (born 1964), American actor
- Martin Flanagan (journalist), Australian sports journalist
- Mary Flanagan, American artist, author, educator, and designer
- Matt Flanagan (American football) (born 1995), American football player
- Michael Flanagan (disambiguation), multiple people
- Micky Flanagan (born 1962), English comedian
- Mike Flanagan (disambiguation), multiple people
- Nick Flanagan (born 1984), Australian golfer
- Oliver J. Flanagan (1920–1987), Irish politician
- Owen Flanagan (born 1949), American philosopher
- Patrick Flanagan (1944–2019), American inventor
- Paddy Flanagan (1941–2000), Irish cyclist
- Pauline Flanagan (1925–2003), Irish-born American stage and television actress
- Peggy Flanagan (born 1979), American politician
- Peter Flanagan (1941–2007), English rugby league footballer
- Peter Flanagan (rugby union) (1886–1952), Irish-Australian rugby union player
- Ralph Flanagan (1914–1995), American big band leader, conductor, pianist, composer, and arranger for orchestras
- Ralph Flanagan (swimmer) (1918–1988), American competition swimmer
- Richard Flanagan, Australian writer, historian and film director
- Roderick Flanagan (1828–1862), Irish journalist, poet and historian
- Sir Ronnie Flanagan (born 1949), former British Chief Constable of the Police Service of Northern Ireland (PSNI) and last Chief Constable of the RUC
- Ruth Flanagan (died 1985), American politician
- Seán Flanagan (1922–1993), Irish politician
- Seán Flanagan, Irish comedian
- Shalane Flanagan (born 1981), American middle-distance runner
- Shane Flanagan (born 1965), Australian rugby league football coach
- Steamer Flanagan (1881–1947), Major League baseball player
- Tanya Flanagan, American politician
- Terence Flanagan (born 1975), Irish politician
- Terry Flanagan (disambiguation)
- Thomas Flanagan (disambiguation), multiple people
- Tom Flanagan (disambiguation), multiple people
- Tommy Flanagan (actor) (born 1965)
- Tommy Flanagan (musician) (1930–2001), American jazz pianist
- Vester Flanagan, American news reporter and perpetrator of the Murders of Alison Parker and Adam Ward
- Walt Flanagan (born 1967), American comic book store manager, reality television personality, podcaster, comic book artist, and songwriter

=== See also ===
- Edith M. Flanigen (1929–2026), American chemist
- Flanagan (disambiguation)
- Flanagan (model), early page 3 girl
- Flannigan (disambiguation)
