= Flannagan =

Flannagan is a name. Notable people with the name include:

- Charlie Flannagan (born 1933), Australian rules footballer
- John Flannagan (disambiguation), multiple people, including:
  - John Flannagan (Medal of Honor) (born 1852), American sailor and Medal of Honor recipient
  - John Flannagan (priest) (1860–1926), Catholic priest and president of St. Ambrose College
  - John Bernard Flannagan (1895–1942) American sculptor
  - John W. Flannagan, Jr. (1885–1955), American politician
- Sarah-Jane and Anna Flannagan (nineteenth century), New Zealand murderers
- Flannagan mac Ceallach (fl. 879), Irish poet

== See also ==
- Flanagan (disambiguation)
- Flannigan (disambiguation)
