= James Flannigan =

James Flannigan may refer to:

- James Flannigan (Medal of Honor)
- James Flannigan (songwriter)

== See also ==
- James Flanagan (disambiguation)
