= Flanigan =

Flanigan is an Irish surname, alternatively spelt Flanagan, Flanigen and Flannigan. Notable people with the surname include:

== People ==
- Allen Flanigan (born 2001), American basketball player
- Daniel M. Flanigan (1883-1946), American politician
- Joe Flanigan, American actor
- Peter Flanigan (1923–2013), American investment banker

== Fictional characters ==
- Thomas Flanigan, character in the 1990 film King of New York

== See also ==
- Flanigan, Nevada, United States, named after businessman Patrick L. Flanigan
