= USS Porter (DD-800) =

Fletcher-class destroyer

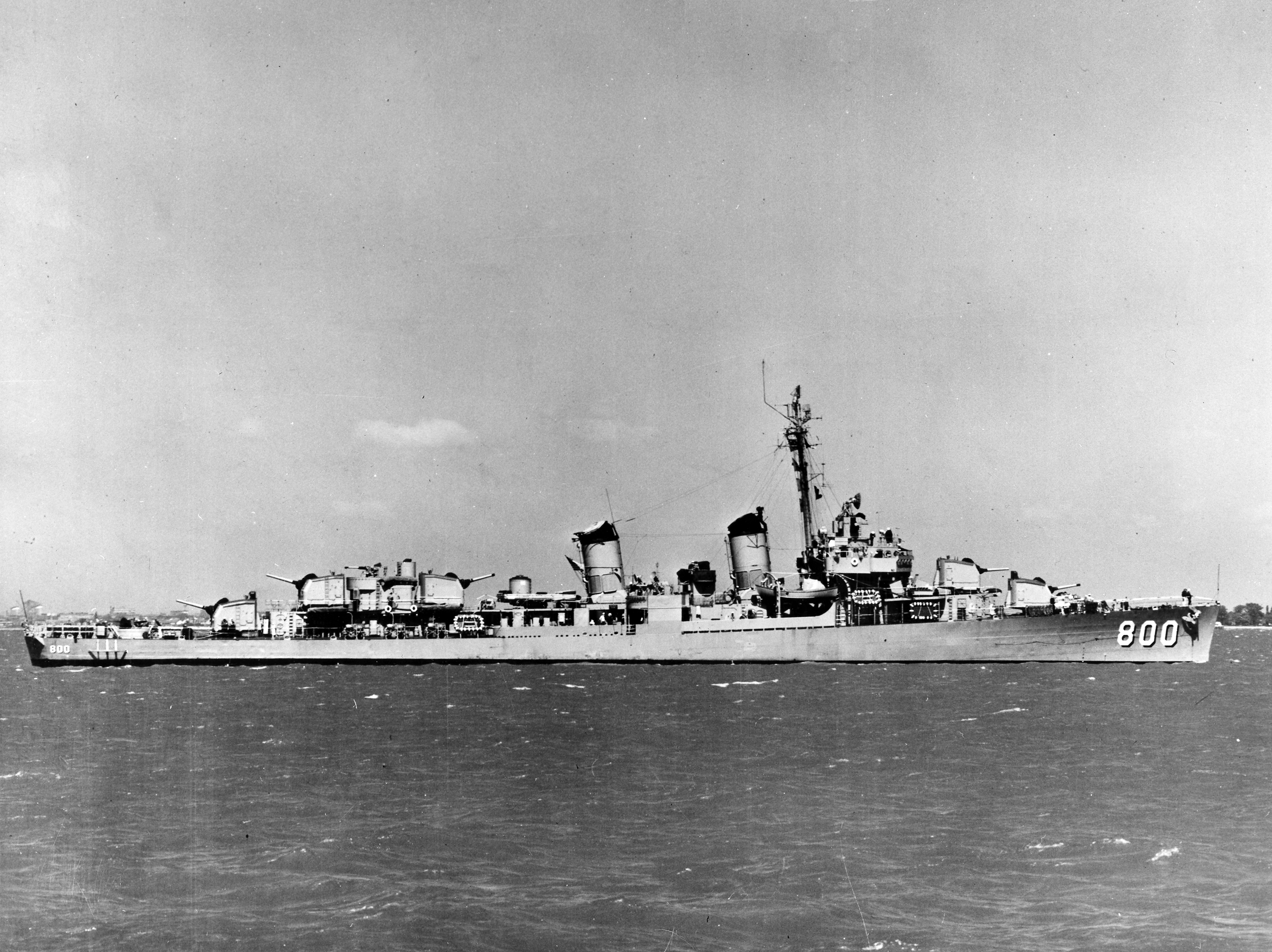

History

United States
- Namesake: David Dixon Porter
- Builder: Todd Pacific Shipyards, Seattle, Washington
- Laid down: 6 July 1943
- Launched: 13 March 1944
- Commissioned: 24 June 1944
- Decommissioned: 10 August 1953
- Stricken: 1 October 1972
- Fate: Sold for scrap, 21 March 1974

General characteristics
- Class & type: Fletcher-class destroyer
- Displacement: 2,050 tons
- Length: 376 ft 5 in (114.73 m)
- Beam: 39 ft 7 in (12.07 m)
- Draft: 13 ft 9 in (4.19 m)
- Propulsion: 60,000 shp (45 MW); geared turbines; 2 propellers
- Speed: 35 knots (65 km/h; 40 mph)
- Range: 6,500 nautical miles at 15 kt; (12,000 km at 30 km/h)
- Complement: 329
- Armament: 5 × 5 in (127 mm) DP guns, 10 × 40 mm AA guns, 7 × 20 mm AA guns, 10 × 21 in (53 cm) torpedo tubes, 6 × depth charge projectors, 2 × depth charge tracks

USS Porter (DD-800) was a Fletcher-class destroyer of the United States Navy, the fourth Navy ship named for Commodore David Porter (1780–1843), and his son Admiral David Dixon Porter (1813–1891).

Porter was laid down by the Todd Pacific Shipyards, Inc., Seattle, Wash., 6 July 1943; launched 13 March 1944; sponsored by Miss Georgiana Porter Cusachs; and commissioned 24 June 1944.

== History ==
After shakedown off San Diego, Calif., Porter sailed for duty off Adak, Alaska 16 September 1944. On 21 November 1944, with Task Force 92 (TF 92), she made an offensive sweep against the Kurile Islands and bombarded enemy military installations on Matsuwa. She made another offensive sweep against the Japanese naval base at Suribachi Wan, Paramushiru, 5 January 1945, and on the night of 18 February bombarded Kurabu Zaki, Paramushiru. On 15 May Porter participated in the first extensive sweep by surface vessels into the Japanese-controlled Sea of Okhotsk, bombarding Suribachi Wan during the retirement. Porter bombarded Matsuma again on 10 and 11 June. On 25 June, during another sweep of the Sea of Okhotsk, Porter encountered a small convoy and sank a 2,000-ton Japanese merchantman with gunfire.

When V-J Day came Porter was undergoing overhaul at Portland, Oreg., where she remained until 1 September. After escorting Enterprise (CV-6) from Seattle to San Francisco, Porter underwent refresher training at San Diego, then steamed for the east coast. On 3 July 1946 Porter was placed out of commission, in reserve, attached to the U.S. Atlantic Reserve Fleet, berthed at Charleston, S.C.

Recommissioned 9 February 1951, Porter served in Korean waters from 18 June to 14 September 1952 with TF 95 during the naval blockade of North Korea. While there, Porter cruised off the east coast of North Korea between Chongjin and Kosong shelling enemy positions, port cities, watercraft and railroads. Notable encounters included the bombardment of Wonsan Harbor on 3 August 1952, and destroying a North Korean 105 mm artillery battery after exchanging fire near Majonchon on 14 August 1952. A member of the "Trainbusters Club", she destroyed one North Korean train and damaged two.

She was placed out of commission, in reserve, berthed at Norfolk, Va., 10 August 1953. Porter was stricken from the Naval Vessel Register 1 October 1972. She was sold 21 March 1974 and broken up for scrap.

== Honors ==
Porter earned one battle star for World War II service and one battle star for Korean War service.
