= Tom Flanigan =

Tom Flanigan may refer to:

- Tom Flanigan (writer), American actor, writer and comedian
- Tom Flanigan (baseball), American baseball player
- Tom Flanigan (politician), member of the Missouri House of Representatives

== See also ==
- Thomas Flanagan (disambiguation)
- Tommy Flannigan, Scottish footballer
