= USS Porter =

USS Porter may refer to one of several ships in the United States Navy named in honor of Commodore David Porter, and his son, Admiral David Dixon Porter.

- USS Porter (TB-6), a torpedo boat, launched in 1896, served during the Spanish–American War, and stricken in 1912
- USS Porter (DD-59), a Tucker-class destroyer, commissioned in 1916, served in World War I, decommissioned in 1922, transferred to the United States Coast Guard as CG-7, returned to the Navy and scrapped in 1934
- USS Porter (DD-356), the lead ship of her class of destroyers, commissioned in 1936, served in World War II and sunk in battle in October 1942
- USS Porter (DD-800), a Fletcher-class destroyer, commissioned in 1944 and decommissioned in 1953
- USS Porter (DDG-78), an Arleigh Burke-class guided missile destroyer, commissioned in 1999 and actively serving as of 2021

Another ship with a similar name:

- USS William D. Porter (DD-579)
