= John Flannagan =

John Flannagan may refer to:

- John Flannagan (Medal of Honor) (born 1852), American sailor and Medal of Honor recipient
- John Flannagan (priest) (1860–1926), Catholic priest and president of St. Ambrose College
- John Bernard Flannagan (1895–1942) American sculptor
- John W. Flannagan, Jr. (1885–1955), American politician

== See also ==
- John Flanagan (disambiguation)
