= Flannigan =

Flannigan is a common Irish surname, and may refer to:

== People ==
- Allen J. Flannigan, American politician
- Iain Flannigan, Scottish professional footballer
- Katherine Flannigan, Scottish murderer
- Katherine Mary Flannigan, Irish American immigrant and novelist
- Maureen Flannigan, American actress
- Richard C. Flannigan, American jurist
- Tracy Flannigan, independent film maker

=== Fictional characters ===
- Blair Flannigan, a fictional character in the Yu-Gi-Oh! GX anime series
- Jezzie Flannigan, a fictional character in the James Patterson novel Along Came a Spider

== Places ==
- Flannigan Township, Hamilton County, Illinois
- South Flannigan Township, Hamilton County, Illinois

== See also ==
- Flanigan
- Flannagan (disambiguation)
- Flanagan (disambiguation)
