= Action of 31 October 1803 =

- Part of First Barbary War
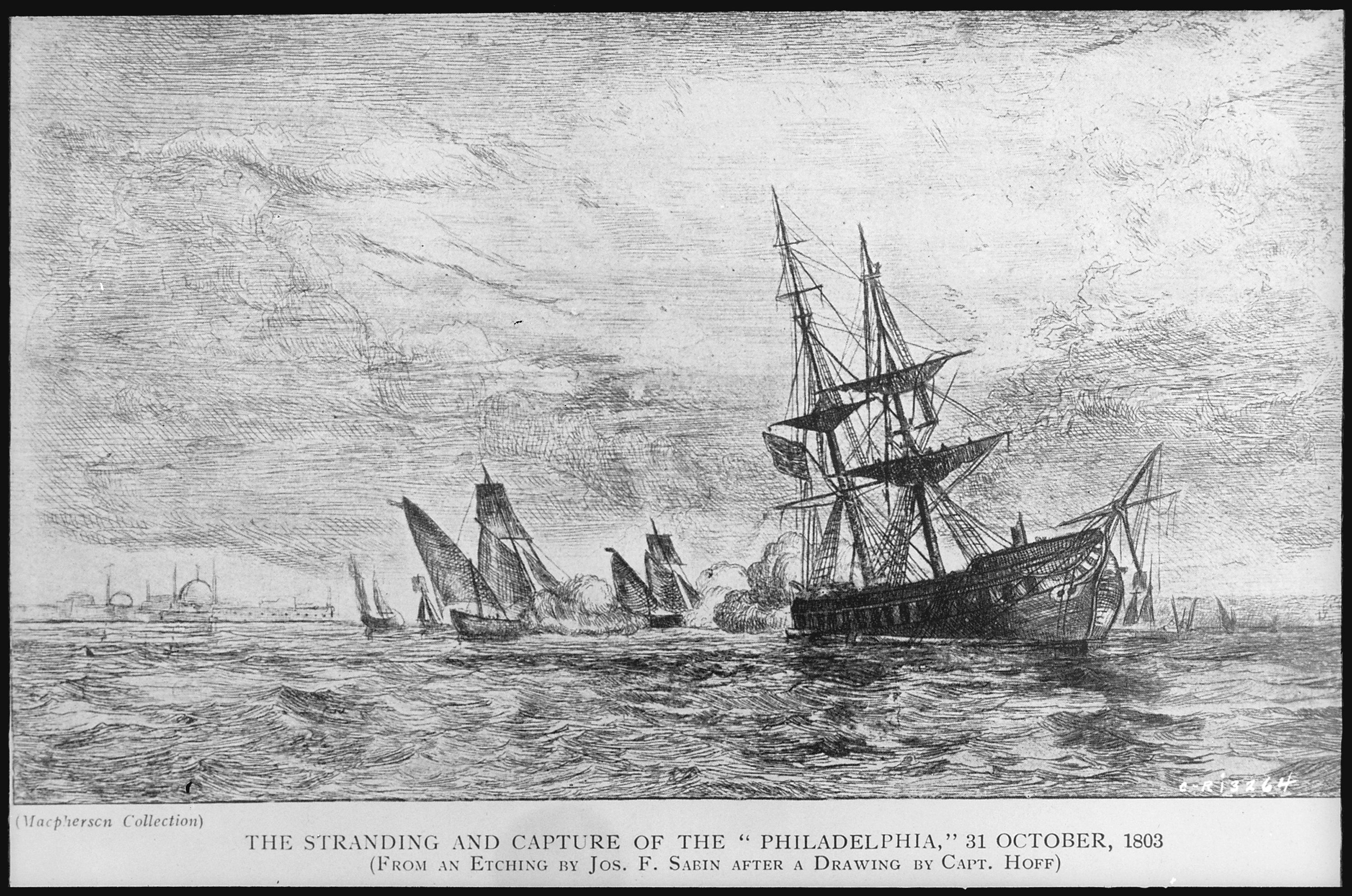
- Capture of USS Philadelphia
Date	31 October 1803
Location	Near Tripoli (present day Libya)
Result	Tripolitanian victory

Belligerents
United States	Tripolitania

Commanders and leaders
William Bainbridge (POW); David C. Porter (POW)	Murad Reis

Strength
Frigate Philadelphia	9 vessels

Casualties and losses
Philadelphia captured 307 captured	None

The Action of 31 October 1803 was a naval engagement between the United States Navy and the Tripolitan Navy during the First Barbary War. During the blockade of Tripoli, USS Philadelphia ran aground while chasing a Tripolitan ship. Philadelphia was captured by the Tripolitans and enslaved its entire crew. The capture of Philadelphia was a major setback for the Americans and was considered humiliating.

== Prelude ==
In 1803, the US captain, Edward Preble, ordered the USS Philadelphia and USS Vixen to blockade Tripoli. The two ships departed from Malta and arrived there on October 7. The captain of Philadelphia, William Bainbridge, noticed that some Tripolitan ships were near the city. He ordered USS Vixen to sail westward. A few days later, Bainbridge continued to blockade without achieving much.

== Action ==
On October 31, the US captain noticed a twelve-gun Tripolitan ship, Mastico, attempting to enter the city after a voyage from Derna. The USS Philadelphia chased it, but it could not prevent it from entering the port. The navigation of the ship was led by David Porter. The Philadelphia decided to retreat; however, as they retreated from the shore, it ran aground upon the reefs four and a half miles from land. The Americans attempted to get the ship off the rock by removing loads. The Americans threw guns, cannons, materials, and supplies, but that failed to move it.

At this time, the Tripolitans saw what happened and dispatched their gunboats to capture the ship. The Philadelphia ran ashore between 11:30 am and 12:30 pm. The Tripolitan gunboats began firing at it all afternoon. Around 3:00 pm, Bainbridge held a conference with all officers and asked them how to save the ship. The officers replied that their only solution was to surrender. The cannons on the ship replied but were ineffective as it fired over the gunboats. Around 4:00 pm, with no solutions, the Americans lowered their flag to surrender.

Bainbridge sent a boat to the Tripolitans to assure their surrender. While this was happening, some Tripolitans attempted to sink the ship but failed. The Tripolitans looted and sacked anything valuable they could take. The majority of the Americans preferred to die instead. After this, the Americans were taken ashore, where they separated the officers and personnel. A total of 307 Americans were captured.

== Aftermath ==
Preble heard about the disaster on November 24 from the British. Preble was greatly shocked by the news, as he expected the war to end by spring 1804. The capture of USS Philadelphia changed the course of the war. He reportedly told Robert Smith, secretary of the US Navy:

"Our national character will sustain injury with the Barbarians. Would to God, that the Officers and crew of the Philadelphia, had one and all, determined to prefer death to slavery.

The loss of USS Philadelphia and the capture of 307 men created political impact in the United States. The political enemies of the US president, Thomas Jefferson, blamed him for the loss. The Philadelphia Aurora newspaper called the loss a "national calamity, not just a disaster for Jefferson's administration."

Preble began making preparations to blockade Tripoli. The Tripolitans knew about his movements from the papers captured in the ship detailing the US movements in the Mediterranean. The Tripolitans managed to move the ship again and used the American prisoners to repair it and retrieve the dumped guns.

== Sources ==
- Gary Edward Wilson (1984), American Prisoners in the Barbary Nations, 1784-1816.
- Brian Kilmeade & Don Yaeger (2017), Summary and Analysis of Thomas Jefferson and the Tripoli Pirates: The Forgotten War That Changed American History.
- Thomas Williams (2012), American Honor, The Story of Admiral Charles Stewart.
