= USS Supply (1846) =

Cargo ship of the United States Navy

- USS Supply, probably at the New York Navy Yard after the Civil War

History

United States
- Name: USS Supply
- Acquired: 1846
- Commissioned: 19 December 1846
- Decommissioned: 17 December 1848
- Recommissioned: 17 February 1849
- Decommissioned: 7 July 1870
- Recommissioned: 21 February 1871
- Decommissioned: 23 April 1879
- Fate: Sold 3 May 1884

General characteristics
- Type: Sailing ship
- Tonnage: 547
- Speed: 11.5 knots (21.3 km/h; 13.2 mph)
- Complement: 40 officers and enlisted men
- Armament: 4 × 24-pounder (10.9-kg) guns

The first USS Supply was a ship-rigged sailing vessel which served as a stores ship in the United States Navy. She saw service in the Mexican–American War and the American Civil War.

== Service history ==
Supply was purchased by the U.S. Navy at Boston, Massachusetts, late in 1846 for service during the Mexican–American War. She was delivered to the United States Government at the Boston Navy Yard on 8 December 1846, and was commissioned there on 19 December 1846, Lieutenant John Calhoun in command.

=== Mexican–American War ===
Supply sailed for the Gulf of Mexico on 21 January 1847 and supported the Home Squadron's operations against Mexico serving as a stores ship until late in the summer when Commodore Matthew C. Perry reduced the size of his force in Mexican waters after the American evacuation of Tabasco. Supply returned to New York City on 26 September 1847.

=== Dead Sea expedition ===
Exactly two months later, on 26 November 1847, the ship, now commanded by Lieutenant William F. Lynch, departed New York Harbor and proceeded to the Mediterranean with equipment and stores to be used in an expedition to explore the Dead Sea, specifically to investigate whether the sea was of volcanic origin or not. She reached Gibraltar on the afternoon of 19 December 1847, and proceeded to Port Mahón with supplies for the Mediterranean Squadron. There she was delayed in quarantine for two weeks because of two cases of smallpox which occurred on board. After finally delivering stores to the American warships, she resumed her voyage to the Levant on 4 February 1848.

After touching at Malta on 9 February 1848, the ship reached Smyrna in the Ottoman Empire on 16 February 1848. There Lieutenant Lynch left the ship and proceeded to Constantinople to obtain permission from Sultan Abdülmecid I for the expedition before returning on board on 11 March 1848. After twice getting underway and being forced back to Smyrna by bad weather, the ship finally sailed to Syria and reached Beirut on 25 March 1848, and the expedition left the ship and proceeded on to the Jordan River and the Dead Sea. Lynch's report of the exploration was still cited in the 1970s as a primary source of information on the area.

Meanwhile, Supply cruised in the Mediterranean. When she returned, late in August 1848, she learned that the exploring party had successfully completed their undertaking and that Lynch, forced by the poor health of his men, had chartered a small French brig to carry them to Malta. Supply then headed west and reached Malta on 11 September 1848. There, Lynch and the entire expedition party reembarked, and the ship returned to the United States. She reached Norfolk, Virginia, on 8 December 1848 and was decommissioned there on 17 December 1848.

=== Tripoli mission ===
Recommissioned on 17 February 1849, the stores ship sailed once more for the Mediterranean on 8 March 1849, carrying the United States consul to Tripoli. After disembarking her passenger and delivering stores to the ships of the Mediterranean Squadron, Supply returned home, via Brazil, arrived at Norfolk on 4 September 1849, and was laid up there on 11 September 1849.

=== Commodore Perry's Japan expedition ===
Reactivated on 22 November 1849, Supply sailed early in January 1850 and proceeded around Cape Horn to the California coast, which was overflowing with "49ers," participants in the California Gold Rush who had been drawn there by word of a gold strike at Sutter's Mill. Two years later, she returned to New York to prepare for service in the West Indies Squadron; however, she was assigned instead to the East India Squadron as stores ship in support of Commodore Matthew C. Perry's expedition to Japan. She entered Edo Bay on 19 March 1854 during his second visit to Japan. After serving on the China coast, she returned to New York in February 1855.

=== Camel Corps mission ===
Supply's next assignment was perhaps the most unusual duty of her career. United States Secretary of War Jefferson Davis was extremely interested in developing the territory recently acquired by the United States from Mexico as a result of its victory in the Mexican–American War and arranged for an expedition to obtain camels for experimental use in a United States Army Camel Corps in the desert west of the Rocky Mountains.

Supply was retrofitted to accommodate a number of camels. The ship, commanded by Lieutenant David Dixon Porter – who later would win fame in the American Civil War –departed New York on 4 June 1855 and headed for the Mediterranean to obtain the camels. The ship ported in Tunisia, Turkey and Egypt, but due to the Crimean War, camels were in short supply in those areas. The ship reached Smyrna in the Ottoman Empire on 30 January 1856, loaded 21 (some reports say 31) camels, and sailed on 15 February 1856 for the Gulf of Mexico. Porter delivered the animals to Indianola, Texas, in May 1856. The ship had reached the halfway point on this curious mission for she was soon on her way back to the Levant for another load of camels which she transferred to Suwanee on the Mississippi River early in February 1857.

=== Paraguay Expedition ===
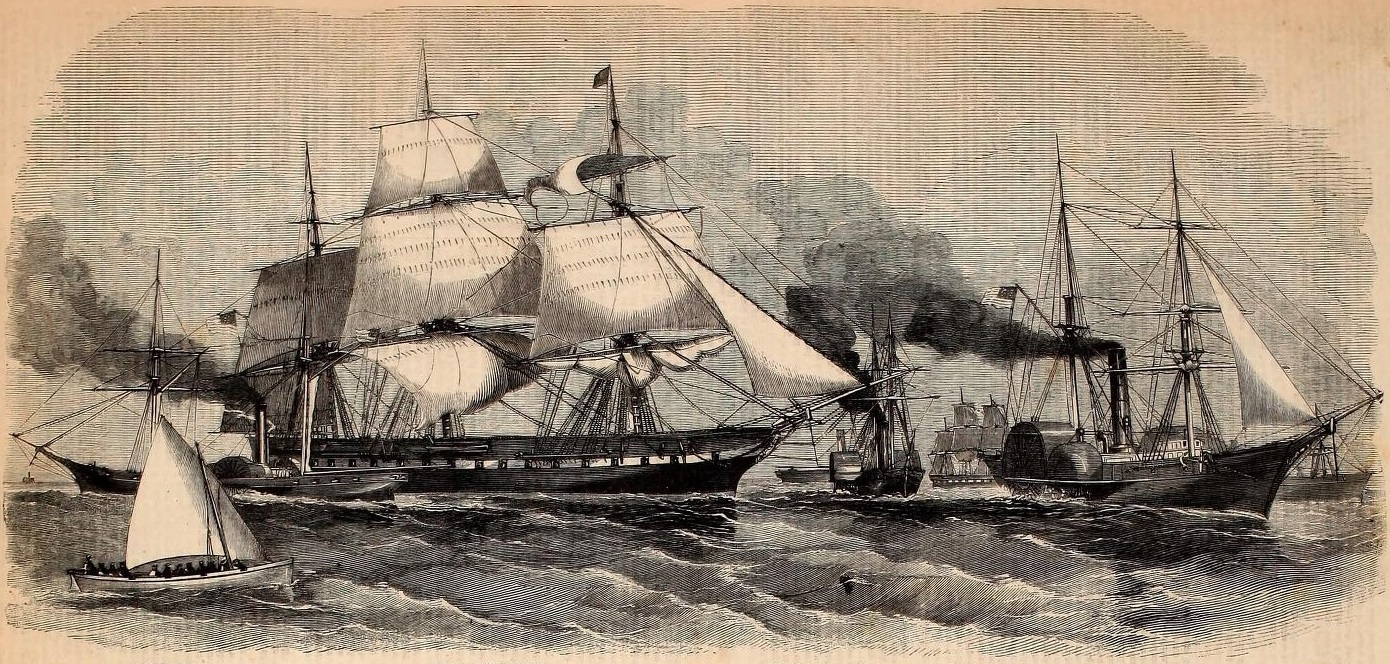
The Paraguay Squadron (Harper's Weekly, New York, 16 October 1858).

Next in Supply's string of interesting assignments came service in a special squadron assembled and sent to South American waters to support the Paraguay Expedition, a diplomatic effort to settle differences between the United States and Paraguay which resulted from an incident in which Paraguayans had fired upon the U.S. Navy sidewheel gunboat USS Water Witch. Supply arrived with the squadron off Asunción, Paraguay, on 25 January 1859 and stood by during negotiations which resulted in a Paraguayan apology and an indemnity which settled the affair.

A cruise with the Africa Squadron and duty on the United States East Coast and in the Gulf of Mexico followed.

=== American Civil War ===
January 1861 found Supply in Pensacola Bay, Florida, with the secession of the Southern states beginning, and, on 16 January 1861 she sailed north with the families and possessions of the officers and men who had been stationed at Pensacola Navy Yard and arrived at New York on 4 February 1861.

The ship sailed south on 15 March 1861 carrying U.S. Army troops and United States Marines. She anchored in the harbor at Pensacola, Florida, on 7 April 1861 and, on 11 April 1861, landed them at night to reinforce Fort Pickens. The American Civil War broke out the following day when Confederate forces opened fire on Fort Sumter in South Carolina.

Throughout the Civil War, Supply supported the blockading squadrons on the United States East Coast and in the Gulf of Mexico. She took her sole prize of the conflict on 29 January 1862. when she captured the schooner Stephen Hart, which was carrying arms and ammunition, south of Sarasota, Florida. Her services, although undramatic, enabled many warships to remain on station in the blockade and thus helped substantially to shorten the war.

=== Post–Civil War service ===
After the end of hostilities, Supply served in the Brazil Squadron in 1866, and in the Far East in 1867 and 1868. After being laid up from 27 June 1868 to 5 November 1869, the ship sailed for Europe, but soon returned and was decommissioned at New York on 7 July 1870.

On 21 February 1871, Supply was recommissioned and sailed eastward across the Atlantic Ocean carrying supplies for the citizens of France left destitute by the Franco-Prussian War. In the spring of 1872, the ship carried a relief crew to the sloop-of-war Lancaster in the South Atlantic Squadron and, the following year, transported the American exhibits to Austria-Hungary for the Vienna Exposition of 1873. Following two years in ordinary at New York, the ship returned to Europe to bring back the exhibits from Vienna. Later that year, she made a training cruise with boys from New York. Then, in 1877, she served as a tender to the steam frigate Minnesota, which was serving as a training ship at the time.

In 1878, Supply sailed to Europe with the American exhibits for the Paris Exposition of 1878 and brought them home in March 1879. On 26 October 1878, while off Le Havre, France, Boatswain's Mate John Flannagan rescued a fellow sailor from drowning, for which he was awarded the Medal of Honor.

On 27 January 1879, Supply collided with the British barque Diadem in the Atlantic Ocean. Diadem's crew abandoned ship and were landed at Madeira.

Supply was decommissioned at New York on 23 April 1879 and was towed to Philadelphia, Pennsylvania, where she was laid up until she was sold on 3 May 1884 to M. H. Gregory of Great Neck, Long Island, New York.

== See also ==
- Union Navy
