= Mike Flanagan =

Mike or Michael Flanagan may refer to:

== Sports ==
- Michael Flanagan (cricketer) (1842–1890), English cricketer
- Mike Flanagan (American football) (born 1973), American football center
- Mike Flanagan (baseball) (1951–2011), pitcher and television broadcaster
- Mike Flanagan (footballer) (born 1952), English former professional footballer and manager
- Mike Flanagan (pole vaulter) (born 1941), American pole vaulter, 1964 NCAA runner-up for the USC Trojans track and field team

== Others ==
- Michael Flanagan (councillor) (1833–1931), Irish nationalist councillor
- Michael P. Flanagan (educator), state superintendent in Michigan, 2005–2015
- Michael Flanagan (American politician) (born 1962), American politician and former United States representative from Illinois
- Mike Flanagan (Irish-Israeli soldier) (1926–2014), British soldier who stole two tanks and deserted to join the Israeli tank corps
- Mike Flanagan (filmmaker) (born 1978), American film director
- Micky Flanagan, English comedian
- Mike Flanagan, banjo player for the Flanagan Brothers
- Mike Flanagan, a character in My Brother's Husband
