= Kyle Flanagan =

Kyle Flanagan may refer to:

- Kyle Flanagan (ice hockey)
- Kyle Flanagan (rugby league), Australian rugby league footballer
