= John Flanagan =

John Flanagan or Jack Flanagan may refer to:

== Sportspeople ==
- Jack Flanagan (footballer) (1902–1989), English footballer
- John Flanagan (hammer thrower) (1868–1938), Irish-American three-time Olympic champion in athletics
- John Flanagan (Limerick hurler) (born 1956), Irish hurler
- John Flanagan (Scottish footballer) (1942–2013), played for St. Johnstone, Partick Thistle and Clyde
- John Flanagan (swimmer) (born 1975), Hawaiian swimmer/coach
- John Flanagan (Tipperary hurler) (1947–1994), Irish hurler

== Others ==
- John Flanagan (author) (1944–2026), Australian fantasy author
- John Flanagan (sculptor) (1865–1952), designed the Washington U.S. quarter dollar coin
- John C. Flanagan (1906–1996), pioneer of aviation psychology
- John J. Flanagan (born 1961), New York State Senator
- John Mack Flanagan (1946–2018), American radio DJ
- John T. Flanagan (1906–1996), professor of literature
- Jack Flanagan (Australian politician) (John Flanagan, 1888–1949), Australian politician
- Jack Flanagan (New Hampshire politician) (born 1957)
- John Flanagan, British actor, in Thriller
- John C. Flanagan, judge who lived in the John C. Flanagan House in Peoria, Illinois

== See also ==
- Jon Flanagan (born 1993), English footballer
- John Flannagan (disambiguation)
