= David Porter (naval officer) =

American naval officer and diplomat (1780–1843)

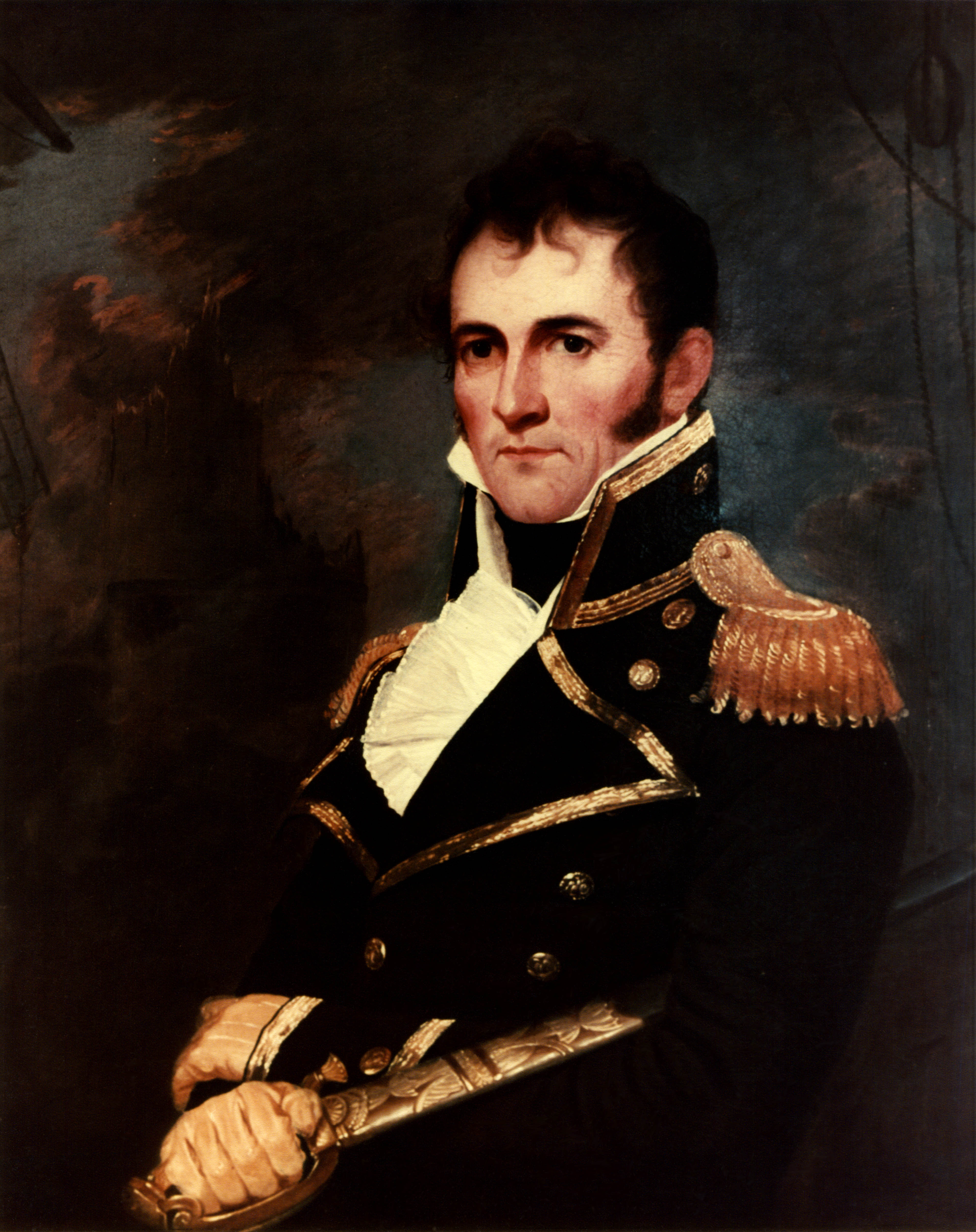
- A portrait of Porter as a captain in the United States Navy

United States Minister Resident to the Ottoman Empire
- In office May 23, 1840 – March 3, 1843
- President: Martin Van Buren; William Henry Harrison; John Tyler
- Preceded by: Office established
- Succeeded by: Dabney S. Carr

Chargé d'Affaires of the United States to the Ottoman Empire
- In office September 13, 1831 – May 23, 1840
- President: Andrew Jackson; Martin Van Buren
- Preceded by: George W. Erving
- Succeeded by: Himself as Minister Resident

Personal details
- Born: February 1, 1780 Boston, Massachusetts
- Died: March 3, 1843 (aged 63) Constantinople, Ottoman Empire
- Spouse: Evelina Anderson
- Children: 10, including David Dixon Porter

Military service
- Allegiance: United States (1798–1825); Mexico (1826–1829)
- Branch/service: United States Navy; Mexican Navy
- Rank: Commodore
- Commands: USS Amphitheatre; USS Constitution; USS Enterprise; New Orleans station (US Navy); USS Essex; USS Firefly; West Indies Squadron
- Battles/wars: Quasi War; Constellation vs L'Insurgente; Action of 1 January 1800 (WIA); First Barbary War; Action of 2 June 1803 (WIA); Action of 31 October 1803 (POW); War of 1812; USS Essex vs HMS Alert; Action off Charles Island; Nuku Hiva Campaign; Battle of Valparaiso; West Indies Anti-Piracy Operations

David Porter (February 1, 1780 – March 3, 1843) was an American naval officer and diplomat. Porter commanded a number of U.S. naval ships. He saw service in the First Barbary War, the War of 1812 and in the West Indies. During the War of 1812, Porter captained USS Essex, and originated the American motto of "Free trade and sailors' rights". When Porter raided Spanish territory without orders in 1822, he was court-martialed and resigned his commission. Afterwards, Porter joined and became commander-in-chief of the Mexican Navy.

Porter County, Indiana is named after him.

== Early life ==
Born in Boston, Massachusetts, Porter served in the Quasi-War with France first as midshipman aboard USS Constellation, participating in the capture of L'Insurgente on February 9, 1799; then as 1st lieutenant of Experiment; and finally in command of USS Amphitheatre. During the First Barbary War (1801–1807), Porter was first lieutenant of Enterprise, New York, and Philadelphia and was taken prisoner when the latter ran aground in Tripoli harbor on October 31, 1803. After his release on June 3, 1805, he remained in the Mediterranean as acting captain of USS Constitution and later captain of Enterprise.

== Early military career ==
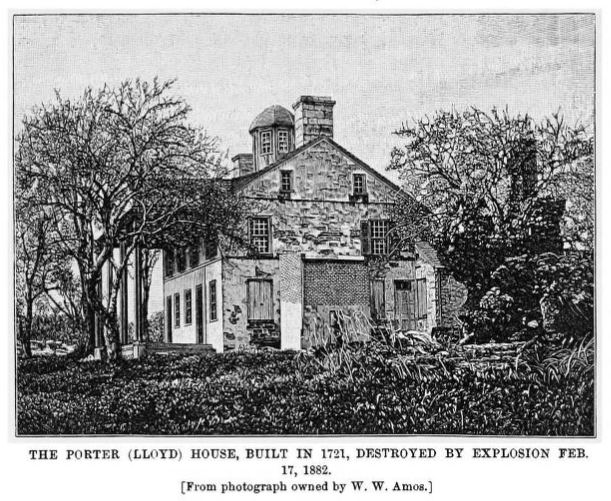
Porter (Lloyd) House

Porter married Evalina Anderson, the daughter of William Anderson, and together they had ten children who survived, including six sons. One of these, David Dixon Porter, became an admiral in the United States Navy. Porter purchased the grand home built by the judge and politician David Lloyd in Chester, Pennsylvania. He made many additions, and the home became known as the Porter House. It was destroyed by explosion in 1882.

Porter's father, David Porter Sr., met and befriended another naval veteran of the American Revolutionary War, George Farragut, from the Balearic island of Minorca. In late spring 1808, David Sr. suffered sunstroke, and Farragut took him into his home, where his wife Elizabeth cared for him. Already weakened by tuberculosis, he died on June 22, 1808. Elizabeth Farragut died of yellow fever the same day. Motherless, the Farragut children were to be placed with friends and relatives.

While visiting Farragut and his family a short time later to express thanks for their care of his father and sympathy for their loss, Commodore Porter offered to take eight-year-old James Glasgow Farragut into his own household. Young James readily agreed. In 1809 he moved with Porter to Washington, where he met Secretary of the Navy Paul Hamilton and expressed his wish for a midshipman's appointment. Hamilton promised that the appointment would be made as soon as he reached the age of ten; as it happened, the commission came through on December 17, 1810, six months before the boy reached his tenth birthday. When James went to sea soon after with his adoptive father, he changed his name from James to David, and it is as David Glasgow Farragut that he is remembered.

== Quasi-War ==
Porter served in the Quasi-War with France. He was appointed a midshipman on April 16, 1798. Assigned to Constellation under the command of John Rodgers, he saw action in the battle against L'Insurgente, notably saving the mast by cutting away slings after it was damaged. He was then selected as one of twelve men assigned to take possession of L'Insurgente after the Americans captured her. He was promoted to lieutenant on October 8, 1799. As lieutenant he served as second in command of the schooner USS Experiment during the action of 1 January 1800, in which he got shot in his arm.

== First Barbary War ==
In April 1802, he was stationed on USS Chesapeake. He was promoted to master commandant on April 22, 1806.

== New Orleans station and telegraphy ==
He was in charge of the naval forces at the New Orleans station (US Navy) from 1808 to 1810. During his tenure at New Orleans, he setup an optical telegraph network, inspired by the one established by the French, and copied by the British.

== War of 1812 ==
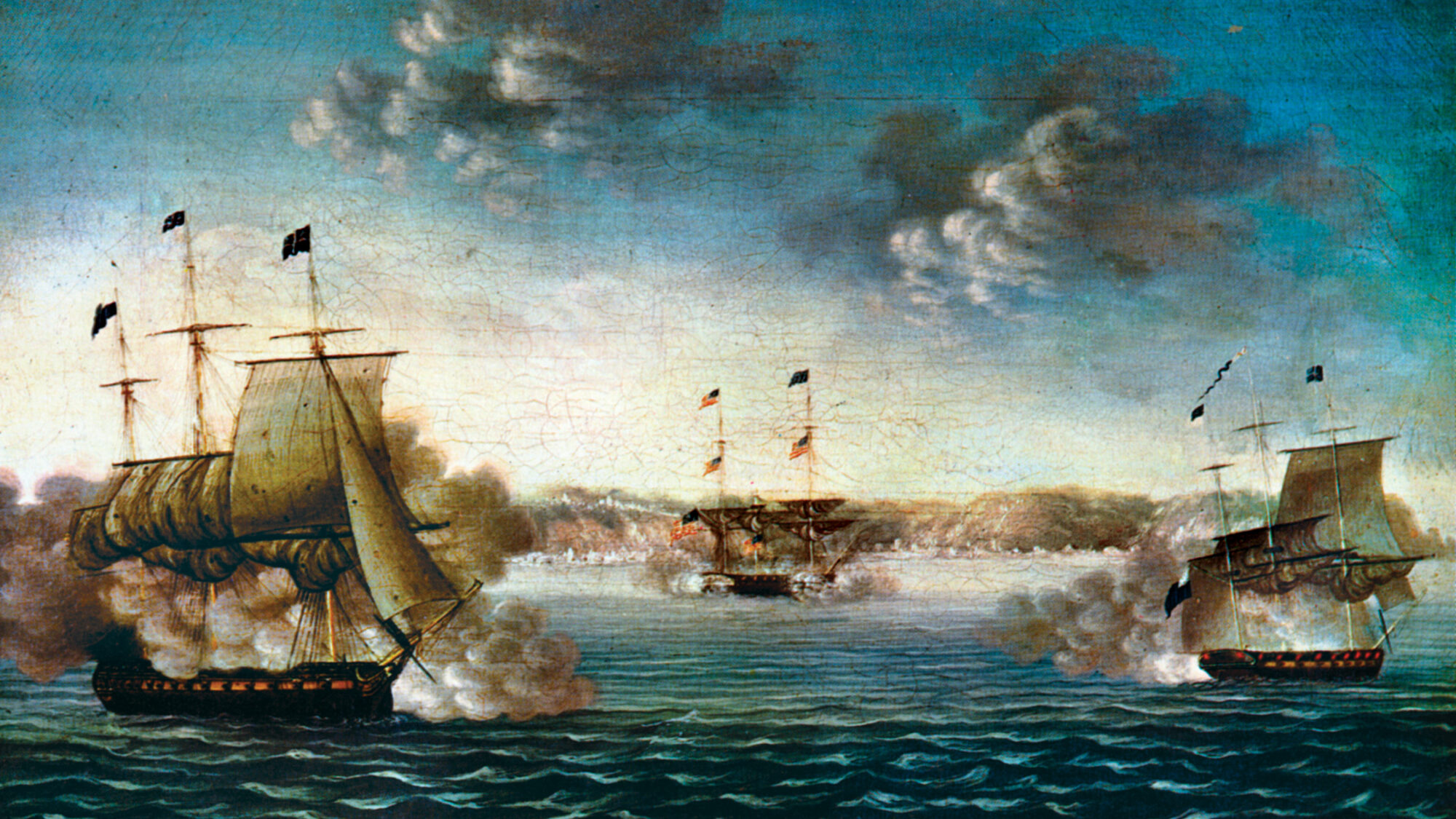
c. 1819 painting of the Battle of Valparaíso

With the outbreak of the War of 1812, Porter was promoted to captain on July 2, 1812, and was assigned as commander of USS Essex. He sailed out of New York harbor with a banner proclaiming "Free trade and sailors' rights" flying from the foretopgallant mast. On August 13, 1812, Porter captured the Royal Navy sloop HMS Alert as well as several British merchantmen.

In February 1813 he sailed Essex around Cape Horn and cruised the Pacific, attacking British whalers. Porter's first action in the Pacific was the capture of the Peruvian merchantman Nereyda, releasing the captive American whalers on board. Over the next year, Porter captured 12 British whalers and 360 sailors. In June 1813, Porter released his prisoners, on the condition that they not fight against the United States until they were formally exchanged for American prisoners of war. Porter's usual tactic was to raise British colors to allay the whaler's suspicions, then once invited on board, he would reveal his true allegiance and purpose.

Porter and his fleet spent October–December 1813 resting and regrouping in the Marquesas Islands, which he claimed in the name of the United States and renamed them the Madison Islands, in honor of President James Madison. On March 28, 1814, Porter encountered British frigate HMS Phoebe and the sloop-of-war HMS Cherub and the battle of Valparaiso ensued. He surrendered to British Captain James Hillyar after his ship became too disabled to offer any resistance.

Porter and the surviving crew set sail on April 27, 1814. On July 6, Porter landed at Babylon, Long Island.

Porter was granted the command of a 44 gun frigate under construction, originally named Columbia, now renamed as Essex. Prior to its completion, it was destroyed during the Burning of Washington In October, Porter was named as commander of the Fulton, a steam frigate under construction in New York. With little to do whilst awaiting the completion of the ship, in mid-October he proposed to assemble a squadron of schooners, to operate from southern ports, to disrupt British shipping in the West Indies. Permission was granted. By December, he had three vessels. In early February 1815, he reported to the Secretary of the Navy that several factors had hindered his progress. The project became irrelevant after ratification of the peace treaty was proclaimed on February 18, 1815.

== West Indies ==
From 1815 to 1822, he was a member of the Board of Navy Commissioners but gave up this post to command the expedition for suppressing piracy in the West Indies (1823–1825). While in the West Indies suppressing piracy, Porter invaded the town of Fajardo, Puerto Rico (then a Spanish colony) to avenge the jailing of an officer from his fleet. The U.S. government did not sanction Porter's act, and he was court-martialed upon his return to the U.S. Porter resigned from the U.S. Navy on August 18, 1826, and, shortly after, was appointed as commander-in-chief of the Mexican Navy. He held this position from 1826 to 1829.

== Later life and death ==
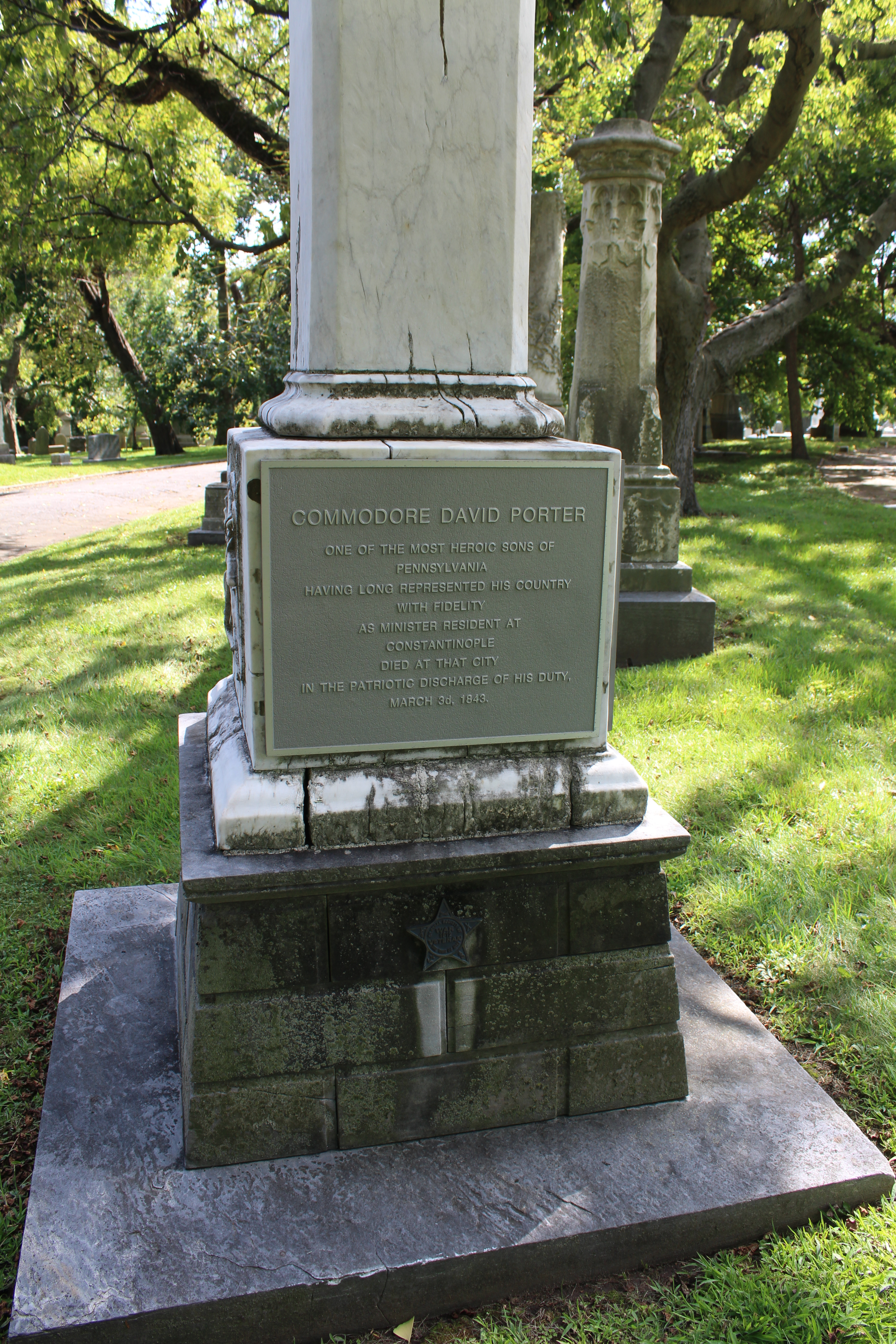
Commodore David Porter Memorial in the Woodlands Cemetery

He left the Mexican navy in 1829 and was appointed United States Minister to the Barbary States.

He was appointed as Chargé d'Affaires to the Ottoman Empire by President Andrew Jackson in 1831 and was promoted to Minister Resident in 1840.

He died on March 3, 1843, in Constantinople, Ottoman Empire, while serving as United States Minister Resident to the Ottoman Empire. He was buried in the cemetery of the Philadelphia Naval Asylum, and then in 1845 reburied in the Woodlands Cemetery in Philadelphia, Pennsylvania.

== Dates of rank ==
- Midshipman - April 16, 1798
- Lieutenant - October 8, 1799
- Master Commandant - April 22, 1806
- Captain - July 2, 1812
- Resigned - August 18, 1826

== In popular culture ==
- Porter is played by Jeff Chandler in the film Yankee Buccaneer (1952).

== Legacy ==
- Several U.S. Navy ships have been named USS Porter after him.
- The town of Porter and Porter County in Northwest Indiana are named after David Porter. In 1836 the county seat of Porter County, Indiana was originally named Portersville, also named for David Porter. It was changed to Valparaiso in 1837, named for Porter's participation in the naval action near Valparaíso, Chile during the War of 1812.
