= Charlie Flannagan =

Australian rules footballer (1933–2025)

Personal information
- Full name: Charles Donald Flannagan
- Born: 24 October 1933; Omeo, Victoria, Australia
- Died: 2 August 2025 (aged 91); Yarram, Victoria, Australia
- Original team: Omeo
- Height: 185 cm (6 ft 1 in)
- Weight: 84 kg (185 lb)

Playing career
Years	Club	Games (Goals)
1955–58	Richmond	26 (0)

Charles Donald Flannagan (24 October 1933 – 2 August 2025) was an Australian rules footballer who played with Richmond in the Victorian Football League (VFL).

== VFL career ==
Recruited from Omeo where he won the 1954 Omeo & District Football League best and fairest, Flannagan was originally on match permits during 1955. While he was tall enough to be a ruckman he played most of his 26 senior games as a backman. In 1959 he accepted the role of captain coach of Warragul in the Latrobe Valley Football League. Later on he moved to Yarram and coached the local team to a premiership in 1962. He later transferred to Won Wron.

== Death ==
Flannagan died in Yarram, Victoria on 2 August 2025, at the age of 91.
