= Flanagan =

Flanagan may refer to:

- Flanagan (surname), a common Irish surname, people with that surname
- Flanagan (model), early page 3 girl
- Flanagan, Illinois
- Flanagan Island, an island in the United States Virgin Islands
- Flanagan (1985 film)
- Flanagan, a band fronted by Mark Flanagan (musician)

== See also ==
- Edith M. Flanigen
