= Terry Flanagan =

Terry Flanagan may refer to:

- Terry Flanagan (boxer) (born 1989), English boxer
- Terry Flanagan (footballer) (born 1950), Irish Association football (soccer) player
- Terry Flanagan (ice hockey) (1956–1991), Canadian ice hockey player and coach
- Terry Flanagan (rugby league) (born 1960), English rugby league footballer of the 1970s and 1980s
