= Ed Flanagan =

Ed or Edward Flanagan may refer to:

== Sports ==
- Ed Flanagan (American football) (1944–2023), American football player
- Ed Flanagan (athlete) (1910–1978), American hammer thrower
- Ed Flanagan (baseball) (1861–1926), American baseball player

== Others ==
- Ed Flanagan (politician) (1950–2017), American politician
- Edward Flanagan (actor) (1880–1925), American comedic actor
- Edward J. Flanagan (1886–1948), Irish-American Roman Catholic priest
- Edward Vanes Flanagan or Dennis O'Keefe (1908–1968), American actor

== See also ==
- Edward Flanigan (1874–1932), American judge
