= Daniel M. Flanigan =

American politician

Daniel M. Flanigan (November 2, 1883 – November 26, 1946) was an American politician.

Flanigan was born in New York City, New York. He lived in Chicago, Illinois and went to the Chicago parochial and public schools. Flanigan worked in the office of the Cook County Treasurer and in the office of the Chicago Corporate Counsel. Flanigan served in the Illinois House of Representatives from 1939 until his death in 1946. He was a Democrat. Flanigan was a political protege of Michael Kenna who served on the Chicago City Council. Flanigan died in Chicago, Illinois.
