= Flannagan mac Ceallach =

Irish poet

Flannagan mac Ceallach was an Irish poet. He is known almost exclusively from three verses of a poem he composed upon the death of King Áed Findliath in 879.

His poem was preserved in that year's entry in the Annals of the Four Masters.

Below is an English translation (the original was written in Irish)

Long is the wintry night/with rough gusts of wind/Under pressing grief we encounter it/since the red-speared king of the noble house liveth not.

It is awful to watch how/the waves heave from the bottom;/To them may be compared all/those who with us lament him.

A generous, wise, staid man,/of whose renown wide-ruling Teamhair was full/A shielded oak that sheltered/the palace of Milidh's sons.

Master of the games of the fair-hilled Tailtin/King of Teamhair of an hundred conflicts/Chief of Fodhla the noble/Aedh of Oileach who died too soon.

Mournful, not forgotten,/the departure from this world;/Stony, not merciful/is the heart of the son of man;

No greater than small flies/are the kings of Adam's race with him/A yew without any charge of blemish upon him/was he of the long flowing hair.

He may, or may not, be identical with a namesake King of Brega who was killed at the battle of Oldba in 895.
