= Flanagan Island =

Island in the United States Virgin Islands

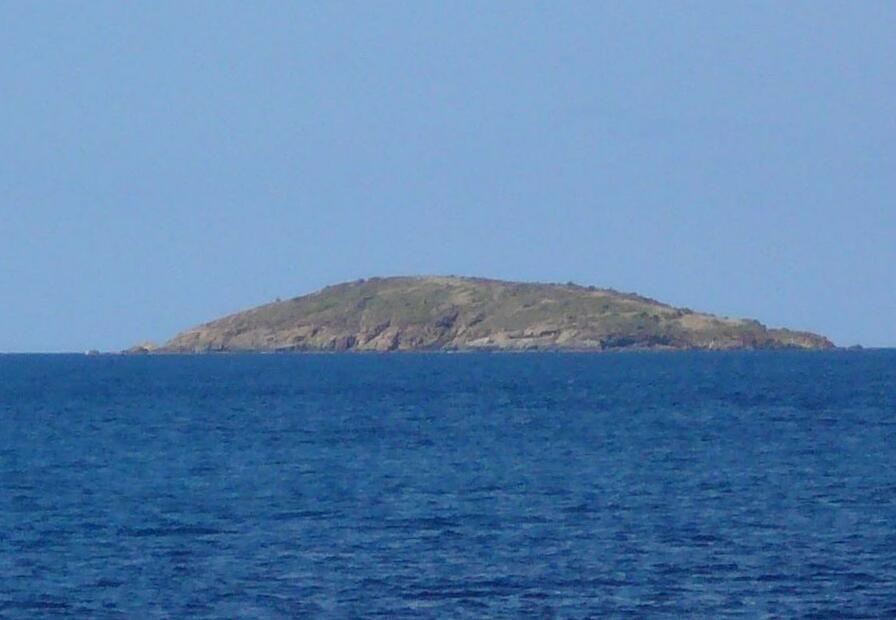
- Flanagan Island

- Location in the Caribbean Flanagan Island (the Caribbean)

Geography
- Location: Caribbean Sea
- Coordinates: 18°19′32″N 64°39′3″W

Administration
- United States; United States Virgin Islands
- Federal Department: U.S. Department of the Interior
- Federal Agency: U.S. Fish and Wildlife Service
- Capital city: Washington, D.C.
- Largest settlement: New York City
- President: Donald Trump

Flanagan Island (sometimes referred to in older charts as Witch Island) is an island located within the Virgin Islands archipelago in the Caribbean and forms part of the U.S. Virgin Islands.

It is located just off of the eastern end of St. John Island. For many years the island fell between the claimed maritime boundaries of the British Virgin Islands and U.S. Virgin Islands. However, the United Kingdom Foreign and Commonwealth Office formally relinquished its claim to Flanagan Island in 1977 in an agreement with a US delegation headed by David Colson, Deputy Assistant Secretary for Oceans, US Department of State.

Flanagan Island is uninhabited and is regarded as a nature reserve. However, it is not part of Virgin Islands National Park, which accounts for approximately 75% of St. John and adjacent islands.
