= Ruth Flanagan =

American politician (died 1985)

Member of the Connecticut House of Representatives from Windsor Locks
- In office 1959–1967 Serving with Henry M. Broderick
- Preceded by: Phillip Greene; Alfred J. Gragnolati
- Succeeded by: Seat eliminated

Personal details
- Born: Ruth Wallace; 1916 or 1917 Windsor Locks, Connecticut, U.S.
- Died: December 13, 1985 (aged 68) Hartford, Connecticut, U.S.
- Party: Democratic
- Spouse: James J. Flanagan
- Children: 2

Ruth Flanagan (1916 or 1917 – December 13, 1985) was an American politician who served in the Connecticut House of Representatives from 1959 to 1967, representing the town of Windsor Locks as a Democrat.

== Personal life ==
Ruth Wallace was born in 1916 or 1917 in Windsor Locks, Connecticut. Her father, George M. Wallace, was Windsor Locks' state representative from 1931 to 1937. She married James J. Flanagan and had two daughters.

== Political career ==
A Democrat, Flanagan was first elected to the Connecticut House of Representatives in 1958, and she served alongside fellow Democrat Henry M. Broderick until 1967. She and Broderick had no successors as Connecticut's 1965 constitutional convention eliminated single-town districts, beginning with the 1966 election cycle.

== Death ==
Flanagan died on December 13, 1985, at Hartford Hospital in Hartford, Connecticut. She was 68.
