= David Dixon Porter =

United States Navy admiral (1813–1891)

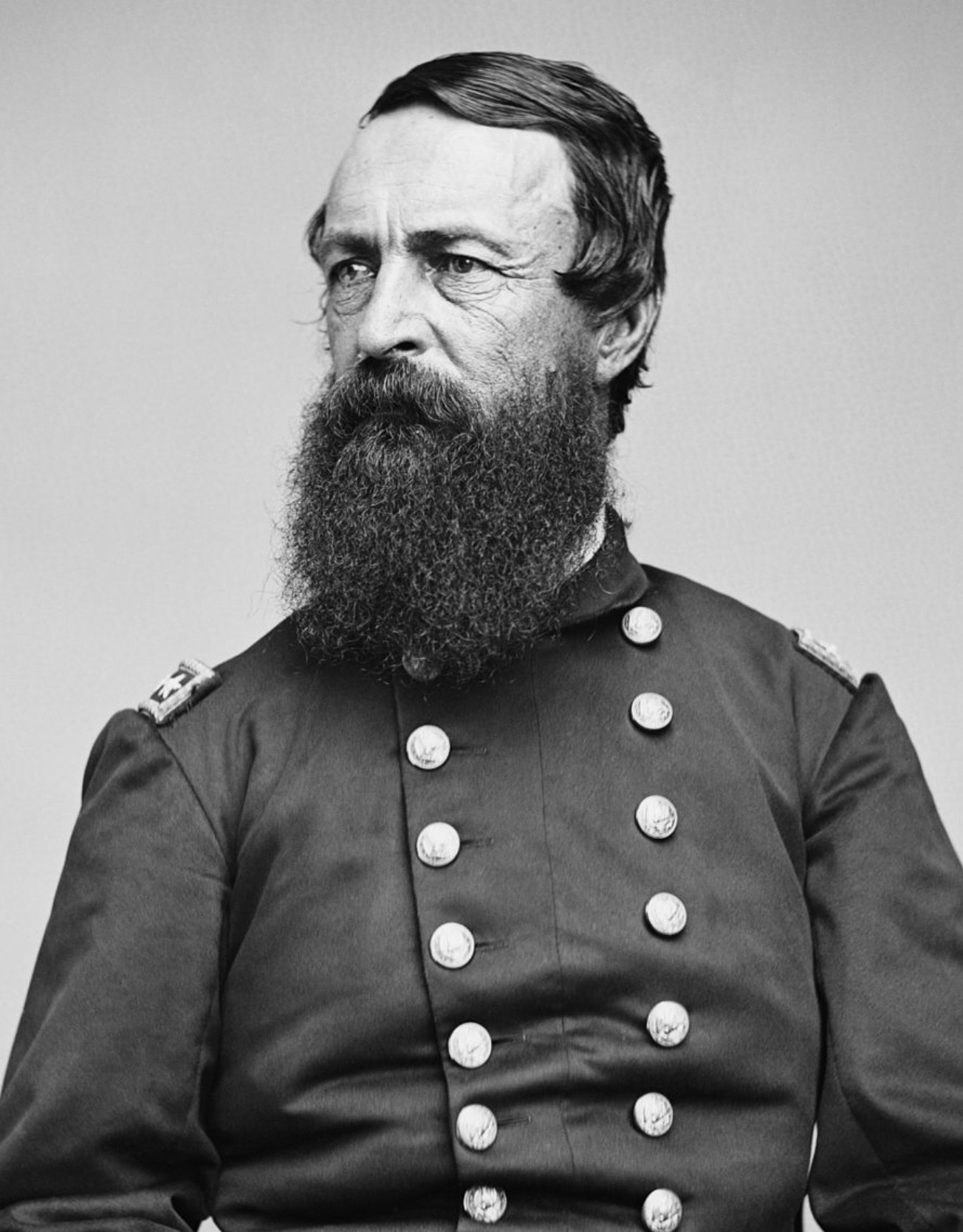
- Porter in the 1860s, during the American Civil War
- Born: June 8, 1813; Chester, Pennsylvania, U.S.
- Died: February 13, 1891 (aged 77); Washington, D.C., U.S.
- Burial place: Arlington National Cemetery, Arlington, Virginia, U.S.
- Relatives: David Porter (father); Fitz John Porter (cousin)
- Military career
- Allegiance: Mexico; United States: Union
- Branch: Mexican Navy; United States Navy: Union Navy
- Service years: 1825–1828 (Mexico); 1829–1891 (US)
- Rank: Midshipman (Mexico); Admiral (US)
- Commands: Superintendent of the U.S. Naval Academy; Board of Inspection
- Conflicts: Mexican–American War; Siege of Veracruz; American Civil War; Battle of Forts Jackson and St. Philip; Battle of Grand Gulf; Vicksburg campaign; Red River campaign; Second Battle of Fort Fisher
- Other work: Incidents and Anecdotes of the Civil War (1885)

David Dixon Porter (June 8, 1813 – February 13, 1891) was a United States Navy admiral and a member of one of the most distinguished families in the history of the U.S. Navy. Promoted as the second U.S. Navy officer ever to attain the rank of admiral, after his adoptive brother David G. Farragut, Porter helped improve the Navy as the Superintendent of the U.S. Naval Academy after significant service in the American Civil War.

Porter began naval service as a midshipman at the age of 10 years under his father, Commodore David Porter, on the frigate USS John Adams. For the remainder of his life, he was associated with the sea. Porter served in the Mexican War in the attack on the fort at the City of Vera Cruz. At the outbreak of the Civil War, he was part of a plan to hold Fort Pickens, near Pensacola, Florida, for the Union; its execution disrupted the effort to relieve the garrison at Fort Sumter, leading to Sumter's fall. Porter commanded an independent flotilla of mortar boats at the capture of New Orleans. Later, he was advanced to the rank of (acting) rear admiral in command of the Mississippi River Squadron, which cooperated with the army under Major General Ulysses S. Grant in the Vicksburg Campaign. After the fall of Vicksburg, he led the naval forces in the difficult Red River Campaign in Louisiana. Late in 1864, Porter was transferred from the interior to the Atlantic coast, where he led the U.S. Navy in the joint assaults on Fort Fisher, the final significant naval action of the war.

Porter worked to raise the standards of the U.S. Navy in the position of Superintendent of the Naval Academy when it was restored to Annapolis. He initiated reforms in the curriculum to increase professionalism. In the early days of President Grant's administration, Porter was de facto Secretary of the Navy. When his adoptive brother David G. Farragut was advanced from rank of vice-admiral to admiral, Porter took his previous position; likewise, when Farragut died, Porter became the second man to hold the newly created rank of admiral. He gathered a corps of like-minded officers devoted to naval reform.

Porter's administration of the Navy Department aroused powerful opposition by some in Congress, who forced the Secretary of the Navy Adolph E. Borie to resign. His replacement, George Robeson, curtailed Porter's power and eased him into semi-retirement in 1875.

== Family ==
David Dixon Porter was born in Chester, Pennsylvania, on June 8, 1813, to David Porter and Evalina (Anderson) Porter. The family had strong naval traditions; the elder Porter's father, also named David, had been captain of a Massachusetts vessel in the American Revolutionary War, as had his uncle Samuel. In the next generation, David Porter and his brother John entered the fledgling United States Navy and served with distinction during the War of 1812. David Porter was named to the rank of commodore.

The younger David was one of 10 children, including six boys. His youngest brother Thomas died of yellow fever at the age of ten, contracted when traveling with his father for the Mexican Navy. The surviving five sons all became officers, four in the U.S. Navy:

- William
- David Dixon, became the second man promoted to rank of admiral.
- Hambleton, died of yellow fever while a passed midshipman.
- Henry Ogden
- Theodoric, became an officer in the US Army; he was killed at Matamoros in the Mexican–American War.

His uncle John Porter and his wife did not have as many children, but their son Fitz John Porter was a major general in the US Army at the time of the Civil War. Another son, Bolton Porter, was lost with his ship USS Levant in 1861. His aunt Anne married their cousin Alexander Porter. Their son David Henry Porter became a captain in the Mexican Navy during its struggle for independence (see below). The naval tradition continued into later generations of the family's descendants.

In addition to rearing their own children, his parents David and Evalina Porter adopted James Glasgow Farragut. The boy's mother died in 1808 when he was seven, and his father George Farragut, a U.S. naval officer in the American Revolution and friend of David Porter Sr., was unable to care for all his children. Commodore David Porter offered to adopt James, to which the boy and George agreed. In 1811, James started serving a midshipman under Porter in the U.S. Navy, and changed his first name to David. He had a distinguished career as David G. Farragut, serving as the first man to attain the new rank of admiral, instituted by the U.S. Congress after the American Civil War.

== Time of training ==
=== In the Mexican Navy ===
After a reprimand for an 1824 incident, Commodore David Porter decided to resign from the navy rather than submit. He accepted an offer from the government of Mexico to become their General of Marine – in effect, the commander of their navy. He took with him a nephew, David Henry Porter, and his sons, David Dixon and Thomas. The two boys were made midshipmen. Thomas died of yellow fever soon after arriving in Mexico; he was 10. David Dixon, age 12, was not affected by the disease. He was able to serve on the frigate Libertad, where he saw little action, and on the captured merchantman Esmeralda for a raid on Spanish shipping in Cuban waters.

In 1828, David Dixon accompanied his cousin, David Henry Porter, captain of the brig Guerrero, in another raid. Guerrero, mounting 22 guns, was one of the finest vessels in the small Mexican Navy. Off the coast of Cuba on February 10, 1828, she encountered a flotilla of about fifty schooners, convoyed by Spanish brigs Marte and Amalia. Captain Porter elected to attack, and soon forced the flotilla to seek refuge in the harbor at Mariel, 30 miles (48 km) west of Havana. The Spanish 64-gun frigate Lealtad put to sea. Guerrero was able to break off the action and escape, but overnight Captain Porter decided to circle back and attack the vessels at Mariel. Intercepted by Lealtad, he could not escape. In the battle, Captain Porter was killed, together with many of his crew; the young midshipman Porter was slightly wounded. He was among the survivors who surrendered and were imprisoned in Havana until they could be exchanged. Commodore Porter chose not to risk his son again, and sent him back to the United States by way of New Orleans.

== Peacetime navy ==
David Dixon Porter obtained an official appointment as midshipman in the U.S. Navy through his grandfather, US Congressman William Anderson. The appointment was dated February 2, 1829, when he was sixteen years of age; this was somewhat older than many midshipmen, some of whom had been taken in as boys. Due to his relative maturity and experience, greater than that of most naval lieutenants, Porter tended to be cocky and challenge some of his superiors, leading to conflict. Except for intervention by Commodore James Biddle, who acted favorably because Porter's father was a hero, his warrant as a midshipman would not have been renewed.

Porter's last duty as a midshipman was on the frigate USS United States, flagship of Commodore Daniel Patterson, from June 1832 until October 1834. Patterson's family accompanied him, including his daughter, George Ann ("Georgy"). The two young people renewed their acquaintance and became engaged. After Porter returned home, he completed the examination for passed midshipman, and soon after was assigned to duty in the Coast Survey. There, his pay was such that he could save enough to marry.

== Marriage and family ==
Porter and Georgy Patterson were married on March 10, 1839. Of their four sons, three had military careers, and their two surviving daughters married men who had military service or were active officers.

- Major David Essex Porter served in the army during the Civil War, but resigned after two years in the peacetime army.
- Captain Theodoric Porter made his career in the navy.
- Lieutenant Colonel Carlile Patterson Porter was an officer in the U.S. Marine Corps; his son, David Dixon Porter II, also served in the Marines, rising to the rank of major general and earning the Medal of Honor.
- One of their two surviving daughters, Elizabeth, married Leavitt Curtis Logan, who achieved the rank of Rear Admiral.
- Their other surviving daughter, Elena, married Charles H. Campbell, a former army officer who had left the service before their marriage.
- Richard Bache Porter was the only child to have no relation to the military services.

== Advance to officer ==
In March 1841, Porter was promoted in rank to lieutenant, and in April of the next year he was detached from the Coast Survey. He had a brief tour of duty in the Mediterranean, and then he was assigned to the U.S. Navy's Hydrographic Office.

=== Mission to Santo Domingo ===
In 1846, the era of peace was coming to a close. The United States had annexed the Republic of Texas, and the islands of the Caribbean seemed to be likely targets for further expansion. The Republic of Santo Domingo (the present-day Dominican Republic) had broken off from the Republic of Haiti in 1844, and the United States State Department needed to determine the new nation's social, political, and economic stability. The suitability of the Bay of Samana for U.S. Navy operations was also of interest. To find out, Secretary of State James Buchanan asked Porter to undertake a private investigation. He accepted the assignment, and on March 15, 1846, he left home. He arrived in Santo Domingo after some unexpected delays and spent two weeks mapping the coastline. On May 19, he began a trek through the interior that left him without communication for a month. On June 19, he emerged from the jungle, bitten by insects, but with the information that the State Department wanted. He then discovered that while he was away the United States had gone to war with Mexico.

== In command of ships ==
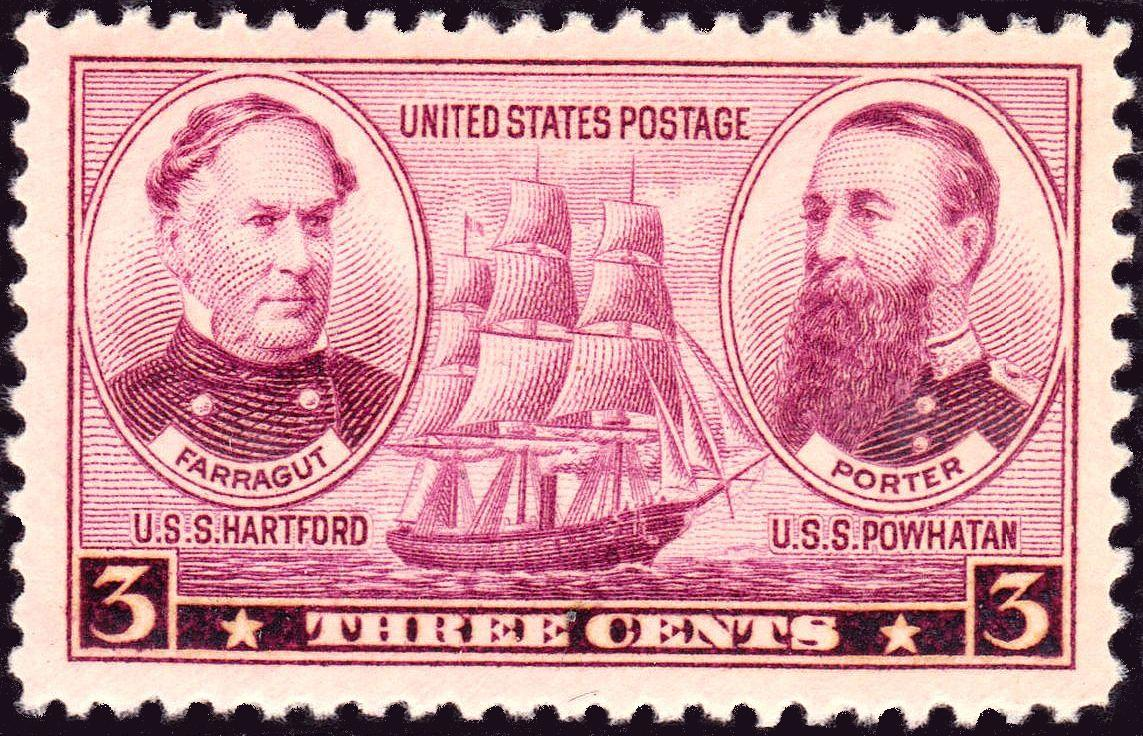
~ David Farragut ~ David Dixon Porter ~ Issue of 1937

=== Mexican War ===
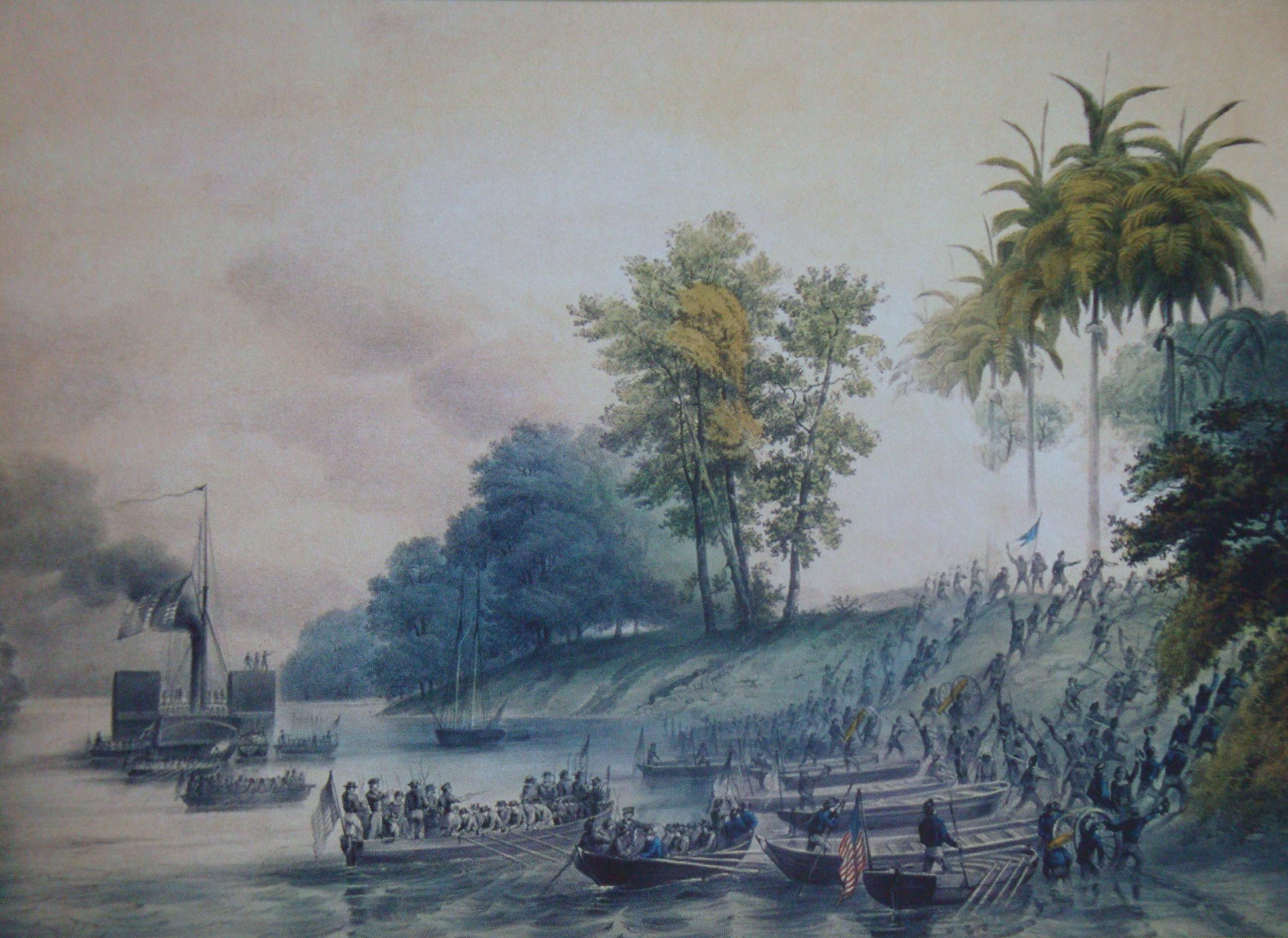
Perry and Porter attacked and took San Juan Bautista (now Villahermosa) in the Second Battle of Tabasco.

Mexico did not have a real navy, so naval personnel had little opportunity for distinction. Porter served as first lieutenant of the sidewheel gunboat USS Spitfire under Commander Josiah Tattnall III. Spitfire was at Vera Cruz when General Winfield Scott led the amphibious assault on the city, which was shielded by a series of forts and the ancient Castle of San Juan de Ulloa. Porter had spent many hours exploring the castle when he had been a midshipman in the Mexican Navy, so he was familiar with both its strengths and its weaknesses. He submitted a plan to attack it to Captain Tattnall. Taking eight oarsmen and the ship's gig, he sounded out a channel on the night of March 22–23, 1847, using the experience he had gained with the Coast Survey. The next morning, Spitfire and other vessels taking part in the bombardment followed the channel that Porter had laid out and took up positions inside the harbor, where they were able to pound the forts and castle. Doing so meant, however, that they had to run by the forts, which was contrary to the orders of Commodore Matthew C. Perry. Perry sent signals ordering the vessels to break off the bombardment and return, but Tattnall ordered his men not to look at the commodore's signals. Not until a special messenger came with explicit orders to retire did Maffitt cease firing. Perry appreciated the audacity shown by his subordinates, but did not approve of the way they had disregarded his orders. Henceforth, he kept Spitfire by his side.

On June 13, 1847, Perry mounted an expedition to capture the interior town of Tabasco. Porter on his own led a charge of 68 sailors to capture the fort defending the city. Perry rewarded him for his initiative by making him captain of Spitfire. It was his first command. It brought him no advantages, however, as the naval part of the war was essentially over.

=== Civilian service ===
In Washington again following the war, Porter saw little chance for professional improvement and none for advancement. In order to gain experience in handling steamships, he took leave of absence from the Navy to command civilian ships. He insisted that his crews submit to the methods of military discipline; his employers were noncommittal about his methods, but they were impressed by the results. They asked him to stay in Australia, but his health and the health of his eldest daughter Georgianne persuaded him to return. Back in the United States, he moved his family from Washington to New York in the hope that the climate would benefit his daughter, but she died shortly after the move. His second daughter, Evalina ("Nina"), also died in the interwar period.

Once again on active duty, he commanded the storeship USS Supply in a venture to bring camels to the United States. The project was promoted by Secretary of War Jefferson Davis, who thought that the desert animals could be useful for the cavalry in the arid Southwest. Supply made two successful trips before Secretary Davis left office and the experiment was discontinued.

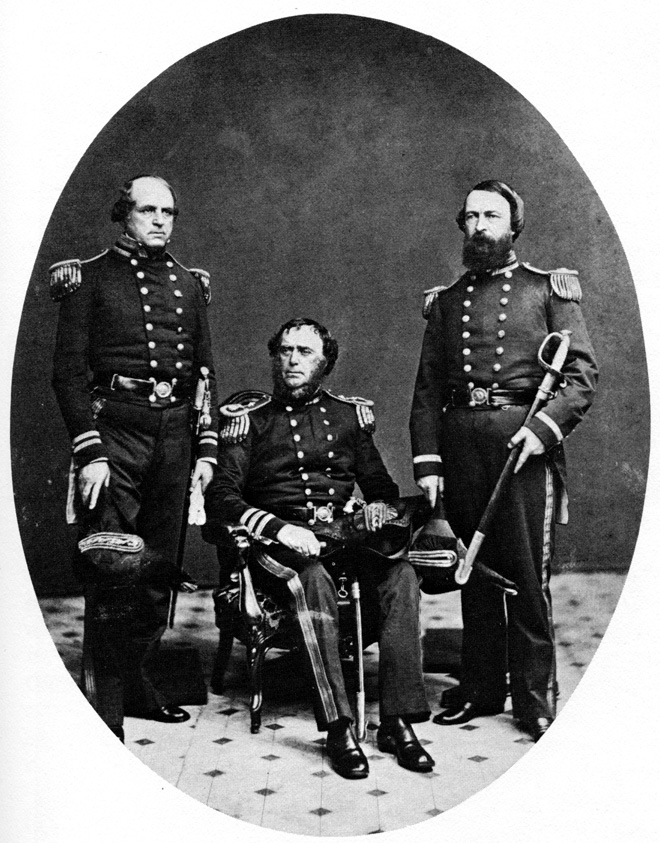
Porter, on the right, in 1860. The other officers are Sidney Smith Lee and Samuel F. Du Pont.

In 1859, he received an attractive offer from the Pacific Mail Steamship Company to be captain of a ship then under construction. The offer would be effective when she was complete. He would have accepted, but he was delayed in his departure. Before he could leave, war had broken out again.

== Civil War ==
=== Powhatan and the relief of Fort Pickens ===
The seceded states laid claim to the national forts within their boundaries, but they did not make good their claim to Fort Sumter in South Carolina and Forts Pickens, Zachary Taylor, and Jefferson in Florida. They soon made it clear that they would use force if necessary to gain possession of Fort Sumter and Fort Pickens. President Abraham Lincoln resolved not to cede them without a fight. Secretary of State William H. Seward, Captain Montgomery C. Meigs of the US Army, and Porter devised a plan for the relief of Fort Pickens. The principal element of their plan required use of the steam frigate USS Powhatan, which would be commanded by Porter and would carry reinforcements to the fort from New York. Because no one was above suspicion in those days, the plan had to be implemented in complete secrecy; not even Secretary of the Navy Gideon Welles was to be advised.

Welles was in the meantime preparing an expedition for the relief of the garrison at Fort Sumter. As he was unaware that Powhatan would not be available, he included it in his plans. When the other vessels assigned to the effort showed up, the South Carolina troops at Charleston began to bombard Fort Sumter, and the Civil War was on. The relief expedition could only wait outside the harbor. The expedition had little chance to be successful in any case; without the support of the guns on Powhatan, it was completely impotent. The only contribution made by the expedition was to carry the soldiers who had defended Fort Sumter back to the North following their surrender and parole.

Lincoln did not punish Seward for his part in the incident, so Welles felt that he had no choice but to forgive Porter, whose culpability was less. Later, he reasoned that it had at least a redeeming feature in that Porter, whose loyalty had been suspect, was henceforth firmly attached to the Union. As he wrote,

In detaching the Powhatan from the Sumter expedition and giving the command to Porter, Mr. Seward extricated that officer from Secession influences, and committed him at once, and decisively, to the Union cause.

=== Mortar fleet at New Orleans and Vicksburg ===
In late 1861, the Navy Department began to develop plans to open the Mississippi River. The first move would be to capture New Orleans. For this Porter, by this time advanced to rank of commander, was given the responsibility of organizing a flotilla of some twenty mortar boats that would participate in the reduction of the forts defending the city from the south. The flotilla was a semi-autonomous part of the West Gulf Blockading Squadron, which was to be commanded by Porter's adoptive brother Captain David G. Farragut.

The bombardment of Fort Jackson and Fort St. Philip began on April 18, 1862. Porter had opined that two days of concentrated fire would be enough to reduce the forts, but after five days they seemed as strong as ever. The mortars were beginning to run low on ammunition. Farragut, who put little reliance on the mortars anyway, made the decision to bypass the forts on the night of April 24. The fleet successfully ran past the forts; the mortars were left behind, but they bombarded the forts during the passage in order to distract the enemy gunners. Once the fleet was above the forts, nothing significant stood between them and New Orleans; Farragut demanded the surrender of the city, and it fell to his fleet on April 29. The forts were still between him and Porter's mortar fleet, but when the latter again began to pummel Fort Jackson, its garrison mutinied and forced its surrender. Fort St. Philip had to follow suit. Surrender of the two forts was accepted by Commander Porter on April 28.

Following orders from the Navy Department, Farragut took his fleet upstream to capture other strongpoints on the river, with the aim of complete possession of the Mississippi. At Vicksburg, Mississippi he found that the bluffs were too high to be reached by the guns of his fleet, so he ordered Porter to bring his mortar flotilla up. The mortars suppressed the Rebel artillery well enough that Farragut's ships could pass the batteries at Vicksburg and link up with a Union flotilla coming down from the north. The city could not be taken, however, without active participation by the army, which did not happen. On July 8, the bombardment ceased when Porter was ordered to Hampton Roads to assist in Major General George B. McClellan's Peninsula Campaign. A few days later, Farragut followed, and the first attempt to take Vicksburg was over.

=== Acting rear admiral: the Vicksburg Campaign ===
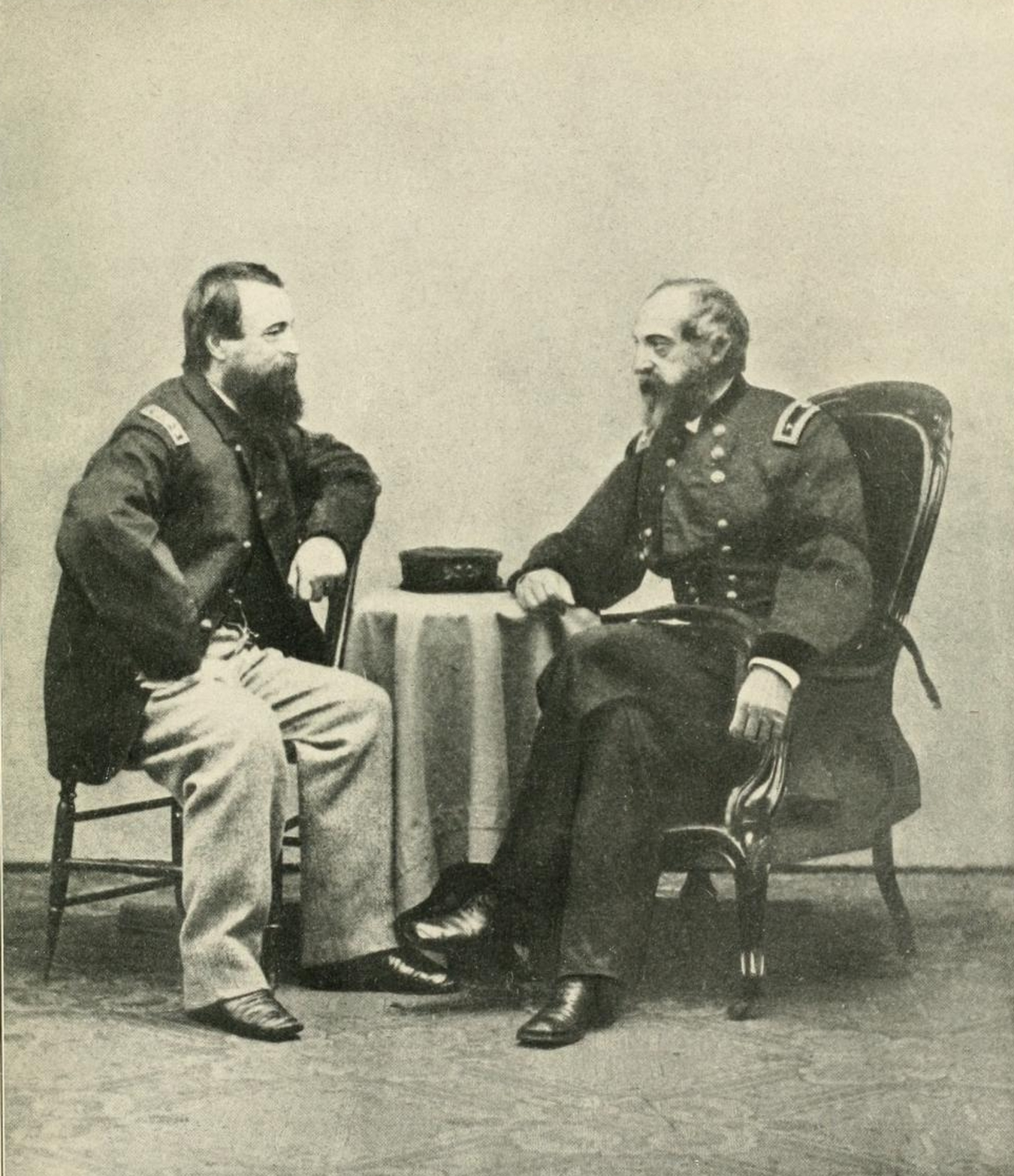
Porter and George Gordon Meade

In the summer of 1862, shortly after Porter left Vicksburg, the U.S. Navy was extensively modified; among the features of the revised organization were a set of officer ranks from ensign to rear admiral that paralleled the ranks in the Army. Among the new ranks created were those of commodore and rear admiral. According to the organization charts, the persons in command of the blockading squadrons were to be rear admirals. Another part of the reorganization transferred the Western gunboat flotilla from the army to the navy, and retitled it the Mississippi River Squadron. The change of title implied that it was formally equivalent to the other squadrons, so its commanding officer would likewise be a rear admiral. The problem was that the commandant of the gunboat flotilla, Flag Officer Charles H. Davis, had not shown the initiative that the Navy Department wanted, so he had to be removed. He was made rear admiral, but he was recalled to Washington to serve as chief of the Bureau of Navigation.

Most of the men who could have replaced Davis were either less suitable or were unavailable because of other assignments, so finally Secretary Welles decided to appoint Porter to the position. He did this despite some doubt. As he wrote in his Diary,

Relieved Davis and appointed D. D. Porter to the Western Flotilla, which is hereafter to be recognized as a squadron. Porter is but a Commander. He has, however, stirring and positive qualities, is fertile in resources, has great energy, excessive and sometimes not over-scrupulous ambition, is impressed with and boastful of his own powers, given to exaggeration in relation to himself, —a Porter infirmity, —is not generous to older and superior living officers, whom he is too ready to traduce, but is kind and patronizing to favorites who are juniors, and generally to official inferiors. Is given to cliquism but is brave and daring like all his family... It is a question, with his mixture of good and bad traits, how he will succeed.

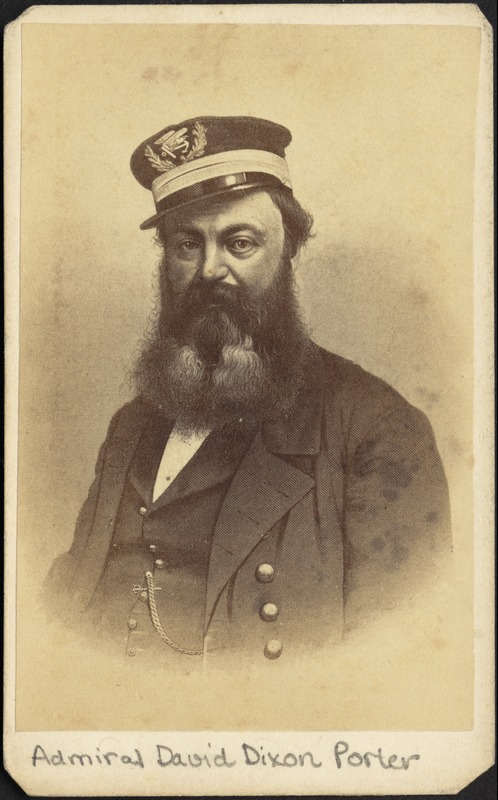
Admiral David Dixon Porter, ca. 1859–1870; from the Carte de Visite Collection of the Boston Public Library

Thus Commander Porter became Acting Rear Admiral Porter without going through the intermediate ranks of captain and commodore. (He was one of only three US Navy admirals to have been promoted to rear admiral without having first served in the rank of captain. The others being Richard E. Byrd and Ben Moreell.) He was assigned to command the Mississippi Squadron and left Washington for his new command on October 9, 1862, and arrived in Cairo, Illinois, on October 15.

Secretary of War Edwin Stanton considered Porter "a gas bag ... blowing his own trumpet and stealing credit which belongs to others." Historian John D. Winters, in his The Civil War in Louisiana, describes Porter as having "possessed the qualities of abundant energy, recklessness, resourcefulness, and fighting spirit needed for the trying role ahead. Porter was assigned the task of aiding General John A. McClernand in opening the upper Mississippi. The choice of McClernand, a volunteer political general, pleased Porter because he felt that all West Point men were 'too self-sufficient, pedantic, and unpractical.'"

Winters also writes that Porter "revealed a weakness he was to display many times: he belittled a superior officer [Charles H. Poor]. He often heaped undue praise upon a subordinate, but rarely could find much to admire in a superior."

The Army was showing renewed interest in opening the Mississippi River at just this time, and Porter met two men who would have great influence on the campaign. First was Major General William T. Sherman, a man of similar temperament to his own, with whom he immediately formed a particularly strong friendship. The other was Major General McClernand, whom he just as quickly came to dislike. Later they would be joined by Major General Ulysses S. Grant; Grant and Porter became friends and worked together quite well, but it was on a more strictly professional level than his relation with Sherman.

Close cooperation between the Army and Navy was vital to the success of the siege of Vicksburg. The most prominent contribution to the campaign was the passage of the batteries at Vicksburg and Grand Gulf by a major part of the Mississippi River Squadron. Grant had asked merely for a few gunboats to shield his troops, but Porter persuaded him to use more than half of his fleet. After nightfall on April 16, 1863, the fleet moved downstream past the batteries. Only one vessel was lost in the ensuing firefight. Six nights later, a similar run past the batteries gave Grant the transports he needed for crossing the river. Now south of Vicksburg, Grant at first tried to attack the Rebels through Grand Gulf, and requested Porter to eliminate the batteries there before his troops would be sent across. On April 29, the gunboats spent most of the day bombarding two Confederate forts. They succeeded in silencing the lower of the two, but the upper fort remained. Grant called off the assault and moved downstream to Bruinsburg, where he was able to cross the river unopposed.

Although the fleet made no major offensive contributions to the campaign after Grand Gulf, it remained important in its secondary role of keeping the blockade against the city. When Vicksburg was besieged, the encirclement was made complete by the Navy's control of the Mississippi and Yazoo Rivers. When it finally fell on July 4 (1863), Grant was unstinting in his praise of the assistance he had received from Porter and his men.

For his contribution to the victory, Porter's appointment as "acting" rear admiral was made permanent, dated from July 4.

=== Red River Expedition ===
After the opening of the Mississippi, the political general Nathaniel P. Banks, who was in charge of army forces in Louisiana, brought pressure on the Lincoln administration to mount a campaign across Louisiana and into Texas along the line of the Red River. The ostensible purpose was to extend Union control into Texas, but Banks was influenced by numerous speculators to convert the campaign into little more than a raid to seize cotton. Admiral Porter was not in favor; he thought that the next objective of his fleet should be to capture Mobile, but he received direct orders from Washington to cooperate with Banks.

After considerable delays caused by Banks's attention to political rather than military matters, the Red River expedition got under way in early March 1864. From the start, navigation of the river presented as great a problem for Porter and his fleet as did the Confederate army that opposed them. The army under Banks and the navy under Porter did little to cooperate, and instead often became rivals in a race to seize cotton. Confederate opposition under Major General Richard Taylor (Note: A son of former U.S. President Zachary Taylor.) succeeded in keeping them apart by defeating Banks at the Battle of Mansfield, following which Banks gave up the expedition. From that time on, Porter's primary task was to extricate his fleet. The task was made difficult by falling water levels in the river, but he ultimately got most out, with the help of heroic efforts by some of the soldiers who stayed to protect the fleet.

=== Capture of Fort Fisher ===
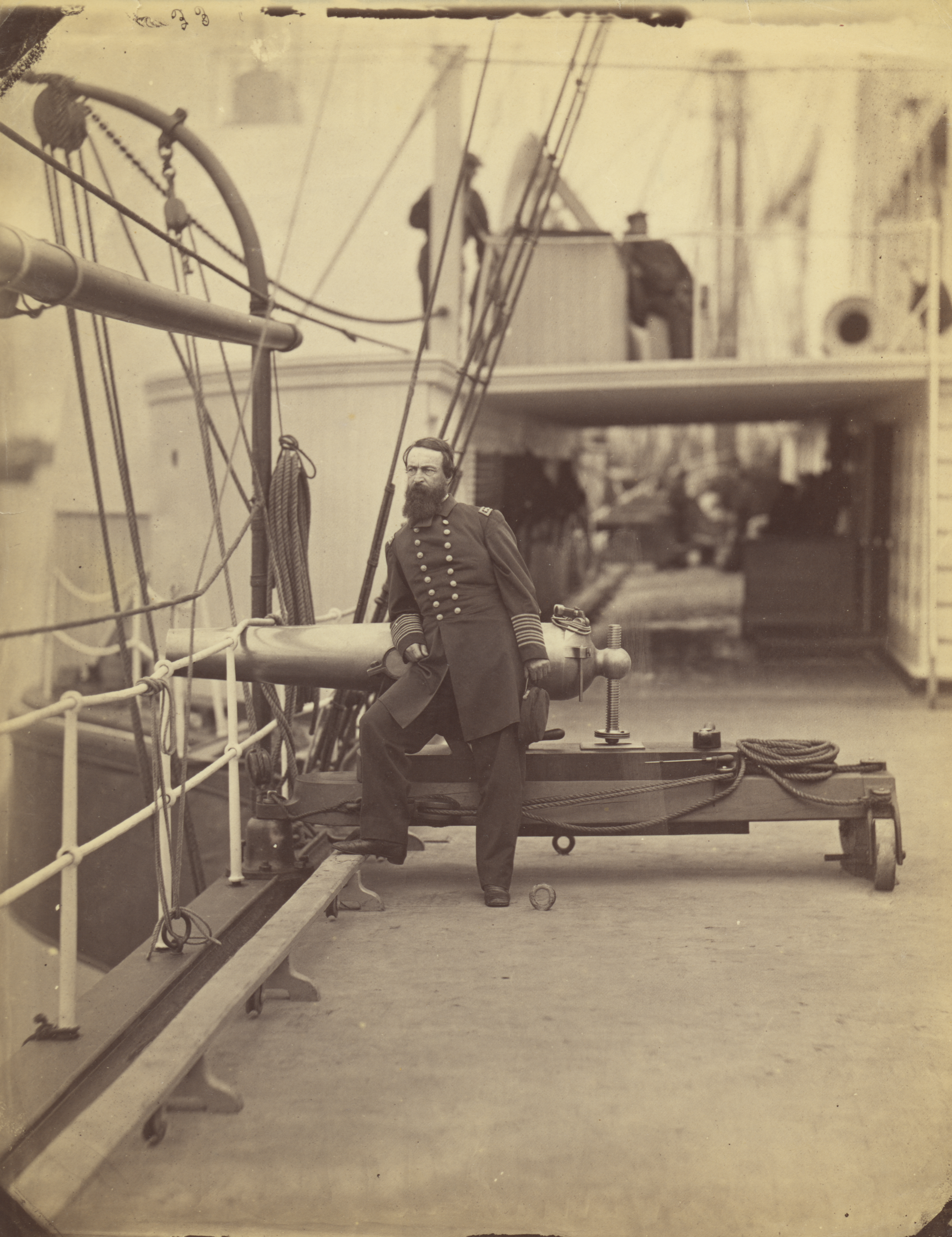
Porter aboard the USS Malvern after the Second Battle of Fort Fisher.

By late summer 1864, Wilmington, North Carolina, was the only Atlantic port open for running the Union blockade, and the Navy Department began to plan to close it. Its major defense was Fort Fisher, a massive structure at the New Inlet to the Cape Fear River. Secretary Welles believed that the head of the North Atlantic Blockading Squadron, Rear Admiral Samuel Phillips Lee, was inadequate for the task, so he at first assigned Rear Admiral Farragut to be Lee's replacement. Farragut was too ill to serve, however, so Welles decided to switch Lee with Porter: Lee would command the Mississippi River Squadron, and Porter would come east and prepare for the attack on Fort Fisher.

The planned attack on Fort Fisher required the cooperation of the army, and the troops were taken from the Army of the James. It was expected that Brigadier General Godfrey Weitzel would command, but Major General Benjamin F. Butler, the commander of the Army of the James, exercised one of the prerogatives of his position to take over as leader of the expedition. Butler proposed that the fort could be flattened by exploding a ship filled with gunpowder near it, and Porter accepted the idea; if successful, the scheme would avoid a protracted siege or its alternative, a frontal assault. Accordingly, the old steamer USS Louisiana was packed with powder and blown up in the early morning of December 24, 1864. This had, however, no discernible effect on the fort. Butler brought part of his troops ashore, but he was already convinced that the effort was hopeless, so he removed his force before making an all-out assault.

Porter, enraged by Butler's timorousness, went to U. S. Grant and demanded that Butler be removed. Grant agreed, and placed Major General Alfred H. Terry in charge of a second assault on the fort. The second assault began on January 13, 1865, with unopposed landings and bombardment of the fort by the fleet. Porter imposed new methods of bombardment this time: each ship was assigned a specific target, with intent to destroy the enemy's guns rather than to knock down the walls. They were also to continue firing after the men ashore started their assault; the ships would shift their aim to points ahead of the advancing troops. The bombardment continued for two more days, while Terry got his men into position. On the 15th, frontal assaults on opposite faces by Terry's soldiers on the land side and 2000 sailors and marines on the beach vanquished the fort. This was the last significant naval operation of the war.

=== Tour of Richmond ===
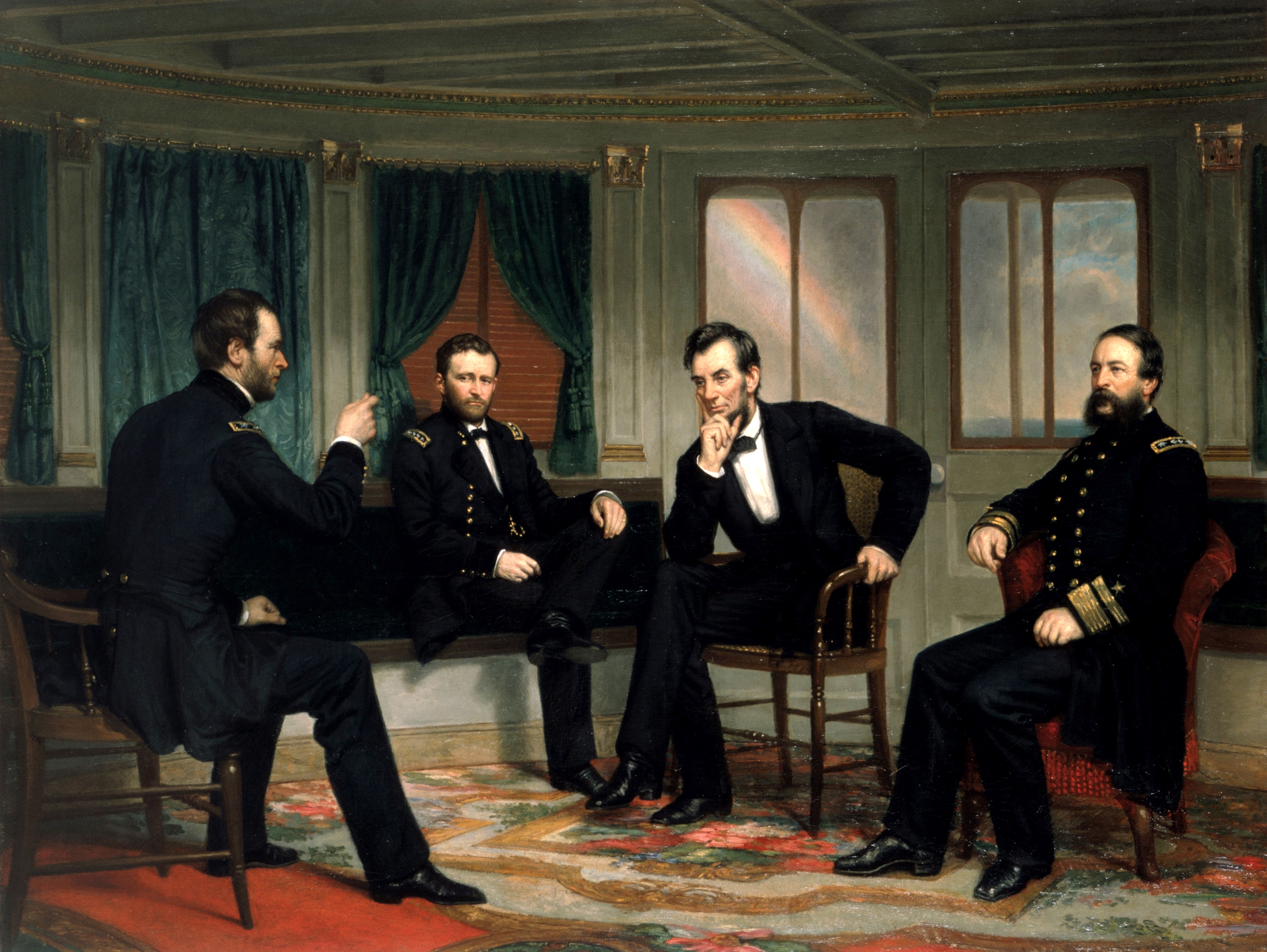
The Peacemakers 1868 Painting, featuring, from left to right: Maj. Gen. William T. Sherman, LTG Ulysses S. Grant, President Abraham Lincoln, and Rear Admiral David Dixon Porter aboard the River Queen in March 1865. Around a month before Porter's Tour of Richmond

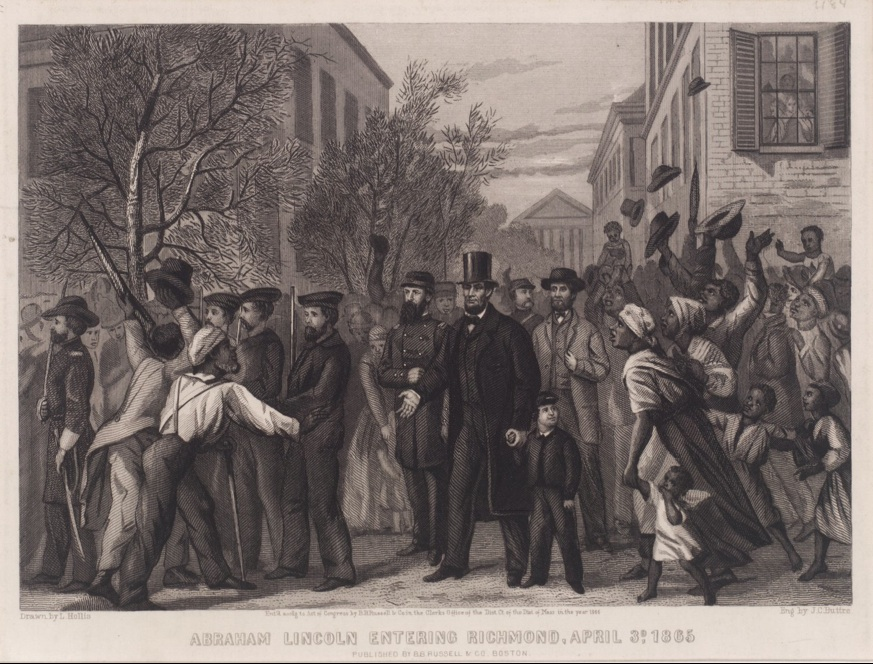
An engraving showing U.S. President Abraham Lincoln on foot touring the city of Richmond with Porter in April 1865

By April 1865, the Civil War drawing to a close, U.S. victory in the war was all but guaranteed. After the Confederate capital of Richmond was captured by U.S. forces, Porter toured the city on foot, accompanying U.S. President Abraham Lincoln with several armed bodyguards. He fondly recalled the events in his 1885 book, Incidents and Anecdotes of the Civil War, where he described witnessing scores of many freed slaves rushing to get a glimpse of Lincoln. They admired the president as a hero and credited him for their emancipation; they were kissing his clothing and singing odes to him:

Twenty years have passed since that event; it is almost too new in history to make a great impression, but the time will come when it will loom up as one of the greatest of man's achievements, and the name of Abraham Lincoln — who of his own will struck the shackles from the limbs of four millions of people — will be honored thousands of years from now as man's name was never honored before. [...] The scene was so touching I hated to disturb it, yet we could not stay there all day; we had to move on; so I requested the patriarch to withdraw from about the President with his companions and let us pass on.

— David Dixon Porter, Incidents and Anecdotes of the Civil War (1885), pp. 295–296.

=== Assassination of Abraham Lincoln ===
A few weeks after his visit to Virginia, Lincoln was assassinated. Porter was greatly upset by the news, as he admired Lincoln greatly. Porter said Lincoln was the best man he ever knew and ever would know. He stated that he felt some responsibility for Lincoln's death, feeling that had he been with him that night, he might have prevented his murder.

== Postwar ==
=== U.S. Naval Academy ===
The U.S. Navy was rapidly downsized at the end of the war, and Porter, like most of his contemporaries, had fewer ships to command and no clear purpose. Some feared that at sea he might provoke a foreign war, particularly with Great Britain, because of what he saw as their support for the Confederacy. To make use of his undeniable talents, Secretary Welles appointed him Superintendent of the Naval Academy in 1865. The academy, despite having been established to train naval personnel, was neglected and underfunded by Congress, with a reputation for producing cadets who were poorly educated on their duties, prone to misbehavior, and lacking the professionalism expected in the Navy.

Porter resolved to change that; he determined to make the academy the rival of the Military Academy at West Point. The curriculum was revised to reflect the reality of naval life, organized sports were encouraged, discipline was enforced, and even social graces were taught. An honor system was installed, "to send honorable men from this institution into the Navy." To be sure that his reforms would remain in place after his departure, he brought to the faculty a group of like-minded men, mostly young officers who had distinguished themselves in the war.

=== Presidency of Ulysses S. Grant ===
When Porter's friend Ulysses S. Grant became president in 1869, he appointed Philadelphia businessman Adolph E. Borie as Secretary of the Navy. Borie had no knowledge of the navy and little desire to learn, so he leaned on Porter for advice that the latter was quite willing to give. In a short time, Borie came to defer to him even on routine matters. Porter used his influence with the secretary to push through several policies to shape the navy as he wanted it; in the process, he made a new set of enemies who either were harmed by his actions or resented his blunt methods. Borie was strongly criticized for his failure to control his subordinate, and after three months he resigned. The new secretary, George Robeson, promptly curtailed Porter's powers.

=== Final years ===
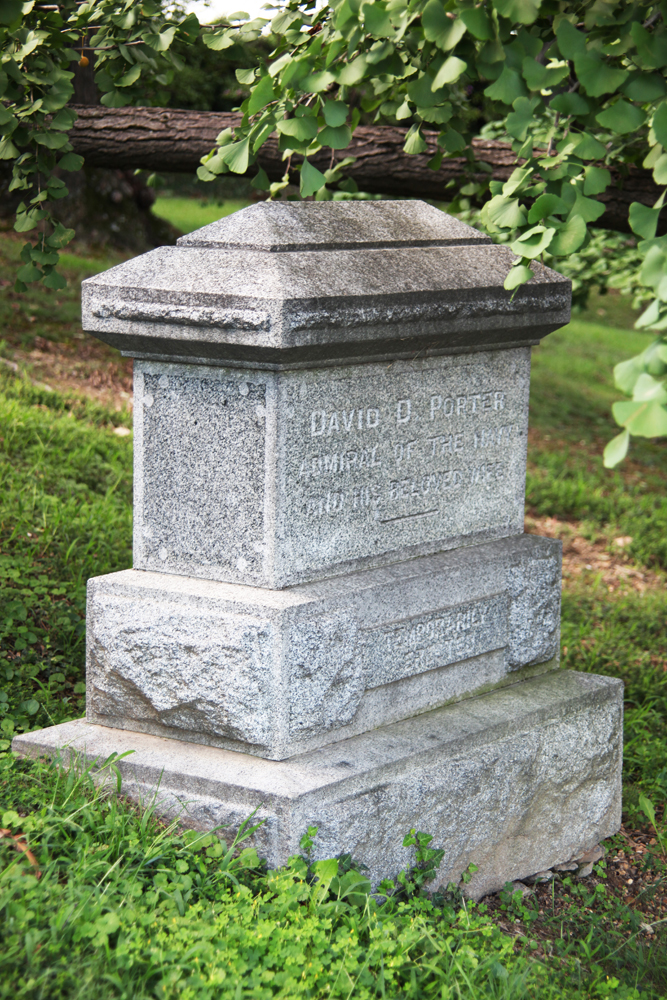
Porter's grave at Arlington National Cemetery

In 1866, the rank of admiral was created in the U.S. Navy. Naval hero David G. Farragut, Porter's adoptive brother, was selected as the nation's first admiral, and Porter became vice admiral at the same time. In 1870, Farragut died, and it was expected that Porter would be promoted to fill the vacancy.

Eventually, he did become the second admiral, but it was after much controversy that was provoked by his many enemies. Among them were several very powerful politicians, including some of the political generals he had contended with in the war. Porter reached the mandatory retirement age of 62 in June 1875 but was allowed to remain on active duty.

Despite the prestige of the high rank, Porter's eclipse in influence continued. For the last twenty years of his life, he had little to do with the operations of the Navy. Porter turned to writing, producing some naval histories.

On October 4, 1866, Porter was elected a Companion of the Pennsylvania Commandery of the Military Order of the Loyal Legion of the United States, a military society of officers who had served in the Union Armed Force during the Civil War, and was assigned insignia number 29. Porter resigned from the Loyal Legion and returned his insignia on January 4, 1880.

In 1890 he became the founding president of the District of Columbia Society of the Sons of the American Revolution. He was assigned national membership number 1801 and District of Columbia Society membership number 1. He served as president of the society until his death the next year. He was also an honorary member of the Society of the Cincinnati.

After twenty years of semi-retirement, his health had begun to give way. In the summer of 1890, he suffered a heart attack; he survived but his health was clearly in decline. He died at the age of 77 on the morning of February 13, 1891. He had served on active duty in the United States Navy for 62 years, having one of the longest careers in its history.

Admiral Porter is interred at Arlington National Cemetery.

== Dates of rank ==
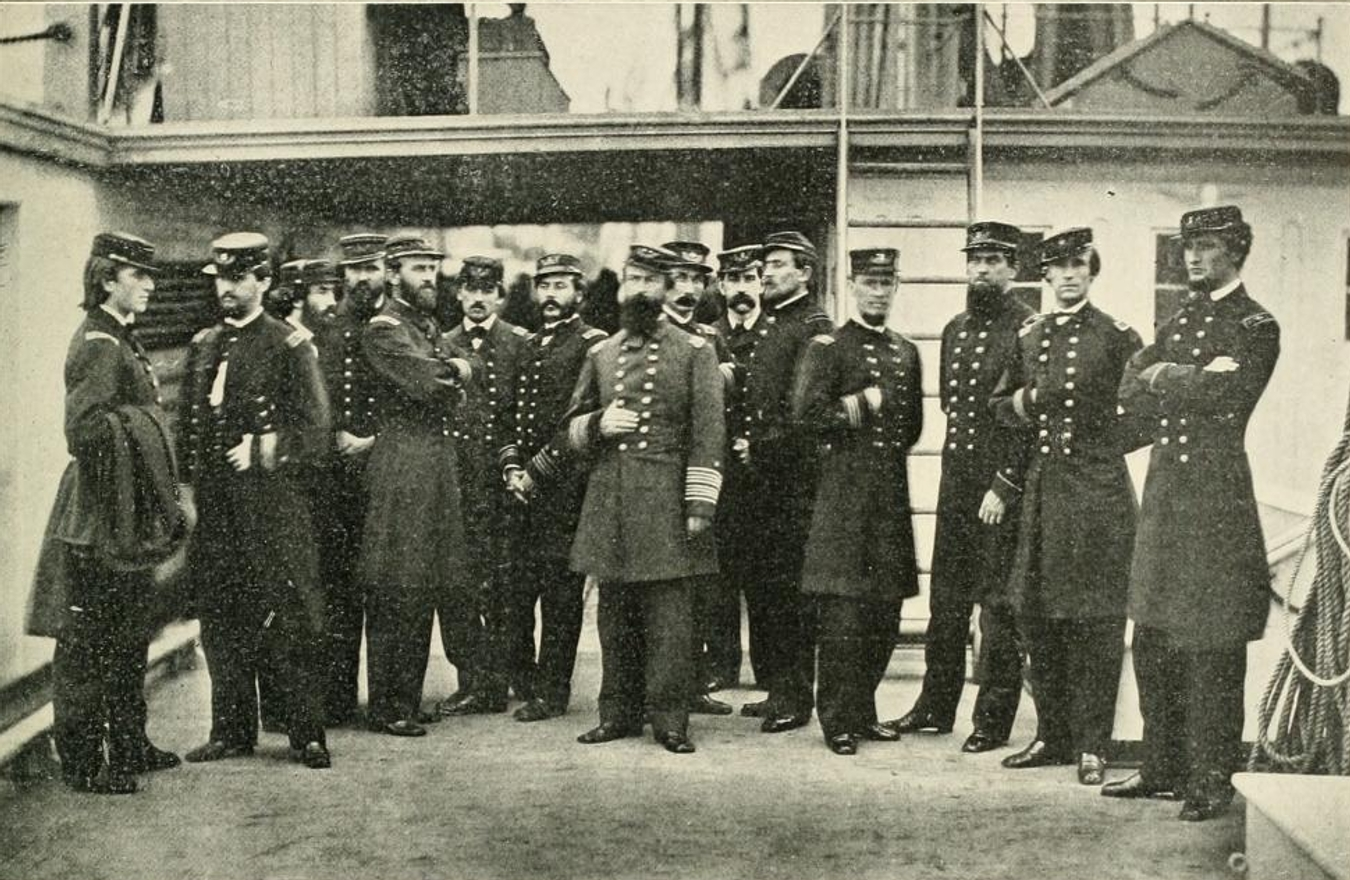
Porter and staff, December 1864

- Midshipman – February 2, 1829
- Passed midshipman – July 3, 1835
- Lieutenant – February 27, 1841
- Commander – April 22, 1861
- Acting rear admiral – circa late 1862
- Rear admiral – July 4, 1863
- Vice admiral – July 25, 1866
- Admiral – August 15, 1870

== Books ==
- Memoir of Commodore David Porter, of the United States Navy Albany, NY: J. Munsell (1875).
- The Adventures of Harry Marline New York: D. Appleton (1885).
- Allan Dare and Robert le Diable. New York: D. Appleton (1885).
- Arthur Merton, a Romance. New York: D. Appleton (1889)
- Incidents and Anecdotes of the Civil War (1885)
- Porter, David Dixon (1886). The Naval History of the Civil War. New York, The Sherman Pub. Company.
- High Old Salts: Stories Intended for the Marines (co-author F. Coburn Adams). Washington: s.n. (1876).
- The Pictorial Battles of the Civil War (La Bree, Ben, editor). New York: Sherman (1885).

== Legacy ==
- Five U.S. ships have been named USS Porter for his father and him.
- Porter Road at the Naval Academy, also known as Officer's Row, was named in his honor.
- A memorial to Porter was installed at Vicksburg National Military Park.
- A public school in Little Neck, Queens N.Y. was named after Porter, PS 94.
- A portrait of Porter is on the cover of Nitty Gritty Dirt Band's seventh studio album, Will the Circle be Unbroken.
- In 1937 the U.S. Post Office issued five commemorative stamps honoring the US Navy and notable naval heroes. David Porter and David Farragut appeared on the 3-cent issue.

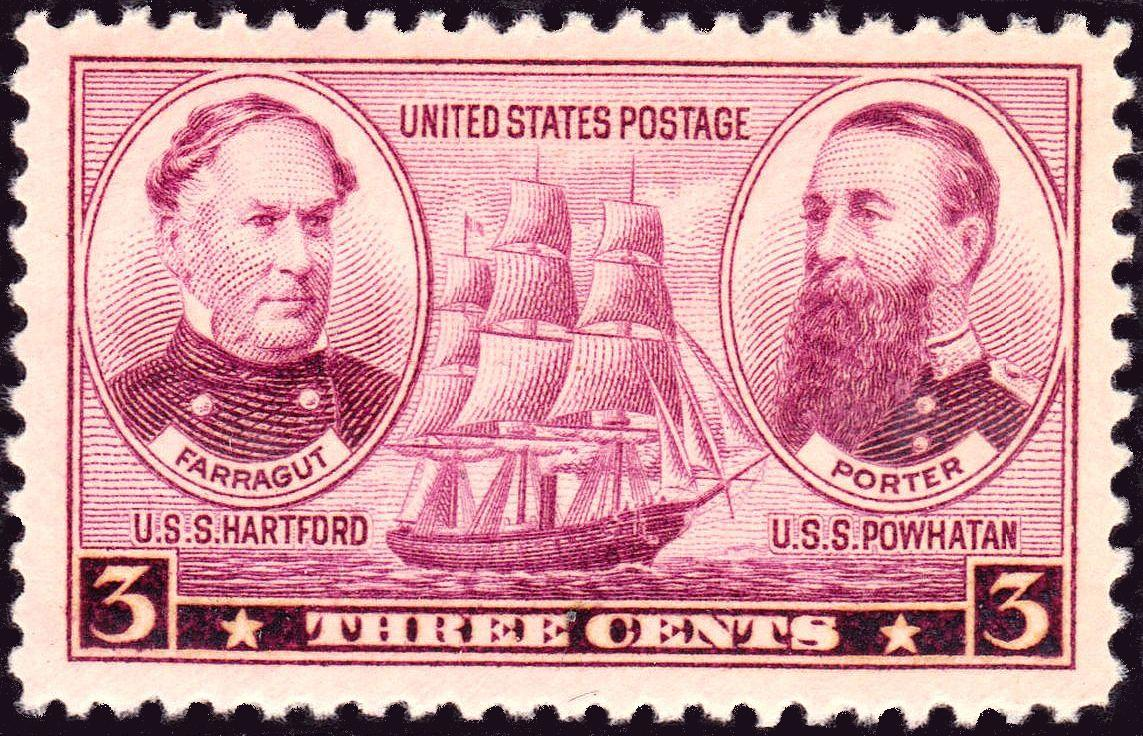
Farragut -- Porter issued February 18, 1937

== See also ==
- Bibliography of Naval history of the American Civil War
- Seth Ledyard Phelps (Naval commander who also served in naval operations in the Western Rivers Fleet)
- List of superintendents of the United States Naval Academy
- Joseph Smith Harris, for an account of the naval bombardment of the forts south of New Orleans

== Bibliography ==
- Duffy, James P., Lincoln's Admiral: the Civil War Campaigns of David Farragut. Wiley, 1997. pp. 276 ISBN 0-471-04208-0
- Fonvielle, Chris E. Jr., The Wilmington Campaign: Last Rays of Departing Hope. Campbell, CA: Savas, 1997. ISBN 1-882810-09-0
- Hearn, Chester G., The Capture of New Orleans 1862. Baton Rouge: Louisiana State University Press, 1995. ISBN 0-8071-1945-8
- Hearn, Chester G., Admiral David Dixon Porter: the Civil War Years. Annapolis: Naval Institute Press, 1996. ISBN 1-55750-353-2
- Lewis, Paul, Yankee Admiral: a Biography of David Dixon Porter. David McKay Co., 1968.
- Melia, Tamara Moser, "David Dixon Porter: Fighting Sailor", in Bradford, James C. (ed.), Captains of the Old Steam Navy: Makers of the American Naval Tradition, 1840–1880. Annapolis: Naval Institute Press, 1986. ISBN 0-87021-013-0
- Musicant, Ivan, Divided Waters: the Naval History of the Civil War. New York: HarperCollins, 1995. ISBN 0-06-016482-4
- Porter, David Dixon (1885). Incidents and Anecdotes of the Civil War. New York: D. Appleton and Company. "incidents and anecdotes of the civil war."
- Soley, James Russell (1903). Admiral Porter. New York: D. Appleton.
- Welles, Gideon, The Diary of Gideon Welles (Edgar T. Welles, editor). 3 volumes. New York: Houghton Mifflin, 1911.
- West, Richard S. Jr. (1937). The Second Admiral: a Life of David Dixon Porter. New York: Coward-McCann.

=== Further reading ===
- Porter, David (1875). Memoir of Commodore David Porter, of the United States Navy. Vol. David Dixon Porter. Albany, J. Munsell.
- Porter, David Dixon (1886). The Naval History of the Civil War. McFarland. p. 843.
- Porter, David (1886). Incidents and anecdotes of the Civil War. New York : D. Appleton and co.
- Porter, David (1886). The naval history of the Civil War. New York, The Sherman Publishing Company.
- Butler, Benjamin Franklin (1889). Statement of facts in relation to Admiral D.D. Porter's claim not to have run away from forts St. Philip and Jackson. Boston.
- Porter, David (1890). President Lincoln's entry into Richmond after the evacuation of that place by the Confederates. Belford Clarke Company.
- Homans, James Edward (1899). Our three admirals, Farragut, Porter, Dewey; an authentic account of the heroic characters, distinguished careers. New York, J. T. White & co.

Academic offices
| Preceded by George S. Blake | Superintendent of United States Naval Academy; 1865–1869 | Succeeded by John L. Worden |
