= John Flannagan (Medal of Honor) =

United States Navy sailor and Medal of Honor recipient

- Born: 1852; Ireland
- Military career
- Allegiance: United States of America
- Branch: United States Navy
- Rank: Boatswain's Mate
- Unit: USS Supply
- Awards: Medal of Honor

John Flannagan (1852 – date of death missing) was a United States Navy sailor and a recipient of the United States military's highest decoration, the Medal of Honor.

== Biography ==
Born in 1852 in Ireland, Flannagan immigrated to the United States and joined the Navy from New York. By October 26, 1878, he was serving as a boatswain's mate on the USS Supply. On that day, while Supply was off the coast of Le Havre, France, he rescued Seaman David Walsh from drowning. For this action, he was awarded the Medal of Honor.

Flannagan's official Medal of Honor citation reads:

Serving on board the U.S.S. Supply, Flannagan rescued from drowning David Walsh, seaman, off Le Havre, France, 26 October 1878.

== See also ==
- List of Medal of Honor recipients during peacetime
