= James Flanagan =

James Flanagan is the name of:

- James Flanagan (police officer) (1914–1999), chief constable of the Royal Ulster Constabulary
- James Flanagan (rower) (1884–1937), American rower who won a medal at the 1904 Summer Olympics
- James H. Flanagan (1924–2016), founder of the Society of Our Lady of the Most Holy Trinity (SOLT)
- James L. Flanagan (1925–2015), engineer and researcher for Rutgers University
- J. W. Flanagan (James Winright Flanagan, 1805–1887), U.S. senator from Texas

== See also ==
- Jim Flanigan (born 1971), American football player
- Jim Flanigan Sr. (born 1945), linebacker
