= Thomas Flanagan =

Thomas, Tommy or Tom Flanagan may refer to:

- Thomas Flanagan (bishop) (1930–2019), American Roman Catholic bishop
- Thomas Flanagan (Irish politician) (died 1980), Irish civil engineer and politician
- Thomas Flanagan (priest) (1814–1865), English Roman Catholic canon and historian
- Thomas Flanagan (prospector) (1832–1899), Irish-Australian prospector
- Thomas Flanagan (writer) (1923–2002), American academic and novelist
- Tom Flanagan (footballer) (born 1991), Northern Irish footballer
- Tom Flanagan (political scientist) (born 1944), American-born writer and academic
- Tommy Flanagan (musician) (1930–2001), American jazz pianist
- Tommy Flanagan (actor) (born 1965), Scottish-born actor
- Thomas John (medium) (born 1984), American celebrity medium
- Tommy Flanagan, the Pathological Liar, recurring Saturday Night Live character and sketches portrayed by Jon Lovitz in 1985–86 season
