= List of earthquakes in Illinois =

The following is a list of earthquakes in Illinois.

== Earthquakes ==
Date	Area	Epicenter	Mag.	MMI	Depth (km)	Deaths	Injuries	Total damage / notes	Source
April 18, 2008	7 km (4.3 mi) NNE of Bellmont, Wabash County	38.452°N 87.886°W	5.2 M_{w}	VII	14.3		2	Limited / strike-slip (left lateral)	
June 10, 1987	2 km (1.2 mi) ESE of Claremont, Richland County	38.710°N 87.950°W	5.2 M_{w}	VII	4.6				
September 15, 1972	8 km (5.0 mi) SSW of Amboy, Lee County	41.645°N 89.369°W	4.0 M_{w}	VI	11				
November 9, 1968	5 km (3.1 mi) SSW of Norris City, White County	37.938°N 88.357°W	5.3 M_{w}	VII	15.7			Limited / dip-slip (reverse)	
April 9, 1917	7 km (4.3 mi) S of Fults, Monroe County	38.1°N 90.2°W	5.1 M_{fa}	VII				Damage at St. Louis	
May 26, 1909	3 km (1.9 mi) WNW of Lockport, Will County	41.6°N 88.1°W	5.1 M_{fa}	VII				Damage at Aurora, Kane County	
October 31, 1895	Charleston, Mississippi County, Missouri	36.9°N 89.3°W	5.8 M_{fa}	VIII				Damage at Cairo	
September 27, 1891	Hamilton County	38.25°N 88.5°W	5.2 M_{fa}	VII				Damage at Mount Vernon	
June 9, 1838	Marion County	38.5°N 89.0°W	5.2 M_{fa}	VII					
The inclusion criteria for adding events are based on WikiProject Earthquakes' notability guideline that was developed for stand alone articles. The principles described are also applicable to lists. In summary, only damaging, injurious, or deadly events should be recorded.

== See also ==
- 1811–1812 New Madrid earthquakes
- Geology of Illinois
- Illinois Basin
- New Madrid seismic zone
- Sandwich Fault Zone
- Wabash Valley seismic zone
