= Cairo Rail Bridge =

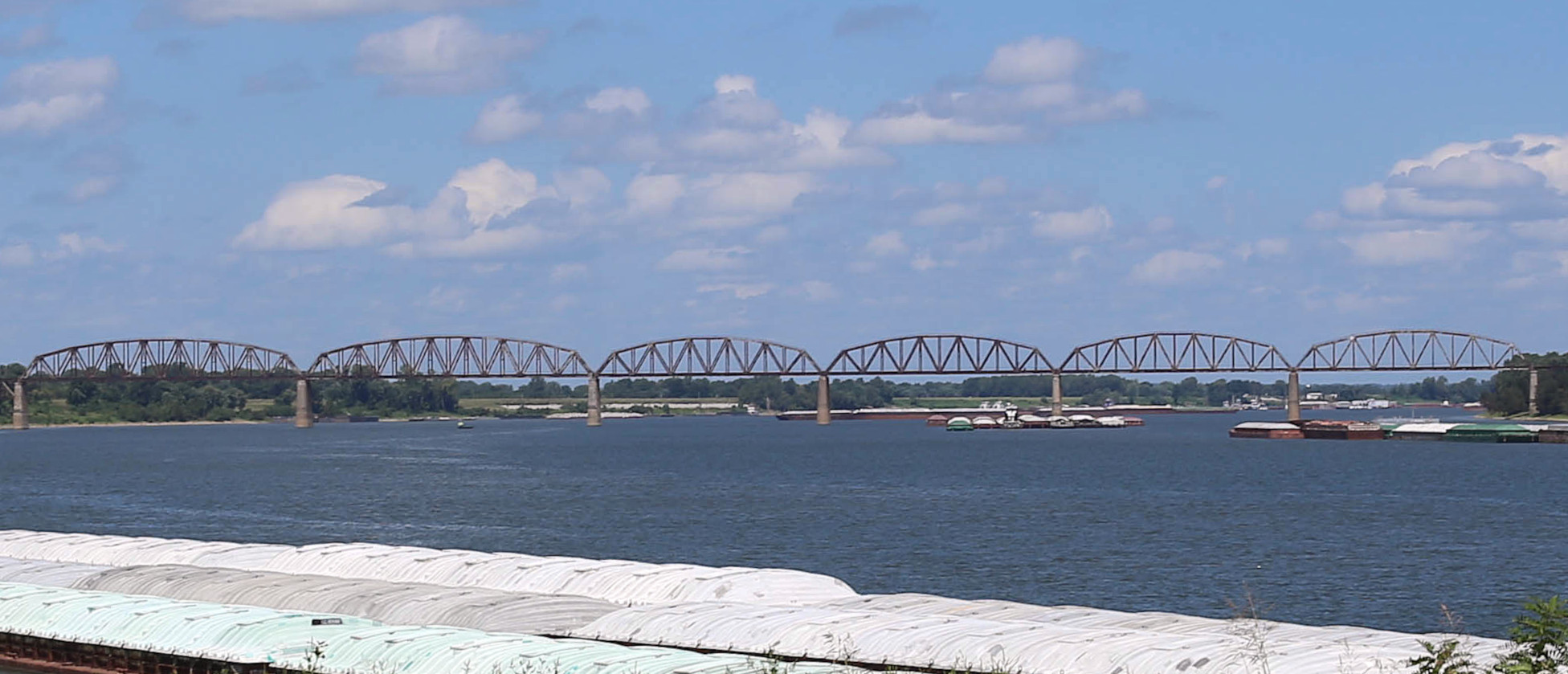
- Coordinates: 37.023056°N 89.175556°W
- Carries: Single track of Canadian National Railway (formerly Illinois Central Railroad)
- Crosses: Ohio River
- Locale: Wickliffe, Kentucky and Cairo, Illinois

Characteristics
- Design: Simple truss bridge, with steel trestle approaches
- Total length: 20,461 ft (6,237 m) (including approaches)
- Longest span: 518.5 ft (158.0 m)

History
- Opened: October 29, 1889, rebuilt 1949-1952

Location
- Interactive map of Cairo Rail Bridge

Cairo Rail Bridge is the name of two bridges crossing the Ohio River near Cairo, Illinois, in the United States. The original was an 1889 George S. Morison through-truss and deck truss bridge, replaced by the current bridge in 1952. The second and current bridge is a through-truss bridge that reused many of the original bridge piers. As of 2018, trains like the City of New Orleans travel over the Ohio River supported by the same piers whose construction began in 1887.

== Original bridge ==
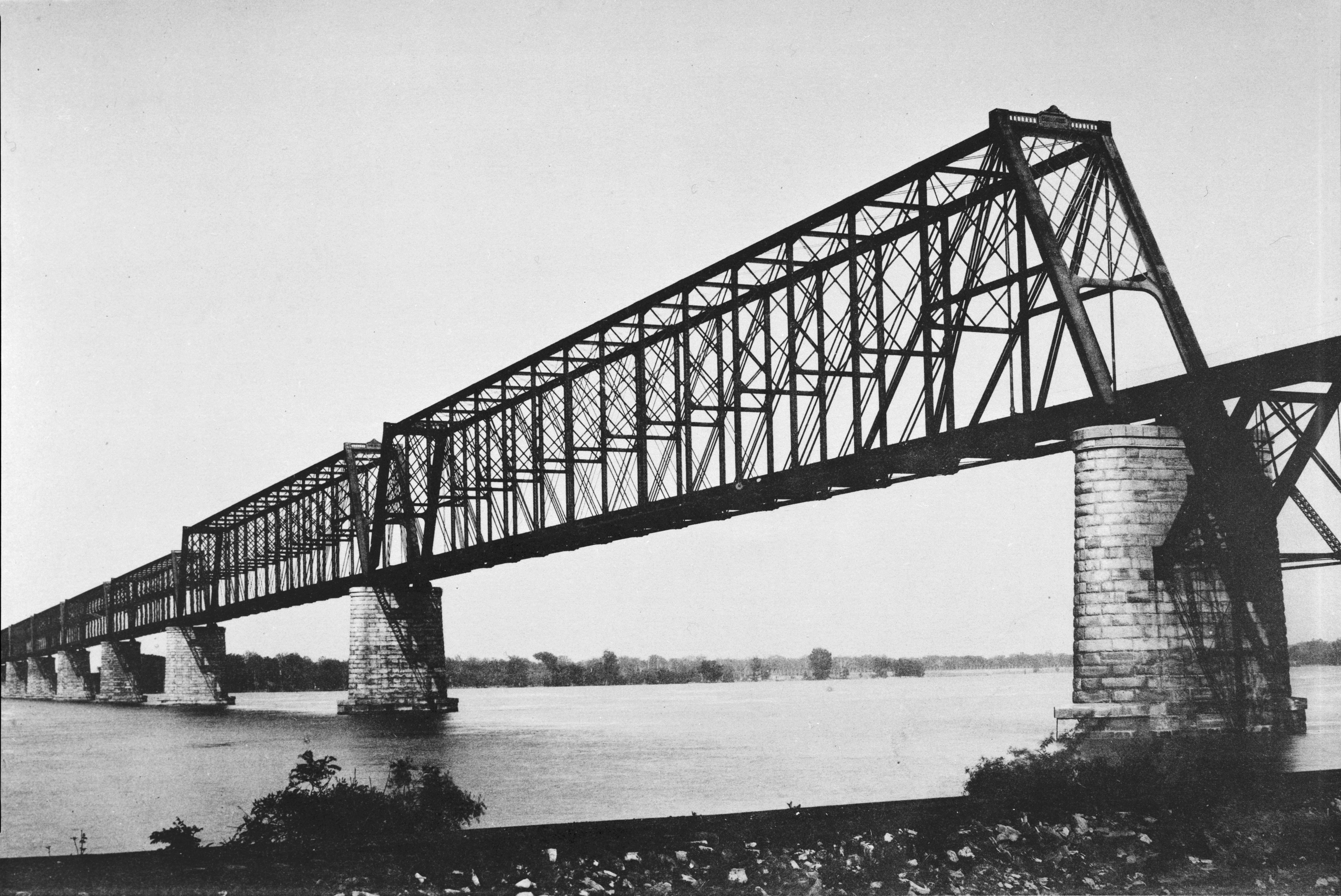
The Cairo Rail Bridge as it appeared in 1892

On July 1, 1887, construction began on the first caisson for the foundations of the bridge piers. The first caisson descended into the riverbed at a rate of around 4 inches (100 mm) per day. Two men died and several more were seriously injured sealing the first caisson at a depth of 77 feet (23 m). Despite increased precautions following the deaths, a total of five men died of decompression sickness during construction. February 19, 1889, the last pier was completed. The first train crossed the bridge from Illinois to Kentucky on October 29, 1889. Work continued until it was turned over to the railroad on March 1, 1890. Total cost of the structure exceeded $2.6 million, with nearly $1.2 million for the substructure alone. In order to comply with regulations meant to allow steam boat travel on the Ohio, the bridge was required to be 53 feet (16 m) above the river's high-water mark. This resulted in the structure extending nearly 250 feet (76 m) from the bottom of the deepest foundation to the top of the highest iron work. The bridge, substructure and superstructure weighed 194.6 million pounds (88,270 t), excluding the approaches.

On October 31, 1895, a magnitude 6.6 earthquake on the New Madrid Seismic Zone with an epicenter at Charleston, Missouri, cracked a pier on the bridge. The quake is the biggest quake since the 1812 New Madrid earthquake which at 8.3 was the biggest recorded quake in the contiguous United States.

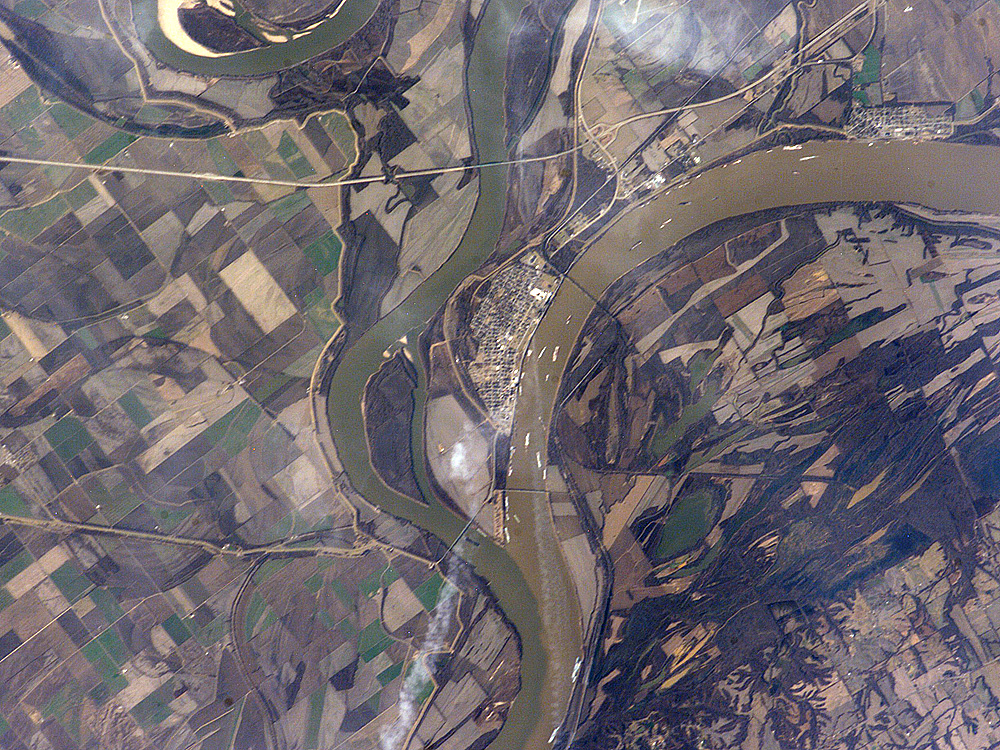
Confluence of the Mississippi and Ohio Rivers at Cairo, Illinois. The railroad bridge is located top center in the photograph.

Cairo bridge's two 518.5 ft (158.0 m) main spans were the longest pin-connected Whipple truss spans ever built. Pier IX, the largest, alone weighed 11,000 short tons (10,000 t). At the time, the bridge was the largest and most expensive ever undertaken in the United States. At 10,580 feet (3,220 m), it was the longest metallic structure in the world. Its total length was 20,461 ft (6,237 m) including wooden approach trestles. Its construction completed the first rail link between Chicago and New Orleans and revolutionized north–south rail travel along the Mississippi River.

== See also ==
- List of bridges documented by the Historic American Engineering Record in Illinois
