= 2006 Gulf of Mexico earthquake =

Earthquake off the coast of Florida, United States

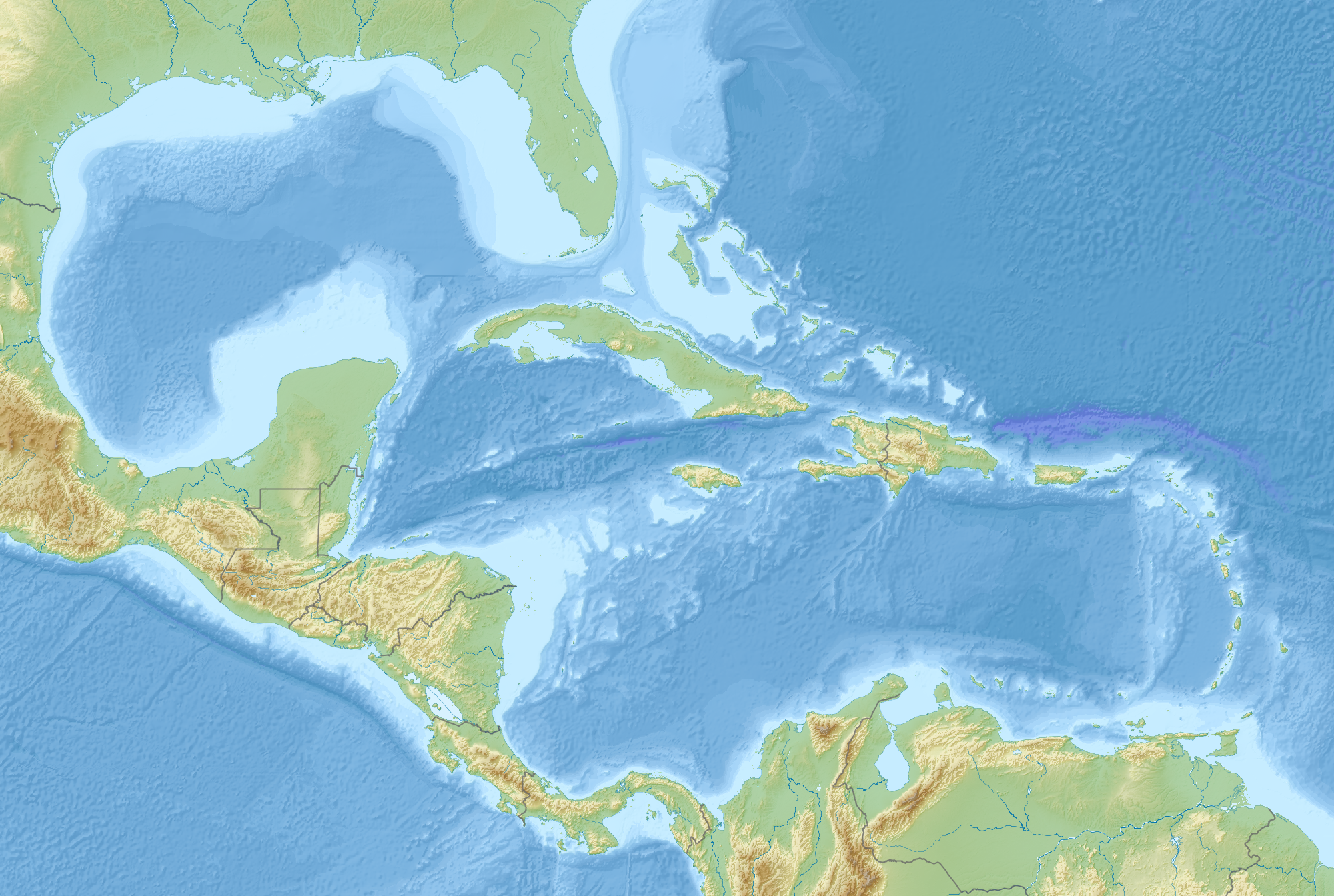
- Location within Middle America Location within Florida
- UTC time: 2006-09-10 14:56:08
- ISC event: 8659780
- USGS-ANSS: ComCat
- Local date: September 10, 2006
- Local time: 10:56 EDT
- Duration: ~ 20 seconds
- Magnitude: 5.9 M_{w}
- Depth: 14 km (9 mi)
- Epicenter: 26.25°N 86.63°W
- Type: Reverse
- Areas affected: Southeastern United States
- Max. intensity: MMI IV (Light)
- Casualties: None

The 2006 Gulf of Mexico earthquake occurred in the eastern Gulf of Mexico on September 10 at 10:56 AM Eastern Daylight Time. The intraplate earthquake measured 5.9 on the moment magnitude scale and its epicenter was located about 250 miles (400 km) west-southwest of Anna Maria, Florida. The event was felt throughout much of the Gulf Coast of the United States and was the second earthquake of magnitude 5 or greater in the Gulf during 2006. Felt intensities, as measured on the Mercalli intensity scale, were as high as IV (Light) in Florida, with parts of Georgia at III (Weak).

== Characteristics ==
The quake was reportedly felt along the gulf coast and as far north as Georgia. The earthquake was the strongest in the Gulf of Mexico in 33 years and was an intraplate earthquake, an event that takes place away from the borders of tectonic plates (where most tectonic activity takes place). Earthquakes in the Southeastern United States are not common, but several strong events have occurred in the region. In 1879 close to St. Augustine, Florida, an earthquake damaged plaster and forced dishes off counters, and in South Carolina the 1886 Charleston earthquake caused severe damage and was responsible for the deaths of sixty people.

The event occurred near the Cuba Fracture Zone and was well away from the edge of the North American plate. Randy Cox, an associate professor of earth science at the University of Memphis in Tennessee stated that the source of strain was the Mid-Atlantic Ridge, where seafloor spreading was causing compression of the North American plate. A magnitude 5.2 event in February 2006 may have been associated with the same fault zone.

The epicenter of the earthquake was too far offshore for it to be well covered by onshore seismographs and the event's characteristics are therefore poorly understood. The focal mechanism indicated reverse faulting. The focal depth of between 14–31 km show that it occurred within the seismogenic zone, rather than on any of the many shallow growth faults in the area. The earthquake led to a reassessment of the geohazard for hydrocarbon exploration and production facilities in the Gulf.

Several thousand people reported the event to the United States Geological Survey but none reported any damage from the 20 second earthquake. Items were knocked from shelves and seiches were observed in swimming pools in parts of Florida where felt intensities were reported as high as IV, including Orlando in Central Florida, Brooksville on the west coast, Titusville on the east coast, and Panama City in the panhandle. In Atlanta, Georgia, the intensity was reported to be at level III.

== See also ==
- List of earthquakes in 2006
- List of earthquakes in the United States
- 2026 Gulf of Mexico earthquake Larger similar earthquake occurring nearby 20 years later
