= Charleston earthquake =

Charleston earthquake may refer to:

- 1886 Charleston earthquake
- 1895 Charleston earthquake
