= Wabash Valley =

Region in Illinois and Indiana

Coordinates: 38°50′N 87°30′W

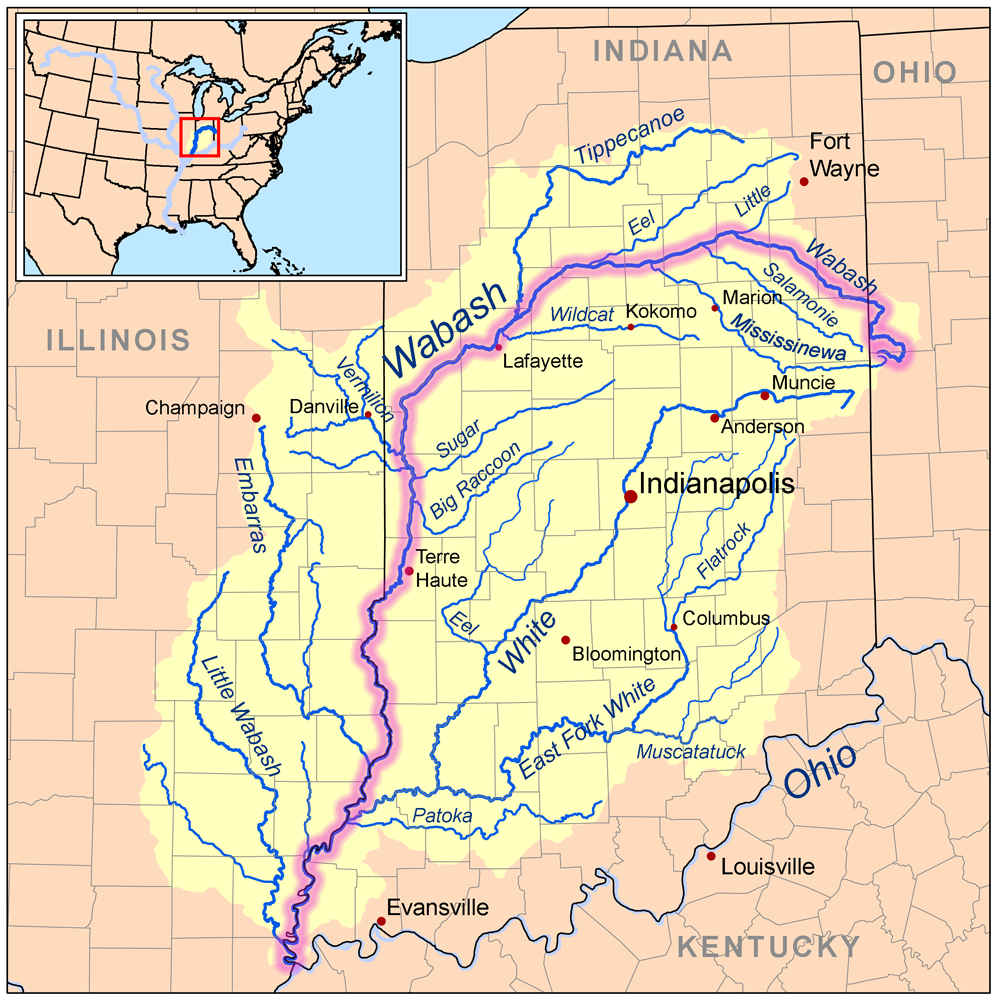
The Wabash River, shown within its drainage basin.

The Wabash Valley is a region located in sections of both Illinois and Indiana. It is named for the Wabash River and, as the name is typically used, spans the middle to the middle-lower portion of the river's valley and is centered at Terre Haute, Indiana. The term Wabash Valley is frequently used in local media in Clinton, Lafayette, Mount Carmel, Princeton, Terre Haute, and Vincennes all of which are either on or near the Lower Wabash River.

== Counties ==
Counties in the Wabash Valley include Posey, Gibson, Vigo, Clay, Sullivan, Vermillion, Parke, Greene, Putnam, Owen, Knox, Daviess, Martin, Fountain, Tippecanoe and Warren counties in Indiana. The Illinois portion consists of Clark, Edgar, Crawford, Jasper, Cumberland, Coles, Douglas, Gallatin, Edwards, Wabash, and White counties. It also may or may not include, depending on the source, Montgomery county in Indiana, and Lawrence, Richland, Vermillion, Champaign, Clay, and Effingham counties in Illinois due to the Little Wabash River.

== Seismic activity ==
The Wabash Valley Fault System in southeastern Illinois, southwestern Indiana, and adjacent corner of Kentucky extends about 60 miles north-northeastward from just north of the Shawneetown and Rough Creek Fault Zones. A Magnitude 5.2 quake took place in the Wabash zone on April 18, 2008, at 09:37 UTC (04:37 CDT), about 41 miles NNW of Evansville, Indiana, near the community of Bellmont, Illinois. It was felt all across southern Illinois, southern Indiana, western and central Kentucky and eastern Missouri, waking people up in Chicago and St. Louis, 123 miles away. This was followed by several aftershocks and a second, magnitude 4.6 quake at 15:14 UTC (10:14 CDT). There were no injuries or serious damage reported late Friday morning, April 18, 2008. In Mt. Carmel, Illinois, 15 southeast of the epicenter, a woman was reported trapped in her home by a collapsed porch but was quickly freed and wasn't hurt, said Mickie Smith, a police dispatcher there.

The earthquake occurred on the 102nd anniversary of the 1906 San Francisco earthquake.

The largest quake to have taken place in this Zone was a 5.4 earthquake in 1968.
