= 2026 Gulf of Mexico earthquake =

Earthquake off the coast of Florida, United States

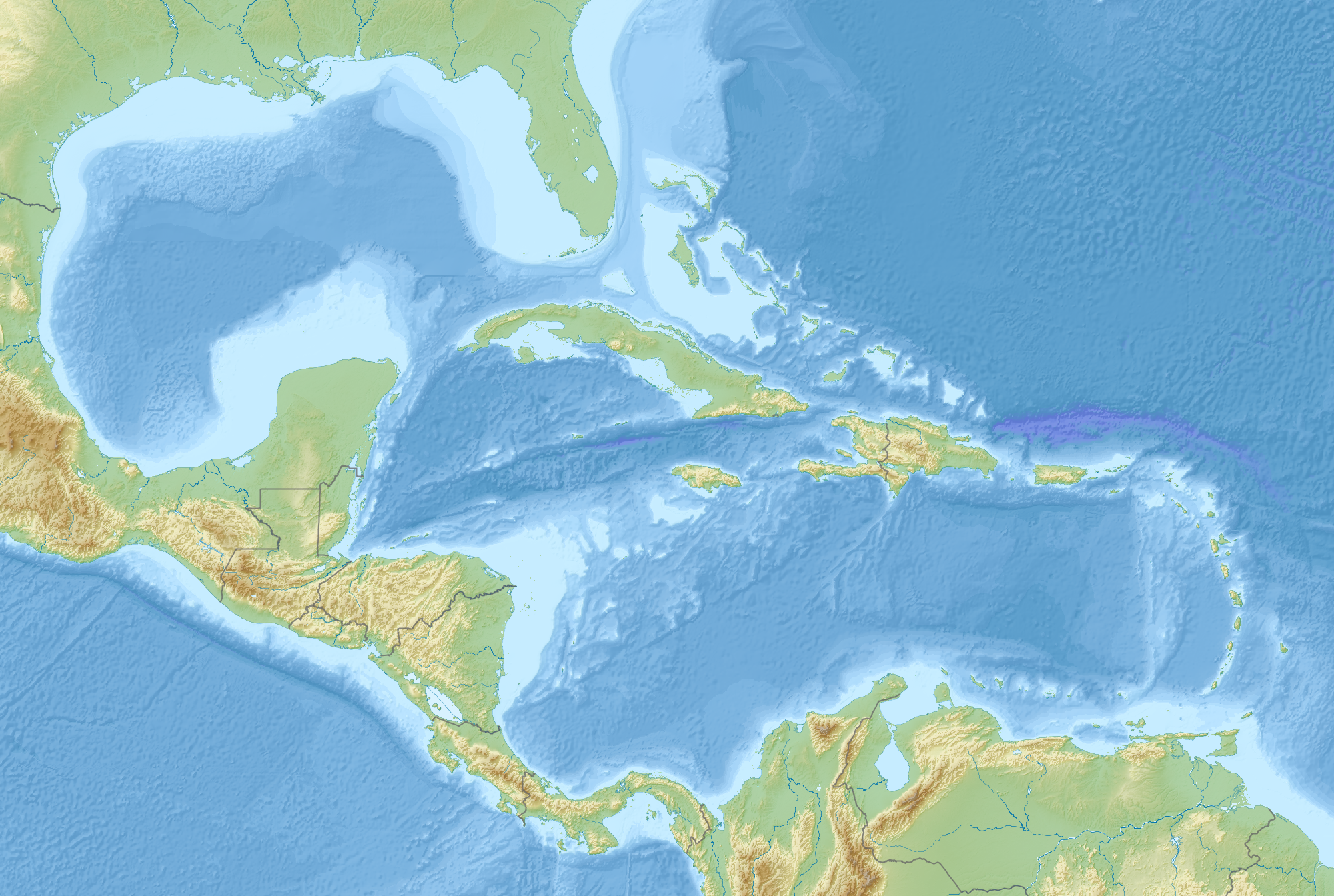
- Location within Middle America Location within Cuba
- UTC time: 2026-06-08 18:00:27
- ISC event
- USGS-ANSS: ComCat
- Local date: June 8, 2026
- Local time: 14:00:27 EDT
- Duration: ~ 20 seconds
- Magnitude: 6.1 M_{w}
- Depth: 26 km (16 mi)
- Epicenter: 22.791°N 85.092°W
- Type: Reverse
- Areas affected: Cuba, Yucatan Peninsula, Florida
- Max. intensity: MMI V (Moderate)
- Casualties: None

The 2026 Gulf of Mexico earthquake occurred in the southeastern Gulf of Mexico on June 8 at 2:00 PM Eastern Daylight Time. The intraplate earthquake measured 6.1 on the moment magnitude scale and its epicenter was located about 99 kilometres (62 mi) west-northwest of Mantua, Cuba. The event was felt throughout much of Cuba, the Yucatan Peninsula, and Florida, and was the second earthquake of magnitude 6 or greater recorded in the Gulf. Felt intensities, as measured on the Mercalli intensity scale, were as high as V (Moderate) in Cuba, with parts of Florida and Yucatan at IV (Light).

== Effects ==
The quake caused minor to moderate damage in Mexico with damage to buildings and road subsidence reported in the latter. Whether damage occurred was unknown in Cuba. Tremors were felt across most of Florida as far away as Jacksonville with thousands of submissions of reports to the USGS in the three affected countries. Rides at Walt Disney World were temporarily closed for inspection for minutes to hours before reopening. In South Florida, many buildings were evacuated as a precaution to the tremors. Tsunami risks were declared nonexistent and no coastal evacuations were made.

== See also ==
- List of earthquakes in 2026
- List of earthquakes in Cuba
- 2006 Gulf of Mexico earthquake similar earthquake occurring nearby 20 years earlier
