= List of earthquakes in Cuba =

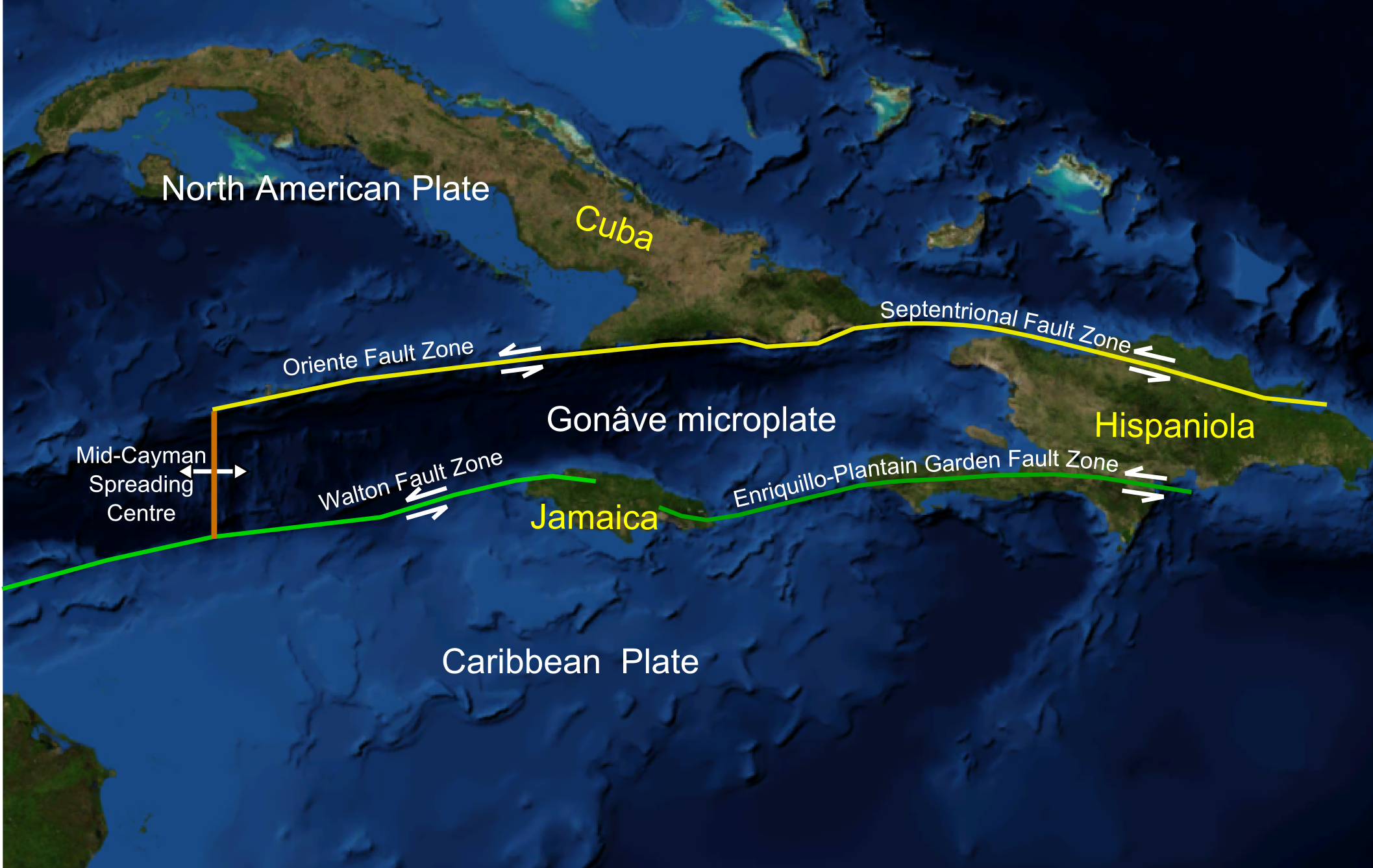
Map showing the regional tectonic setting of the Oriente fault zone

Cuba is located in an area with several active fault systems which produce on average about 2000 seismic events each year. While most registered seismic events pass unnoticed, the island has been struck by a number of destructive earthquakes over the past four centuries, including several major quakes with a magnitude of 7.0 or above.

Approximately 70% of seismic activity in Cuba emanates from the Oriente fault zone, located in the Bartlett-Cayman fault system which runs along the south-eastern coast of Cuba and marks the tectonic boundary between the North American plate and the Caribbean plate. The 12 currently active faults in Cuba also include the Cauto-Nipe, Cochinos and Nortecubana faults. Destructive earthquakes originating from the Oriente fault occurred in 1766 (M_{I}= 7.6), 1852 (M_{I} = 7.2) and 1932 (M_{s} = 6.75). Some studies suggested there is a high probability the Oriente fault would produce a magnitude 7 earthquake, this happening in January 2020, with a magnitude of 7.7, the highest registered in this country's history.

Notable earthquakes in recent Cuban history include the following:

Name	Date	Epicentre	M	Intensity	Depth	Notes	Deaths
1578 Cuba earthquake	August 1578	Santiago de Cuba	6.8	VIII	30 km	Magnitude estimated at 6.8 M_{L} on the Richter scale, intensity at VIII EMS-98.	
1580 Cuba earthquake	1580-12-19	Santiago de Cuba					
1632 Cuba earthquake	October 1632	Santiago de Cuba					
1675 Cuba earthquake	1675-02-11	Santiago de Cuba	5.8	VII	30 km	Magnitude estimated at 5.8 M_{L} on the Richter scale, intensity at VII EMS-98.	
1678 Cuba earthquake	1678-02-11; 14:59	Santiago de Cuba	6.8	VIII	30 km	Magnitude estimated at 6.8 M_{L} on the Richter scale, intensity at VIII EMS-98.	
1679 Cuba earthquake	1679-02-11	Santiago de Cuba					
1682 Cuba earthquake	1682	Santiago de Cuba	5.8	VII	30 km	Magnitude estimated at 5.8 M_{L} on the Richter scale, intensity at VII EMS-98.	
1693 Cuba earthquake	July 1693	Havana				"1,500 houses thrown down"	
1757 Cuba earthquake	1757-12-14	Santiago de Cuba					
1766 Cuba earthquake	1766-06-11; 05:14	Santiago de Cuba	7.6 M_{I}	IX	35 km	Magnitude estimated at 7.6 M_{L} on the Richter scale, intensity at IX EMS-98.	120
1826 Cuba earthquake	1826-09-18; 09:26	Santiago de Cuba	5.8	VII	30 km	Magnitude estimated at 5.8 M_{L} on the Richter scale, intensity at VII EMS-98.	
1842 Cuba earthquake	1842-07-07	Santiago de Cuba	6.0	VII	30 km	Magnitude estimated at 6.0 M_{L} on the Richter scale, intensity at VII EMS-98.	
1852 Cuba earthquake	1852-08-20; 14:05 UTC	Santiago de Cuba	7.2 M_{I}	IX	30 km	Intensity estimated at IX EMS-98, with 26 heavy aftershocks. Caused severe damage to churches and other buildings in Santiago de Cuba, as well as landslides in the Sierra Maestra region. Shaking felt in the whole of eastern Cuba, up to the islands of Jamaica and Hispaniola.	
1852 Cuba earthquake (November)	1852-11-26; 08:37 GMT	Santiago de Cuba, Sierra Maestra	7.0	VIII	35 km		
1858 Cuba earthquake	1858-01-28; 22:04	Santiago de Cuba	6.5	VII	30 km		
1880 Cuba earthquake	1880-01-23; 04:39	San Cristóbal/Vuelta Abajo (Pinar del Río)	6.0	VIII	15 km	A series of severe shock waves originating from western Cuba were also felt in the town of Key West (Florida), and included a strong earthquake on 23 January 1880 in San Cristóbal, Pinar del Río at 4 a.m.	
1903 Cuba earthquake	1903-09-22; 08:09	Santiago de Cuba	5.7	VII	30 km		
1906 Cuba earthquake	1906-06-22; 07:09	Santiago de Cuba	6.2	VII	30 km		
1914 Cuba earthquake	1914-02-28; 05:19	Gibara	6.2	VII	32 km		
1914 Cuba earthquake	1914-12-25; 05:19	Santiago de Cuba	6.7	VII	30 km		
1932 Cuba earthquake	1932-02-03	20.000°N 75.800°W; Santiago de Cuba	6.75 mb	VIII		Intensity estimated at VIII EMS-98. 8 – 1500 deaths, 300 injured. 80% of buildings in Santiago de Cuba affected., with damage totaling 15 million Pesos.	8
1947 Cuba earthquake	1947-08-07; 00:40:20 UTC	19.75°N 75.32°W Santiago de Cuba	6.8	VIII	50 km	Magnitude estimated at 6.8 M_{L} and intensity VIII EMS-98.	
1992 Cuba earthquake	1992-05-25; 16:55:04 UTC	19.613°N 77.872°W; Cabo Cruz, Pilón–Manzanillo	6.9 M_{s}	VII	23 km	A strong earthquake struck the Cabo Cruz sector, leaving 40 people injured and more than 820 buildings damaged in the Pilon-Manzanillo area.	-
2020 Caribbean earthquake	2020-01-28 14:10 UTC	19.419°N 78.756°W Caribbean Sea	7.7 M_{w}	VI	14.9 km	One house collapsed and more than 300 were damaged.	-
2024 Cuba earthquake	2024-11-10; 16:49 UTC	19.419°N 78.756°W; Bartolomé Masó, Granma	6.8 M_{w}	VII	14.0 km	-	-
2026 Gulf of Mexico earthquake	2026-06-08 18:00:25.689 UTC	22.801°N 85.139°W ± 6.7 km	6.1	?	10.0 km±1.9	-	-

M = Magnitude on the Richter scale (M_{L}), except where noted

Intensity= Intensity on the European macroseismic scale (EMS-98), which is somewhat similar to the Modified Mercalli scale (MM)

== See also ==
- Geology of Cuba
