= 2008 Illinois earthquake =

Earthquake in Illinois, USA

- Location within the United States
- UTC time: 2008-04-18 09:36:59
- ISC event: 10882140
- USGS-ANSS: ComCat
- Local date: April 18, 2008
- Local time: 4:36 am CST
- Magnitude: 5.2 M_{w}^{(USGS)}
- Depth: 14.3 km (9 mi)
- Epicenter: 38.45°N 87.89°W
- Type: Strike-slip
- Areas affected: Midwestern United States
- Total damage: Limited
- Max. intensity: MMI VII (Very strong)
- Casualties: 2 injured

The 2008 Illinois earthquake was one of the largest earthquakes ever recorded in the Midwest state of Illinois. This moderate strike-slip shock measured 5.2 on the moment magnitude scale and had a maximum Mercalli intensity of VII (Very strong). It occurred at 04:36:59 local time on April 18 near Bellmont and Mount Carmel, Illinois, within the Wabash Valley seismic zone. Earthquakes in this part of the country are often felt at great distances.

== Tectonic setting ==
Situated in a stable continental region of the Midwestern United States, the Wabash Valley seismic zone (WVSZ) is an area of dispersed seismic activity that encompasses the border areas of Illinois, Indiana, and Kentucky. This broad, multistate zone of intraplate seismicity lay just to the north of the New Madrid seismic zone and comprises both strike-slip and dip-slip earthquake mechanisms across numerous named faults, grabens, and anticlines.

== Earthquake ==
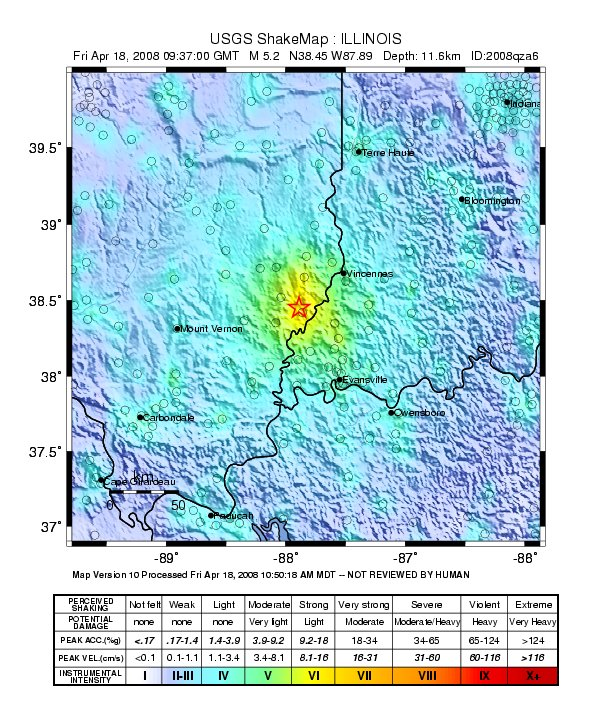
USGS ShakeMap for the event

Rapid development and expansion of services from the United States Geological Survey was taking place in the 2000s in terms of earthquake monitoring and information dissemination services. A number of products from it and its subdivisions that relay information to the public over the Internet were displayed during the event. An automated system from the National Earthquake Information Center, for example, sent an initial notification containing magnitude, depth, and location within two and a half minutes of the mainshock.

=== Felt area ===
The shock was felt as far west as Omaha, Nebraska, as far south as Atlanta, Georgia, as far east as Kitchener, Ontario, and West Virginia, and as far north as the Upper Peninsula of Michigan. The earthquake was felt so far away, compared to earthquakes in other regions, because the old, rigid bedrock beneath much of the Midwest allows the seismic waves to propagate further.

=== Damage ===
Close to the epicenter in Mount Carmel, Illinois, a woman was briefly unable to exit her home due to a collapsed porch, and a two-story apartment building was evacuated because of loose and falling bricks. The Edwards County sheriff's department took reports of minor damage in West Salem, Illinois. Just across the Wabash River in Indiana, Unit 4 at the Gibson Generating Station automatically shut down due to its vibration sensors, and in Princeton, a woman was cut when a crystal figurine was knocked from a shelf in her home. A man had an eye injury at an unknown location, but medical attention was not sought.

In Louisville, Kentucky, some bricks broke off from an older building near downtown. Slightly further away in St. Louis, Missouri, a portion of the South Kingshighway Boulevard viaduct were closed because of loose pieces of concrete, but whether this was debris-related is unknown, and traffic resumed half an hour later. Several chimneys also collapsed in south St. Louis, the St. Francis de Sales Oratory reported damage to its steeple, and the Basilica of St. Louis King of France reported small fragments from the mosaic ceiling. About 35,000 people in St. Louis County were without power because the Labadie Power Station went offline due to excessive vibrations. Power was restored by midmorning.

Illinois, Indiana, and Kentucky state highway crews investigated if any roads or bridges were damaged in the area. Cracks were reported on U.S. Route 51 near Cairo at the state's southern tip. No roads were reported to be damaged in Kentucky, but inspections were being conducted in the Louisville, Paducah, and Henderson districts, according to the Kentucky Department of Transportation.

=== Aftershocks ===
More than 250 aftershocks ranging in magnitude from 0.7 to 4.6 were documented in the month following the mainshock, including the largest, which occurred later in the morning. The other stand-out shocks in the sequence were the M4 event on April 21, an M4.2 event on April 25, and a M3.4 shock on June 5 CDT.

== Response ==
Many precautionary measures were taken, including several evacuations. All Vincennes University dormitories were evacuated as a precaution, but no damage was discovered and students were allowed to return after about 45 minutes. A coal mine in Gibson County, Indiana, was also evacuated, but miners returned to work shortly afterwards. The Gibson County 9-1-1 system was briefly knocked offline due to a flood of calls, but after about 15 minutes, service was restored.

== See also ==
- List of earthquakes in 2008
- List of earthquakes in Illinois
- List of earthquakes in the United States
