= 1766 Cuba earthquake =

Natural disaster

- Location within Cuba
- Local date: 11 June 1766
- Local time: 00:00
- Magnitude: 6.8 M_{s}
- Depth: 25 km (16 mi)
- Epicenter: 19.9°N 76.1°W
- Fault: Septentrional-Oriente fault zone
- Type: Strike-slip
- Areas affected: Cuba
- Max. intensity: MSK-64 IX (Destructive)
- Aftershocks: Yes, for 66 days
- Casualties: 34–40, 700 injured

The southern part of Cuba was struck by a major earthquake on 12 June 1766 at midnight local time. It had an estimated magnitude of 6.8 M_{s} and a maximum felt intensity of IX (destructive) on the MSK scale. Its epicenter was offshore, near Santiago de Cuba, with a focal depth of 25 km. Santiago de Cuba suffered the worst damage, although large areas of Cuba were affected. It was felt in both Havana (800 km) and on Jamaica (140 km). Between 34 and 40 people died and a further 700 were injured.

== Tectonic setting ==
The southernmost coast of Cuba lies adjacent to the southern margin of the North American plate. This boundary is a major left lateral (sinistral) transform fault, the Septentrional-Oriente fault zone, where the North American plate is moving westwards relative to the Gonâve microplate at a rate of between 6 and 11 mm per year. This fault zone forms the most seismically active part of Cuba.

== Earthquake ==
The earthquake struck at midnight and lasted for between one and a half and seven minutes. From the observed seismic intensities, the epicenter is likely to have been offshore, although its precise location is unknown. The mainshock was followed by a series of aftershocks, that continued for a further 66 days. From its estimated location, it is interpreted to have been caused by rupture of the Septentrional-Oriente fault zone.

== Damage ==
The intensity of shaking was at a maximum at Morro Castle and La Socapa Fort, with an estimated value of IX (Destructive), due to their proximity to the epicentre and the presence of thick alluvial deposits. Levels of VIII (Damaging) were reached in the cities of Santiago de Cuba and Bayamo. Morro Castle and La Socapa Fort were destroyed as were the hospital and the governor's house. Santiago de Cuba's cathedral was damaged. The earthquake is recorded to have caused the deaths of between 34 and 40 inhabitants, all of them in Santiago de Cuba. A further 700 people were injured.

== See also ==
- List of earthquakes in Cuba
- List of earthquakes in the Caribbean
- List of historical earthquakes
