= Sandwich Fault Zone =

Fault Zone in Illinois, USA

The Sandwich Fault Zone is a fault zone that runs northwest from Oswego to Ogle County, transecting Lee County in Northern Illinois. The fault has generally not been active, although a minor earthquake was reported in 2002 and 2010. It has a largely 400 to 600-foot vertical displacement, although parts can reach up to an 800-foot displacement, and is likely a configuration of several smaller faults, varying in both direction and displacement.

== See also ==
- List of earthquakes in Illinois
