= 1932 Cuba earthquake =

Earthquake in Cuba

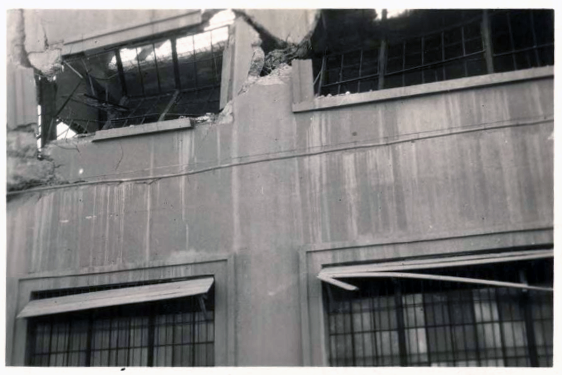
- Debris and damage of Swift & Co. building (second floor) in Santiago after earthquake.
- UTC time: 1932-02-03 06:16:02
- ISC event
- USGS-ANSS: ComCat
- Local date: February 3, 1932
- Local time
- Magnitude: M_{w} 6.7
- Depth: 25.0 km (15.5 mi)
- Epicenter: 19.682°N 75.677°W
- Total damage: US$10,000,000
- Max. intensity: VI (Strong)
- Peak acceleration: 0.158 g
- Peak velocity: 2.84 cm/s
- Casualties: 8-12 dead, 300 injured

The 1932 Cuba earthquake occurred on 3 February 1932 at 6:16 UTC in Santiago de Cuba. It had a magnitude of 6.7 on the moment magnitude scale and a maximum perceived intensity of VI (Strong) on the Mercalli intensity scale. The epicenter of the earthquake was on the northern edge of the Bartlett Deep, approximately thirty miles from Santiago. The event resulted in at least 8 dead and 300 injured.

== Background ==
The Septentrional–Oriente fault zone is a strike-slip fault system that runs along Cuba's southern edge. A study conducted by professor Stephen Taber, who had been in Santiago during the earthquake, found new faults had formed prior to 3 February.

A strong seismic tremor was recorded at around five o'clock in the evening the day of. However, it did not raise significant alarm as such occurrences were common, the city notable for having high seismic activity in the West Indies.

== Aftermath ==
There were reports of 8-12 fatalities, and approximately 300 people sustained injuries from the collapse of various structures, including hospitals, schools, and industrial facilities. Because of the damage and foundational instability of Santiago’s prisons, the inmates were transferred to nearby military barracks.

== See also ==
- List of earthquakes in 1932
- List of earthquakes in Cuba
