= Marianna Fault =

Fault in eastern Arkansas

- Year defined: 2009
- Location: Crowley's Ridge area
- Country: USA
- State: Arkansas

Characteristics
- Length: 7 Miles

Location of Marianna

The Marianna Fault is a fault located in the Crowley's Ridge area west of Marianna in eastern Arkansas.

The discovery was first announced by seismologists on January 21, 2009. It is separate from the New Madrid seismic zone, which is 100 kilometers (62 mi) to the east.

Haydar Al-Shukri, director of the Arkansas Earthquake Center at the University of Arkansas at Little Rock, discovered the Marianna Fault after searching for a fault since 2005. The fault line is seven miles long, with 110 meters (360 ft) dimensions. The land above the Marianna Fault is mostly cotton fields, but the presence of fertile soil with stretches of fine sand alerted seismologists to the fault's existence. It is believed that the Marianna Fault has previously experienced an earthquake that would have measured 7.0 on the Richter scale, and may well do so again. Al-Shukri believes that the fault was created 5,000 years ago.

Previously, the predicted earthquake damage Marianna, Arkansas might receive from the more distant New Madrid Fault suffering a 7.0 earthquake was 100% architectural and content damage, half of all bridges suffering some damage, 2,955 displaced residents, and loss of phones and electricity. The capital city of Arkansas, Little Rock, would also face damage. A major natural gas pipeline is located near the fault, and could be devastated by any such earthquake. Tennessee and Mississippi would possibly be affected as well.

In 2006, a letter to the Seismological Research Letters indicated the possible existence of a fault at Marianna. Sand blows in the area were similar in size to the New Madrid sand blows, giving rise to the speculation of a new fault. It was believed that the Marianna sand blows were created between 5,000 and 7,000 years ago. This followed a letter to the same journal a few months before saying that ground-penetrating radar (GPR) was being used to study "large elliptical sand deposits" near Marianna.

Haydar Al-Shukri announced the discovery of the Marianna Fault on January 21, 2009. Days later, Al-Shukri stated that more funding was required to study the fault, which would include trying to establish whether or not the fault was still active. The lack of seismic equipment in the vicinity is one factor in the need for additional funding.

The most recent earthquake activity in the area around the fault was located ten miles northeast of Marianna in August 2008. It measured 2.6 on the Richter scale. Few quakes have been felt in the area since 1994.
