= Geology of Cuba =

The geology of Cuba differs significantly from that of other Caribbean islands because of ancient 900 million year old Precambrian Proterozoic metamorphic rocks in the Santa Clara province and extensive Jurassic and Cretaceous outcrops.

Western and central Cuba are an orogenic belt—mountains formed by crumpling and uplift—created by the collision of an island arc in the Cretaceous with the Florida-Bahamas platform. As a result, the Cuban ophiolite zone became obducted (rock scraped off the Caribbean plate and accumulated on the North American plate) and a northward verging fold and thrust belt formed. The Paleocene and Eocene epochs also saw a small amount of mountain-building.

Eastern Cuba, southeast of the Cauto Basin, by contrast has a Cenozoic volcanic arc complex, with ophiolites (off-scrapings) north and east of the Sierra Maestra as Mesozoic-age orogen rocks overlain by Paleogene sedimentary rocks and tuff. Sedimentation due to the tectonic activity continued into the Oligocene.

The Jagua Formation in western Cuba has yielded numerous fossils of marine reptiles and pterosaurs.

== Structural geology ==
- Pinar Del Rio Block:
  - Esperanze zone: Thin belt of Jurassic and Cretaceous limestone, dolomite and evaporite in the west found in Cayo Coco and Los Remedios zones. Deformed by thrust faulting into three nappes.
  - Sierra del Rosario zone: Antiformal arrangement of three nappes with Jurassic-Cretaceous ophiolites, siliceous slates, mafic and intermediate lava. The Quinones subzone in the component Bahia Honda subzone includes Maastrichtian limestone in thrust sheets. The Cinco Pesos subzone is the south-dipping limb of the Roasario antiform.

== Earthquakes ==
Cuba is located in an area with several active fault systems which produce on average about 2,000 seismic events each year. While most registered seismic events pass unnoticed, the island has been struck by a number of destructive earthquakes over the past four centuries, including several major quakes with a magnitude of 7.0 or above. The most recent strong earthquake occurred in 1992 when the main tremor measured 6.9 on the Richter Scale. This was followed by a magnitude 7.7 quake on January 28, 2020.
