= New Madrid seismic zone =

Major seismic zone in the southern and midwestern United States

Coordinates: 36.58°N 89.59°W

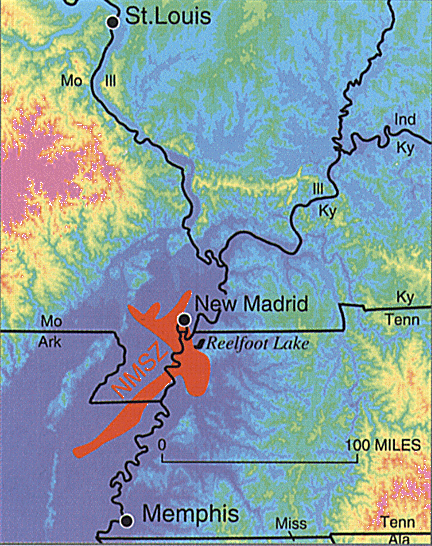
Reelfoot Rift and the New Madrid seismic zone in a 3D topographic image

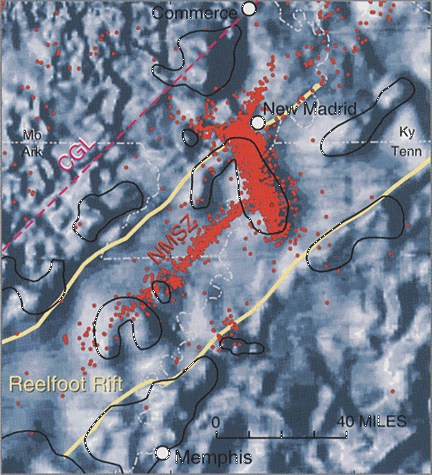
Magnetic potential map of the Reelfoot Rift

The New Madrid seismic zone (NMSZ), sometimes called the New Madrid fault line (or fault zone or fault system), is a major seismic zone and a prolific source of intraplate earthquakes (earthquakes within a tectonic plate) in the Southern and Midwestern United States, stretching to the southwest from New Madrid, Missouri.

The New Madrid fault system was responsible for the 1811–1812 New Madrid earthquakes and has the potential to produce large earthquakes in the future. Since 1812, frequent smaller earthquakes have been recorded in the area.

Earthquakes that occur in the New Madrid seismic zone potentially threaten parts of seven American states: Illinois, Missouri, Arkansas, Kentucky, Tennessee, and to a lesser extent Mississippi and Indiana.

== Location ==
The 150-mile-long (240 km) seismic zone, which extends into five states, stretches southward from Cairo, Illinois; through Hayti, Caruthersville, and New Madrid in Missouri; through Blytheville into Marked Tree in Arkansas. It also covers a part of West Tennessee near Reelfoot Lake, extending southeast into Dyersburg. It is southwest of the Wabash Valley seismic zone.

== Geology ==
The geological structure of Reelfoot Rift, USGS, 1996

The faults responsible for the NMSZ are embedded in a subsurface geological feature known as the Reelfoot Rift, which likely formed during the Cambrian Period. The Reelfoot Rift was first described by Ervin and McGinnis (1975) and believed to be of late Precambrian age. The rift failed to split the North American continent, but it has remained as an aulacogen (a scar or zone of weakness) deep underground.

This relative weakness is important, as it would allow the relatively small east–west compressive forces associated with the continuing westward continental drift of the North American plate to reactivate old faults around New Madrid, making the area unusually prone to earthquakes in spite of its being far from the nearest tectonic plate boundary.

Since other ancient rifts are known to occur in North America, but not all are associated with modern earthquakes, other processes could be at work to locally increase mechanical stress on the New Madrid faults. Some form of heating in the lithosphere below the area has been suggested to be making deep rocks more plastic, which would concentrate compressive stress in the shallower subsurface area where the faulting occurs.

== History ==
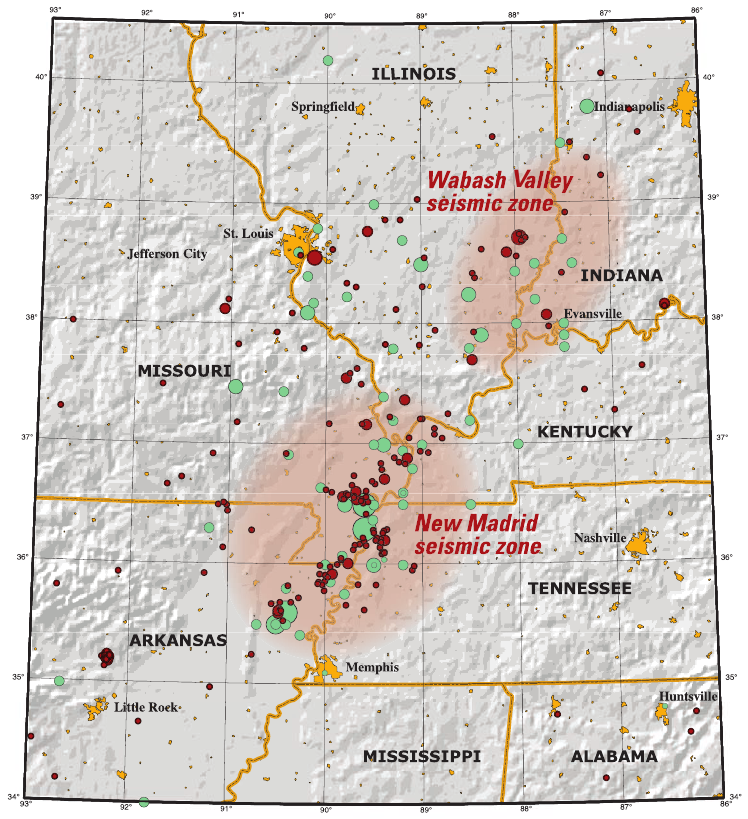
Earthquakes in the New Madrid and Wabash Valley seismic zones from 1974 to 2002, with magnitudes larger than 2.5

The zone had four of the largest earthquakes in recorded North American history, with moment magnitudes estimated to be as large as 7 or greater, all occurring within a 3-month period between December 1811 and February 1812. Many of the published accounts describe the cumulative effects of all the earthquakes, known as the New Madrid Sequence, so finding the individual effects of each quake can be difficult. Magnitude estimates and epicenters are based on interpretations of historical accounts and may vary.

=== Prehistoric earthquakes ===
As uplift rates associated with large New Madrid earthquakes could not have occurred continuously over geological timescales without dramatically altering the local topography, studies have concluded that the seismic activity there cannot have gone on for longer than 64,000 years, making the New Madrid seismic zone a young feature, or that earthquakes and the associated uplift migrate around the area over time, or that the NMSZ has short periods of activity interspersed with long periods of dormancy.

Archaeological studies have found from studies of sand blows and soil horizons that previous series of very large earthquakes have occurred in the NMSZ in recent prehistory. Based on artifacts found buried by sand blow deposits and from carbon-14 studies, previous large earthquakes like those of 1811–12 appear to have happened around AD 1450 and 900, as well as around AD 300. Evidence has also been found for an apparent series of large earthquakes around 2350 BC.

About 80 kilometres (50 mi) southwest of the presently defined NMSZ, but close enough to be associated with the Reelfoot Rift, near Marianna, Arkansas, two sets of liquefaction features indicative of large earthquakes have been tentatively identified and dated to 3500 and 4800 BC. These features were interpreted to have been caused by groups of large earthquakes timed closely together.

Dendrochronology (tree ring) studies conducted on the oldest bald cypress trees growing in Reelfoot Lake found evidence of the 1811–12 series in the form of fractures followed by rapid growth after their inundation, whereas cores taken from old bald cypress trees in the St. Francis sunklands showed slowed growth in the half century that followed 1812. These were interpreted as clear signals of the 1811–12 earthquake series in tree rings. As the tree ring record in Reelfoot Lake and the St. Francis sunk lands extend back to 1682 and 1321, respectively, Van Arsdale et al. interpret the lack of similar signals elsewhere in the chronology as evidence against large New Madrid earthquakes between those years and 1811.

=== December 25, 1699 ===
The first known written record of an earthquake felt in the NMSZ was from a French missionary traveling up the Mississippi with a party of explorers. At 1 pm on Christmas Day 1699, at a site near the present-day location of Memphis, the party was startled by a short period of ground shaking.

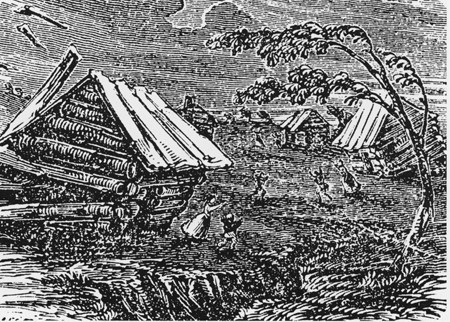
The Great Earthquake at New Madrid, a 19th-century woodcut from Devens' Our First Century (1877)

=== 1811–12 earthquake series ===
- December 16, 1811, 0815 UTC (2:15 am); (M about 7.5) epicenter in northeast Arkansas, probably on the Cottonwood Grove fault; it caused only slight damage to man-made structures, mainly due to the sparse population in the epicentral area. The future location of Memphis, Tennessee, was shaken at Mercalli level IX intensity. A seismic seiche propagated upriver, and Little Prairie was destroyed by liquefaction. Local uplifts of the ground and the sight of water waves moving upstream gave observers the impression that the Mississippi River was flowing backwards.

At New Madrid, trees were knocked down and riverbanks collapsed. This event shook windows and furniture in Washington, DC, rang bells in Richmond, Virginia, sloshed well water and shook houses in Charleston, South Carolina, and knocked plaster off of houses in Columbia, South Carolina. In Jefferson, Indiana, furniture moved, and in Lebanon, Ohio, residents fled their homes. Observers in Herculaneum, Missouri, called it "severe" and said it had a duration of 10–12 minutes.
Aftershocks were felt every 6–10 minutes, a total of 27, in New Madrid until what was called the Daylight Shock, which was of the same intensity as the first. Many of these were also felt throughout the eastern US, though with less intensity than the initial earthquake.

- December 16, 1811, sometimes termed the "Dawn Shock" or "Daylight Shock", occurred at 1315 UTC (7:15 am); (M about 7) with the epicenter in northeast Arkansas.
- January 23, 1812, 1515 UTC (9:15 am); (M about 7.3) epicenter around New Madrid, although this is disputed. This was probably the smallest of the three main shocks but resulted in widespread ground deformation, landslides, fissuring, and stream-bank caving in the meizoseismal area. Johnston and Schweig attribute this earthquake to a rupture on the New Madrid North Fault. A minority viewpoint holds that this earthquake's epicenter was in southern Illinois. A 2011 expert panel urged further research to clarify this point, stating that the Illinois hypothesis would mean that an extended section of fault exists, perhaps still loaded and capable of hosting a great earthquake in the future.
- February 7, 1812, 0945 UTC (3:45 am); (M about 7.5) epicenter near New Madrid, Missouri. This was the largest event in the series, and it destroyed the town of New Madrid. At St. Louis, Missouri, many houses were severely damaged, and their chimneys were toppled. It appears to have occurred on Reelfoot fault, a reverse fault segment that crosses under the Mississippi River just south of Kentucky Bend and continues to the east as the Lake County Uplift. In this event, uplift along the fault created temporary waterfalls on the Mississippi River, created a wave that propagated upstream, and caused the formation of Reelfoot Lake by damming streams.

A map of more than 4,000 earthquakes in the area since 1974

=== 1812–1900 ===
Hundreds of aftershocks of the 1811–12 series followed over a period of several years. Aftershocks strong enough to be felt occurred until 1817. The largest earthquakes to have occurred since then were on January 4, 1843, and October 31, 1895, with magnitude estimates of 6.0 and 6.6, respectively. The 1895 event had its epicenter near Charleston, Missouri. The quake damaged virtually all the buildings in Charleston, created sand blows by the city, cracked a pier on the Cairo Rail Bridge, and toppled chimneys in St. Louis, Missouri; Memphis, Tennessee; Gadsden, Alabama; and Evansville, Indiana.

=== Modern activity ===
The largest NMSZ earthquake of the 20th century was a 5.4-magnitude quake on November 9, 1968, near Dale, Illinois. The quake damaged the civic building at Henderson, Kentucky, and was felt in 23 states. People in Boston said their buildings swayed. At the time of the quake, it was the biggest recorded quake with an epicenter in Illinois in that state's recorded history. In 2008 in the nearby Wabash Valley seismic zone, a similar magnitude 5.4 earthquake occurred with its epicenter in Illinois near West Salem and Mount Carmel.

Instruments were installed in and around the area in 1974 to closely monitor seismic activity. Since then, more than 4,000 earthquakes have been recorded, most of which were too small to be felt. On average, one earthquake per year is large enough to be felt in the area.

=== Potential for future earthquakes ===
In a report filed in November 2008, the U.S. Federal Emergency Management Agency warns that a serious earthquake in the NMSZ could result in "the highest economic losses due to a natural disaster in the United States," further predicting "widespread and catastrophic" damage across Alabama, Arkansas, Illinois, Indiana, Kansas, Kentucky, Mississippi, Missouri, Oklahoma, Texas, and particularly Tennessee, where a 7.7 magnitude quake would cause damage to tens of thousands of structures affecting water distribution, transportation systems, and other vital infrastructure. The earthquake is expected to result in many thousands of fatalities, with more than 4,000 of the fatalities expected in Memphis alone.

The potential for the recurrence of large earthquakes and their effects on densely populated cities in and around the seismic zone has generated much research devoted to understanding the NMSZ. By studying evidence of past quakes and closely monitoring ground motion and current earthquake activity, scientists attempt to understand their causes and recurrence intervals.

In October 2009, a team composed of University of Illinois and Virginia Tech researchers headed by Amr S. Elnashai, funded by the Federal Emergency Management Agency, considered a scenario where all three segments of the New Madrid fault ruptured simultaneously with a total earthquake magnitude of 7.7. The report found that there would be significant damage in the eight states studied – Alabama, Arkansas, Illinois, Indiana, Kentucky, Mississippi, Missouri, and Tennessee – with the probability of additional damage in states farther from the NMSZ. Tennessee, Arkansas, and Missouri would be most severely impacted, and Memphis and St. Louis would be severely damaged. The report estimated 86,000 casualties, including 3,500 fatalities, 715,000 damaged buildings, and 7.2 million people displaced, with two million of those seeking shelter, primarily due to the lack of utility services. Direct economic losses, according to the report, would be at least $300 billion.

=== Iben Browning's 1990 prediction ===
Beginning in February 1989, self-proclaimed climatologist Iben Browning, who claimed to have predicted the 1980 eruption of Mount St. Helens and the 1989 Loma Prieta earthquake – predicted a 50% probability of a magnitude 6.5 to 7.5 earthquake in the New Madrid area sometime between December 1 and December 5, 1990. Browning appears to have based this prediction on particularly strong tidal forces being expected during that time, and his opinion that a New Madrid earthquake was "overdue;" however, seismologists generally agree that no correlation exists between tides and earthquakes.

The United States Geological Survey (USGS) requested an evaluation of the prediction by an advisory board of earth scientists, who concluded, "the prediction does not have scientific validity." Despite the lack of scientific support, Browning's prediction was widely reported in international media, causing public alarm. The period passed with no major earthquake activity in New Madrid or along the 120-mile (190 km) fault line.

=== Uncertainty over recurrence potential ===
The lack of apparent land movement along the New Madrid fault system has long puzzled scientists. In 2009, two studies based on eight years of GPS measurements indicated that the faults were moving at no more than 0.2 mm (0.008 in.) per year. This contrasts to the rate of slip on the San Andreas Fault, which averages up to 37 mm (1.5 in) per year across California.

On March 13, 2009, a research group based out of Northwestern University and Purdue University, funded by the USGS, reported in Science and other journals that the New Madrid system may be "shutting down" and that tectonic stress may be accumulating elsewhere. Seth Stein, the leader of the research group, published these views in a book, Disaster Deferred, in 2008. Although some of these ideas have gained some acceptance among researchers, they have not been accepted by the National Earthquake Prediction Evaluation Council, which advises the USGS. In the November 5, 2009, issue of Nature, researchers from Northwestern University and the University of Missouri said that due to the lack of fault movement, the quakes along the faults may only be aftershocks of the 1811–12 earthquakes.

According to the USGS, a broad consensus exists that the possibility of major earthquakes in the NMSZ remains a concern, and that the GPS data do not provide a compelling case for lessening perceived earthquake hazards in the region. One concern is that the small earthquakes that still happen are not diminishing over time, as would be if they were aftershocks of the 1811–12 events; another is that the 4,500-year archaeological record of large earthquakes in the region is more significant than 10 years of direct strain measurement. The USGS issued a fact sheet in 2009 stating the estimate of a 7–10% chance of a New Madrid earthquake of magnitude comparable to one of the 1811–12 quakes within the next 50 years, and a 25–40% chance of a magnitude 6 earthquake in the same time frame. In July 2014, the USGS increased the risk assessment for the New Madrid area.

== See also ==
- Crowley's Ridge – Geological formation in Arkansas and Missouri, U.S.
- Earthquake prediction – Branch of geophysics, primarily seismology
- Eastern Tennessee seismic zone – Active earthquake zone in the eastern U.S.
- Guy-Greenbrier earthquake swarm – Earthquake swarm in Arkansas, United States
- Marianna Fault – Fault in eastern Arkansas
