= Intraplate earthquake =

Earthquake that occurs within the interior of a tectonic plate

Distribution of seismicity associated with the New Madrid seismic zone (since 1974). This zone of intense earthquake activity is located deep within the interior of the North American plate.

An intraplate earthquake is an earthquake which occurs in the interior of a tectonic plate. They are relatively rare compared to the more familiar interplate earthquakes, which occur on the boundaries of tectonic plates. An earthquake that occurs within a subducting plate is known as an intraslab earthquake.

Because buildings far from plate boundaries are rarely protected with seismic retrofitting, large intraplate earthquakes can inflict heavy damage. Examples of damaging intraplate earthquakes are the devastating 2001 Gujarat earthquake, the 2011 Christchurch earthquake, the 2012 Indian Ocean earthquakes, the 2017 Puebla earthquake, the 1811–1812 New Madrid earthquakes, and the 1886 Charleston earthquake.

== Description ==
The Earth's crust is made up of seven primary and eight secondary tectonic plates, plus dozens of tertiary microplates. The large plates move very slowly on top of convection currents in the underlying mantle. Because they do not all move in the same direction, plates often directly collide or slide laterally along each other, a tectonic environment that makes interplate earthquakes frequent.

By contrast, relatively few earthquakes occur in intraplate environments away from plate junctures. These earthquakes often occur at the location of ancient failed rifts, partial fractures of existing plates, because they may leave a weakness in the crust vulnerable to regional tectonic strain.

Intraslab earthquakes radiate more seismic energy than interplate earthquakes (megathrust earthquakes) of a similar magnitude. This variation makes seismic energy a better measure for the potential macroseismic effects of an earthquake than the more common seismic moment used to calculate the magnitude M_{w}.

== Examples ==
Examples of intraplate earthquakes include those in Mineral, Virginia, in 2011 (estimated magnitude 5.8), Newcastle, New South Wales in 1989, New Madrid in 1811 and 1812 (estimated magnitude as high as 8.6), the Boston (Cape Ann) earthquake of 1755 (estimated magnitude 6.0 to 6.3), earthquakes felt in New York City in 1737 and 1884 (both quakes estimated at 5.5 magnitude), and the Charleston earthquake in South Carolina in 1886 (estimated magnitude 6.5 to 7.3). The Charleston quake was particularly surprising because, unlike Boston and New York, the area had almost no history of even minor earthquakes.

In 2001, a large intraplate earthquake devastated the region of Gujarat, India. The earthquake occurred far from any plate boundaries, which meant the region above the epicenter was unprepared for earthquakes. In particular, the Kutch district suffered tremendous damage, where the death toll was over 12,000 and the total death toll was higher than 20,000.

In 2017, the 24–29 km deep magnitude 6.5 Botswana earthquake that shook eastern Botswana occurred at over 300 km from the nearest active plate boundary. The event occurred in an underpopulated area of Botswana.

The 1888 earthquake in Río de la Plata was an intraplate quake, from reactivated faults in the Quilmes Trough, far from the boundaries of the South American plate. With a magnitude greater than 5.0 it was felt "in the cities of Buenos Aires, La Plata and other small towns and villages along the Rio de Plata coastal regions." The towns of Punta del Este and Maldonado in Uruguay were hit by a tsunami generated by the quake.

== Causes ==
Many cities live with the seismic risk of a rare, large intraplate earthquake. The cause of these earthquakes is often uncertain. In many cases, the causative fault is deeply buried and sometimes cannot even be found. Some studies have shown that quakes can be caused by fluids moving up the crust along ancient fault zones. In such circumstances, it is difficult to estimate the seismic hazard for a given city, especially if there was only one earthquake in historical times. Some progress is being made in understanding the fault mechanics driving these earthquakes.

Intraplate earthquakes may be unrelated to ancient fault zones and instead caused by deglaciation or erosion.

== Prediction ==
Scientists continue to search for the causes of these earthquakes, and especially for some indication of how often they recur. The best success has come with detailed micro-seismic monitoring, involving dense arrays of seismometers. In this manner, very small earthquakes associated with a causative fault can be located with great accuracy, and in most cases these line up in patterns consistent with faulting. Cryoseisms can sometimes be mistaken for intraplate earthquakes.

== Intraslab earthquake ==
In seismology, an intraslab earthquake occurs within a subducting plate, known as slabs. They are most frequent in older slabs which are colder, whereas younger slabs that are warmer rarely produce earthquakes. They can be detected within these slabs at depths exceeding 500 km (310 mi); they are also the source of intermediate and deep-focus earthquakes. Intraslab earthquakes at depths 20–60 km (12–37 mi) are considered shallow earthquakes and can be destructive to cities. One of the deadliest earthquakes of the 20th century was the 1970 Ancash earthquake, measuring M_{w} 7.9 and occurring off the coast of Peru. The 2001 Nisqually and 1949 Olympia earthquakes were also intraslab events.

== See also ==
- New Madrid seismic zone – Major seismic zone in the southern and midwestern United States
- Wabash Valley seismic zone – Tectonic region in the Midwestern United States
- Saint Lawrence rift system – Seismically active zone paralleling the Saint Lawrence River
