= Isoseismal map =

Type of map used in seismology

Isoseismal map for the 1968 Illinois earthquake

In seismology, an isoseismal map is used to show countour lines of equally felt seismic intensity, generally measured on the Modified Mercalli scale. The contour lines in an iseoseismal map are called isoseismal lines. Such maps help to identify earthquake epicenters, particularly where no instrumental records exist, such as for historical earthquakes. They also contain important information on ground conditions at particular locations, the underlying geology, radiation pattern of the seismic waves, and the response of different types of buildings. They form an important part of the macroseismic approach, i.e. that part of seismology dealing with noninstrumental data. The shape and size of the isoseismal regions can be used to help determine the magnitude, focal depth, and focal mechanism of an earthquake.

== History ==
The first known isoseismal map was produced for the 1810 earthquake in Mór in Hungary, and published by Kitaibel and Tomtsányi in 1814. The first, six-level intensity scale was proposed by Egen in 1828 for an earthquake in Rhineland. Robert Mallet coined the term "isoseismal" and produced a map for the 1857 Basilicata earthquake with a three-fold intensity scale and used this and other information to identify the epicentral area (a term he also coined). Later studies made use of similar techniques, the main changes being to the actual seismic intensity scale employed.

== Methodology ==
Firstly, observations of the felt intensity need to be obtained for all areas affected by the tremor. In the case of recent earthquakes, news reports are augmented by sending out questionnaires or by collecting information online about the intensity of the shaking. For a historical earthquake, the procedure is much the same, except that it requires searching through contemporary accounts in newspapers, letters, diaries, etc. Once the information has been assembled and intensities assigned at the location of the individual observations, these are plotted on a map. Isoseismal lines are then drawn to link together areas of equal shaking. Because of local variations in the ground conditions, isoseismals generally separate zones of broadly similar felt intensity, while containing areas of both higher and lower degrees of shaking. To make the isoseismals less subjective, attempts have been made to use computer-based methods of contouring such as kriging, rather than relying on visual interpolation. The Natural Neighbour interpolation method allows isoseismals to be drawn in an objective and reproducible way.

== Use ==
=== Locating the epicenter ===
In most earthquakes, the isoseismals define a single clear area of maximum intensity, which is known as the epicentral or meizoseismal area. In some earthquakes, more than one maximum exists because of the effect of ground conditions or complexities in the rupture propagation, and other information is, therefore, required to identify the area that contains the epicenter.

=== Measuring the magnitude ===
The magnitude of an earthquake can be estimated by measuring the area affected by intensity level III or above in km^{2} and taking the logarithm. A more accurate estimate relies on the development of regional calibration functions derived using many isoseismal radii. Such approaches allow magnitudes to be estimated for historical earthquakes.

=== Estimating the focal depth ===
The depth to the hypocenter can be estimated by comparing the sizes of different isoseismal areas. In shallow earthquakes, the lines are close together, while in deep events the lines are spread further apart.

=== Confirming the focal mechanism ===
Focal mechanisms are routinely calculated using teleseismic data, but an ambiguity remains as two potential fault planes always are possible. The shape of the areas of highest intensity are generally elongated along the direction of the active fault plane.

=== Testing seismic hazard assessments ===
Because of the relatively long history of macroseismic intensity observations (sometimes stretching back many centuries in some regions), isoseismal maps can be used to test seismic hazard assessments by comparing the expected temporal frequency of different levels of intensity, assuming an assessment is true and the observed rate of exceedance.
