= 1895 Charleston earthquake =

Earthquake affecting the Midwestern United States

- Location within the United States
- UTC time: 1895-10-31 11:08:00
- USGS-ANSS: ComCat
- Local date: October 31, 1895
- Local time: 05:07 CST
- Magnitude: 5.8–6.6 M_{w}
- Epicenter: 36.9°N 89.3°W
- Areas affected: United States
- Max. intensity: MMI VIII (Severe)
- Casualties: 2 fatalities, 7 injured

The 1895 Charleston earthquake, also known as the Halloween earthquake, occurred on October 31, at 05:07 CST near Charleston, Missouri. It had an estimated moment magnitude of 5.8–6.6 and evaluated Modified Mercalli intensity of VIII (Severe). The earthquake caused substantial property damage in the states of Missouri, Illinois, Ohio, Alabama, Iowa, Kentucky, Indiana, and Tennessee. Shaking was widespread, being felt across 23 states and even in Canada. At least two people died and seven were injured.

== Tectonic setting ==
The New Madrid seismic zone located in the midcontinental United States is a region of concentrated seismic activity. This zone is within the Reelfoot Rift, a failed rift trending northeast. Faulting within the rift occasionally causes small to moderate earthquakes. In 1811–1812, a series of large earthquakes occurred on the rift, causing great devastation.

Martin and Hough postulated three different plausible events, a north-northwest rupture from Henson Lake to Charleston, a northeast rupture on the western boundary faults of the Reelfoot Rift, or north-northeast or north-northwest rupture within the rift. They concluded that the third event was most consistent with reports of the macroseismic effects, but not with liquefaction reports. It was also possible that the rupture involved more than one fault. Inferred aftershock locations suggest compatibility with the latter model, and agrees with the intensity distribution which suggest a northeast-propagating rupture. All three models indicate the earthquake was a buried rupture event along a 5–20 km (3.1–12.4 mi) fault.

== Earthquake ==
An isoseismal map of the earthquake showing the felt area with varying intensities of shaking across the Midwest.

The earthquake had an epicenter near Charleston, an inference made from on reports of soil liquefaction and strong shaking in the city. Extensive documentation of its macroseismic effects were used by researchers to determine its magnitude. Most existing scientific journals agree that the magnitude was about magnitude 6.0 or larger. A 1996 paper estimated the magnitude to be 6.6 M_{w} based on studying the intensity distribution. Recently (2019), seismologists Martin and Hough estimated the magnitude to be 5.8 M_{w}. An article published under Engineering Geology re-estimated the moment magnitude based on the Modified Mercalli intensity distribution and yielded 6.7.

No foreshock activity preceded the mainshock, and there is limited documentation of the aftershocks. At Elwood, Indiana, a three-second local shock was felt on October 31, at 07:15. There were no reports of this shock being felt outside the city. One newspaper account stated that the ground "continued to vibrate for fully twenty minutes". In Cairo, Illinois, an aftershock was reported 15 minutes after the mainshock and may have been felt in Memphis, Tennessee; Hickman, Kentucky; and Hammond, Indiana. Additional aftershocks were felt on November 1 and December 31.

== Impact ==
In Bardwell, Kentucky, an elderly man was "scared to death", while in Avery, Iowa, a worker was killed by falling slate at a mine. An explosion due to a ruptured gas pipe in Cincinnati, Ohio injured seven people. In Reelfoot Lake, thousands of "stunned or dead" fishes floated at the surface.

The earthquake is considered the largest and most destructive in the area since 1812. Building damage and liquefaction was observed along a linear path from Bertrand (in Missouri) to Cairo. Sand volcanoes were observed in some areas north and south of Charleston. Charleston experienced extensive damage; collapsed chimneys, broken windows and plasters occurred on schools, homes, churches and commercial buildings across the town. At Cairo, chimneys and windows of most buildings were destroyed. The town courthouse, library, and a church was seriously damaged. Many buildings large cracks to its brick walls. A pier on the Ohio River was cracked.

In Chicago, Illinois, all 12,000 telephone exchange were activated simultaneously. Many residents were awakened by rattling windows, although there was minimal damage. At St. Louis, Missouri, frightened residents rushed out of their homes. There was relatively little damage to old masonry buildings. Two chimneys in Memphis, Tennessee toppled during the shaking. Light shaking was felt at McKeesport and Bellevue, Pennsylvania. Buildings as far away as Indianapolis and Kansas City shook, awakening residents.

== See also ==
- List of historical earthquakes
- List of earthquakes in the United States
- List of earthquakes in Illinois
