= Wabash Valley seismic zone =

Tectonic region in the Midwestern United States

Coordinates: 38°43′N 87°41′W

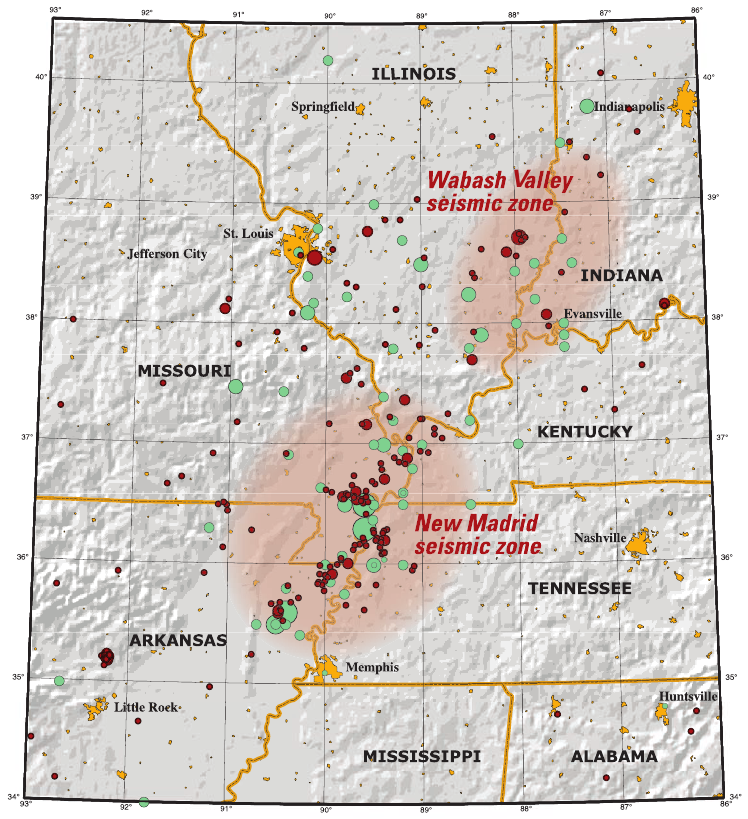
Locations of quakes magnitude 2.5 or greater in the Wabash Valley (upper right) and New Madrid (lower left) Seismic Zones

The Wabash Valley seismic zone (also known as the Wabash Valley fault system or fault zone) is a tectonic region located in the Midwestern United States, centered on the valley of the lower Wabash River, along the state line between southeastern Illinois and southwestern Indiana.

== Geology ==
The Wabash Valley seismic zone consists largely of vertically oriented ("normal") faults deeply buried under layers of sediment. Although the tectonics of the region are not fully understood and are the subject of ongoing research, these faults are thought by some to be associated with a branch of the New Madrid aulacogen, an old rift zone where the lithosphere actively began to pull apart at perhaps two separate times in the distant past.

Present-day GPS measurements show that the region deforms at about 1–2 mm per year with compression along the Wabash Valley fault zone and extension in southwestern Indiana. The crust in the area has been weakened by the numerous faults, which remain active sites for continuing seismic activity as the motion of the North American plate exerts both compressional and tensional forces.

== Earthquakes ==
This zone has been proven to have had earthquakes for the last 20,000 years, with geologic evidence that they may have been as strong as 7.0–7.5 or greater on the Richter scale.

According to the United States Geological Survey, lesser earthquakes occur relatively frequently, but those at a magnitude less than 3.5 or so are usually not felt. Ones strong enough to be felt usually happen once or twice per year, and those large enough to cause moderate damage have occurred every decade or so. Quakes in this region can be felt in a much wider range than those in other zones such as California.

The concern of seismologists Douglas Wiens and Michael E. Wysession of Washington University in St. Louis is that the New Madrid Fault may be becoming less active, while activity on the Wabash Fault could be increasing. Wiens states: "I think everyone's interested in the Wabash Valley Fault because a lot of the attention has been on the New Madrid Fault, but the Wabash Valley Fault could be the more dangerous one, at least for St. Louis and Illinois." "The strongest earthquakes in the last few years have come from the Wabash Valley Fault, which needs more investigation." Numerical modeling indicates that stress transfer following the 1811–1812 New Madrid earthquakes may be loading faults in the Wabash Zone.

Notable modern earthquakes in this zone include:

June 10, 1987, magnitude 5.0
The earthquake was located close to Lawrenceville, Illinois.
June 18, 2002, magnitude 4.6
The earthquake was located close to Evansville, Indiana, with an epicenter between Darmstadt and Cynthiana in Posey County. Minor damage was associated with the earthquake.
April 18, 2008, magnitude 5.4
The initial magnitude 5.4 quake was followed by a 4.6 aftershock six hours later, followed by a 4.0 aftershock 3 days later. Its epicenter was located about 41 miles (66 km) north-northwest of Evansville, Indiana, near the Illinois communities of West Salem, Mount Carmel, and Bellmont. The quake was felt as far away as Kansas City, Atlanta, and Canada. Some minor damage was reported near the epicenter.

June 17, 2021, magnitude 3.8
Epicenter was 3 km west of Bloomingdale, Parke County, Indiana, and was felt as far away as Peoria, Illinois and northern Indiana. No damage was reported.

January 20, 2026, magnitude 3.8
Epicenter was 4 km northwest of Ohlman, Illinois and was felt throughout Central and Southern Illinois along with the St. Louis area.
