= Bellmont, Illinois =

- Village
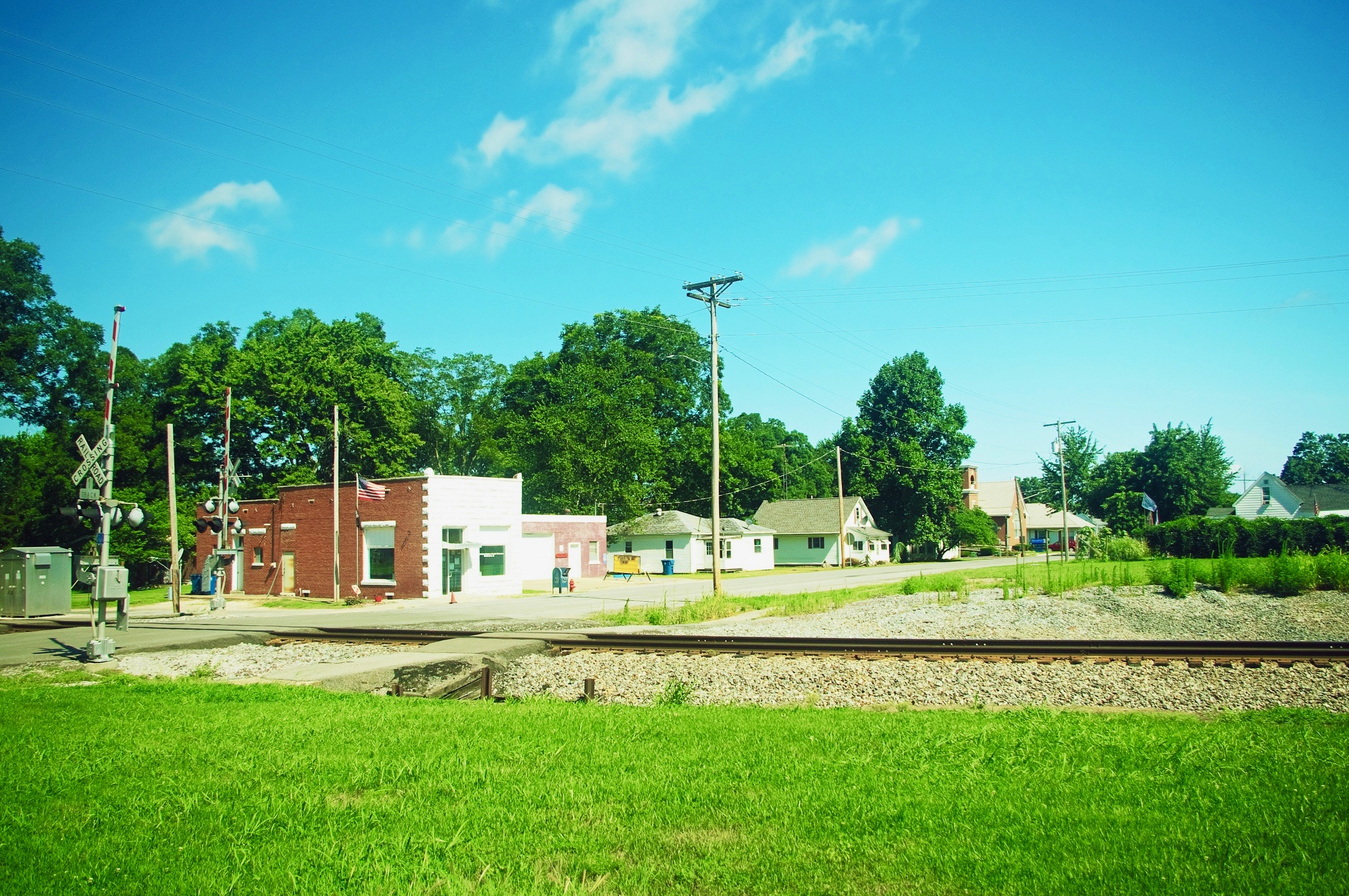
- Main Street

- Location of Bellmont in Wabash County, Illinois.
- Coordinates: 38°22′59″N 87°54′38″W
- Country: United States
- State: Illinois
- County: Wabash
- Precinct: Bellmont

Area
  - Total: 0.32 sq mi (0.84 km^{2})
  - Land: 0.32 sq mi (0.84 km^{2})
  - Water: 0 sq mi (0.00 km^{2})
- Elevation: 436 ft (133 m)

Population (2020)
  - Total: 247
  - Density: 759.7/sq mi (293.31/km^{2})
- Time zone: UTC-6 (CST)
  - Summer (DST): UTC-5 (CDT)
- ZIP code: 62811
- Area code: 618
- FIPS code: 17-04936
- GNIS feature ID: 2398082

Bellmont is a village in Bellmont Precinct, Wabash County, Illinois, United States. The population was 247 at the 2020 census.

== History ==
Bellmont is named for Judge Robert S. Bell (1828–1906), who served as a county judge for Wabash during the 1870s.

== Geography ==
According to the 2010 census, Bellmont has a total area of 0.32 square miles (0.83 km^{2}), all land. The village is connected to nearby Albion and Mount Carmel by Illinois Route 15.

== Demographics ==
Historical population
Census	Pop.	Note	%±
1880	350		—
1890	487		39.1%
1900	624		28.1%
1910	550		−11.9%
1920	464		−15.6%
1930	407		−12.3%
1940	408		0.2%
1950	368		−9.8%
1960	320		−13.0%
1970	292		−8.7%
1980	307		5.1%
1990	271		−11.7%
2000	297		9.6%
2010	276		−7.1%
2020	247		−10.5%
U.S. Decennial Census

As of the census of 2000, there were 297 people, 123 households, and 84 families residing in the village. The population density was 813.9 inhabitants per square mile (314.2/km^{2}). There were 140 housing units at an average density of 383.7 per square mile (148.1/km^{2}). The racial makeup of the village was 97.98% White, 0.34% African American, 0.34% Asian, and 1.35% from two or more races. Hispanic or Latino of any race were 0.67% of the population.

There were 123 households, out of which 36.6% had children under the age of 18 living with them, 55.3% were married couples living together, 10.6% had a female householder with no husband present, and 31.7% were non-families. 30.1% of all households were made up of individuals, and 12.2% had someone living alone who was 65 years of age or older. The average household size was 2.41 and the average family size was 2.99.

In the village, the population was spread out, with 26.9% under the age of 18, 9.4% from 18 to 24, 30.6% from 25 to 44, 19.9% from 45 to 64, and 13.1% who were 65 years of age or older. The median age was 36 years. For every 100 females there were 106.3 males. For every 100 females age 18 and over, there were 95.5 males.

The median income for a household in the village was $30,000, and the median income for a family was $33,906. Males had a median income of $25,417 versus $17,000 for females. The per capita income for the village was $14,263. About 15.1% of families and 11.9% of the population were below the poverty line, including 13.9% of those under the age of eighteen and 17.1% of those 65 or over.

== See also ==
- 2008 Illinois earthquake
