= 1811–1812 New Madrid earthquakes =

Series of earthquakes during 1811–1812 impacting on Missouri, USA

Coordinates: 36.4°N 89.6°W

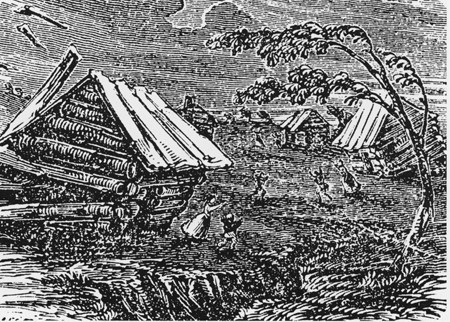
- 1877 artist's impression of the 1811 New Madrid earthquake in a woodcut illustration for the book Our First Century by R.M. Devens.

- Location within Missouri Location within Tennessee Location within the United States
- UTC time: 1811-12-16 08:15:00; 1811-12-16 13:15:00; 1812-01-23 15:15:00; 1812-02-07 09:45:00
- ISC event
- USGS-ANSS: ComCat; ComCat; ComCat; ComCat
- Local date: December 16, 1811; December 16, 1811; January 23, 1812; February 7, 1812
- Local time: 02:15; 07:15; 09:15; 03:45
- Magnitude: M_{w} 7.5; M_{w} 7.0; M_{w} 7.3; M_{w} 7.5
- Max. intensity: MMI XII (Extreme)
- Aftershocks: M_{w} 6.3, 6.3, 6.1 & 6.3
- Casualties: Unknown

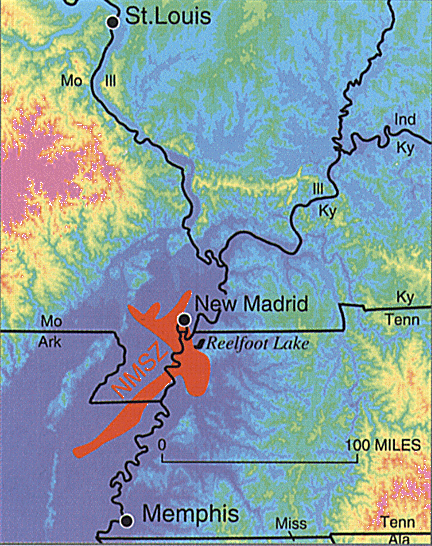
New Madrid fault and earthquake-prone region considered at high risk today

The 1811–1812 New Madrid earthquakes were a series of intense intraplate earthquakes beginning with an initial earthquake of moment magnitude 7.2–8.2 on December 16, 1811, followed by a moment magnitude 7.4 aftershock on the same day. Two additional earthquakes of similar magnitude followed in January and February 1812. They remain the most powerful earthquakes to hit the contiguous United States east of the Rocky Mountains in recorded history. The earthquakes, as well as the seismic zone of their occurrence, were named for the Mississippi River town of New Madrid, then part of the Louisiana Territory and now within the U.S. state of Missouri.

The epicenters of the earthquakes were located in an area that at the time was at the distant western edge of the American frontier, only sparsely settled by European settlers. Contemporary accounts have led seismologists to estimate that these stable continental region earthquakes were felt strongly throughout much of the central and eastern United States, across an area of roughly 50,000 square miles (130,000 km^{2}), and moderately across nearly 1 million sq mi (3 million km^{2}). The 1906 San Francisco earthquake, by comparison, was felt moderately over roughly 6,200 sq mi (16,000 km^{2}). The earthquakes were interpreted by Tecumseh's pan-Indian alliance to mean that Tecumseh and his brother the Prophet must be supported.

== Events ==
- December 16, 1811, 08:15 UTC (02:15 am local time): M 7.2–8.2, epicenter in what is now northeast Arkansas. It caused only slight damage to man-made structures, mainly because of the sparse population in the epicentral area. The future location of Memphis, Tennessee, experienced level IX shaking on the Mercalli intensity scale. A seismic seiche propagated upriver, and Little Prairie (a village that was on the site of the former Fort San Fernando, near the site of present-day Caruthersville, Missouri) was heavily damaged by soil liquefaction. Modified Mercalli intensity VII or greater was observed over a 600,000 km^{2} (230,000 sq mi) area.
- December 16, 1811 (aftershock), 13:15 UTC (07:15 am local time): M 7.4, epicenter in southeast Missouri. This shock followed the first earthquake by six hours and was similar in intensity.
- January 23, 1812, 15:15 UTC (09:15 am local time): M 7.0–8.0, epicenter in the Missouri Bootheel. The meizoseismal area was characterized by general ground warping, ejections, fissuring, severe landslides, and caving of stream banks. Johnston and Schweig attributed this earthquake to a rupture on the New Madrid North Fault. This may have placed strain on the Reelfoot Fault.
- February 7, 1812, 09:45 UTC (03:45 am local time): M 7.4–8.6, epicenter near New Madrid, Missouri. The town of New Madrid was destroyed. In St. Louis, Missouri, many houses were severely damaged and their chimneys were toppled. This shock was definitively attributed to the Reelfoot Fault by Johnston and Schweig. Uplift along a segment of this reverse fault created temporary waterfalls on the Mississippi at Kentucky Bend, created waves that propagated upstream, and caused the formation of Reelfoot Lake by obstructing streams in what is now Lake County, Tennessee. The maximum Modified Mercalli intensity observed was XII.

New Madrid earthquake sequence, USGS catalog (1811–1812)
Date	Time (UTC)	Magnitude M_{w}	Location	Ref.
December 16	08:15:00	7.5	Northeast Arkansas	
December 16	09:00:00	6.3	Near New Madrid, Missouri	
December 16	13:15:00	7.0	Western Tennessee	
December 16	18:00:00	6.3	Near New Madrid, Missouri	
December 17	18:00:00	6.1	Near Memphis, Tennessee	
January 23	15:00:00	7.3	North of New Madrid, Missouri	
February 7	09:45:00	7.5	Western Tennessee	
November 9	22:00:00	4.0	New Madrid, Missouri area	

=== Eyewitness accounts ===
John Bradbury, a fellow of the Linnean Society, was on the Mississippi on the night of December 15, 1811, and describes the tremors in great detail in his Travels in the Interior of America in the Years 1809, 1810 and 1811, published in 1817:

After supper, we went to sleep as usual: about ten o'clock, and in the night I was awakened by the most tremendous noise, accompanied by an agitation of the boat so violent, that it appeared in danger of upsetting ... I could distinctly see the river as if agitated by a storm; and although the noise was inconceivably loud and terrific, I could distinctly hear the crash of falling trees, and the screaming of the wild fowl on the river, but found that the boat was still safe at her moorings. By the time we could get to our fire, which was on a large flag in the stern of the boat, the shock had ceased; but immediately the perpendicular banks, both above and below us, began to fall into the river in such vast masses, as nearly to sink our boat by the swell they occasioned ... At day-light we had counted twenty-seven shocks.

Eliza Bryan in New Madrid, Missouri Territory, wrote the following eyewitness account in March 1812:

On the 16th of December 1811, about two o'clock, a.m., we were visited by a violent shock of an earthquake, accompanied by a very awful noise resembling loud but distant thunder, but more hoarse and vibrating, which was followed in a few minutes by the complete saturation of the atmosphere, with sulphurious vapor, causing total darkness. The screams of the affrighted inhabitants running to and fro, not knowing where to go, or what to do—the cries of the fowls and beasts of every species—the cracking of trees falling, and the roaring of the Mississippi— the current of which was retrograde for a few minutes, owing as is supposed, to an irruption in its bed— formed a scene truly horrible.

John Reynolds, the fourth governor of Illinois, among other political posts, mentions the earthquake in his biography My Own Times: Embracing Also the History of My Life (1855):

On the night of the 15th of December 1811, an earthquake occurred, that produced great consternation amongst the people. The centre of the violence was in New Madrid, Missouri, but the whole valley of the Mississippi was violently agitated. Our family all were sleeping in a log cabin, and my father leaped out of bed crying aloud "the Indians are on the house" ... We laughed at the mistake of my father, but soon found out it was worse than the Indians. Not one in the family knew at the time that it was an earthquake. The next morning another shock made us acquainted with it, so we decided it was an earthquake. The cattle came running home bellowing with fear, and all animals were terribly alarmed on the occasion. Our house cracked and quivered, so we were fearful it would fall to the ground. In the American Bottom many chimneys were thrown down, and the church bell in Cahokia sounded by the agitation of the building. It is said the shock of an earthquake was felt in Kaskaskia in 1804, but I did not perceive it. The shocks continued for years in Illinois, and some have experienced it this year, 1855.

The Shaker diarist Samuel Swan McClelland described the effects of the earthquake on the Shaker settlement at West Union (Busro), Indiana, where the earthquakes contributed to the temporary abandonment of the westernmost Shaker community.

== Geologic setting ==
Reelfoot Rift

The underlying cause of the earthquakes is not well understood, but modern faulting seems to be related to an ancient geologic feature buried under the Mississippi River alluvial plain, known as the Reelfoot Rift. The New Madrid seismic zone is made up of reactivated faults that formed when what is now North America began to split or rift apart during the breakup of the supercontinent Rodinia in the Neoproterozoic era (about 750 million years ago). Faults were created along the rift, and igneous rocks formed from magma that was being pushed towards the surface. The resulting rift system failed to split the plate, but has remained as an aulacogen (a scar or weak zone) deep underground.

== Aftermath ==
The quakes caused extensive changes to the region's topography. Subsidence, uplift, fissures, landslides and riverbank collapses were common. Trees were uprooted by the intense shaking. Reelfoot Lake was formed in Tennessee by subsidence of 1.5 meters to 6 meters in some places. Lake St. Francis in eastern Arkansas was expanded by subsidence, with sand and coal being ejected from fissures in the adjacent swamps as water levels rose by 8 to 9 meters. Waves on the Mississippi River caused boats to wash ashore; river banks rose, sand bars were destroyed, and some islands completely disappeared. Sand blows occurred in Missouri, Tennessee, and Arkansas, covering farmland.

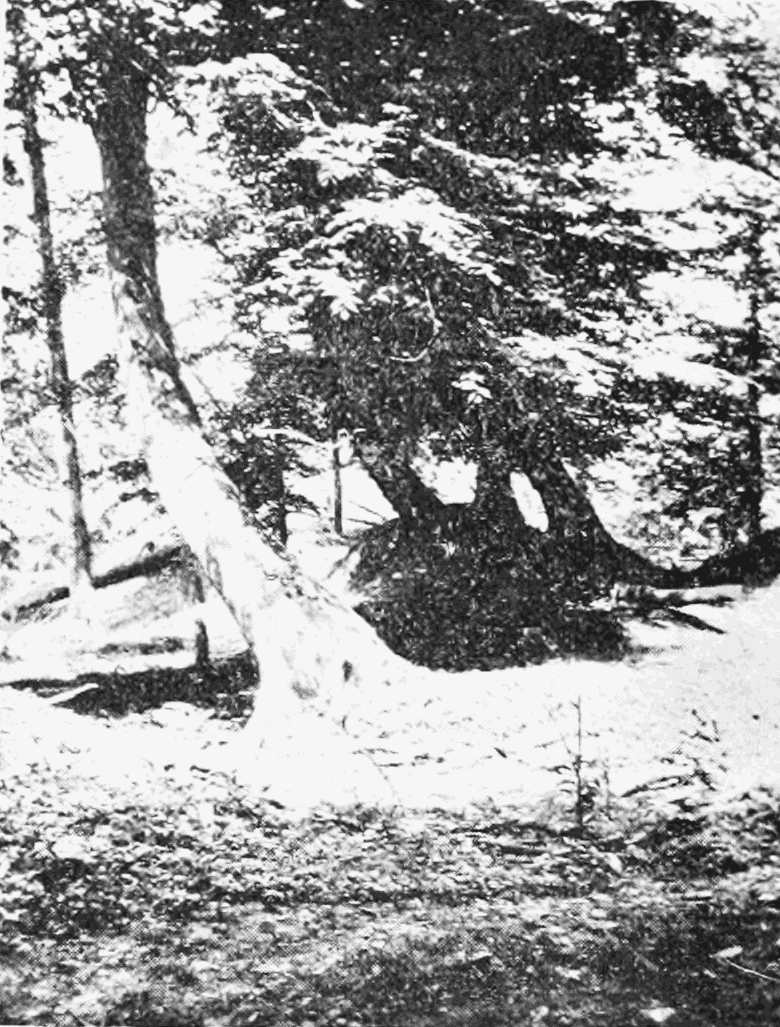
Photograph showing trees that were tilted by the New Madrid Earthquakes. Taken in 1904.

The continuous underlying rock mass, uninterrupted by fractures or faults, conducted the seismic waves from the earthquakes over great distances, with perceptible ground shaking as far away as Canada. Intense effects were widely felt in Illinois, Arkansas, Tennessee, Kentucky and Missouri.

The number of people who died is unknown; as a frontier area, the region was sparsely populated, and communications and records were poor. The predominantly wooden buildings resisted collapse, though the intense shaking caused many chimneys to fall, wood structures to crack, and trees to fall on buildings, particularly in the epicentral area during the first earthquake on December 16, 1811. Additionally, people drowned when subsided land began to flood. A Methodist chaplain traveling with Andrew Jackson on his Natchez Expedition of 1813 recorded in his journal: "The fishers [fissures] produced in the earth about Madrid look awful on both sides of the River and the earth continues to shake at times, fears are ascertained that the worst is to come, it is said that there where about one thousand inhabitants in the Town of New Madrid previous to the Earth Quake — but many alarmed went off that at this time there only about 300."

Rated at VII on the Mercalli Intensity Scale, the New Madrid earthquakes remain the strongest recorded North American earthquakes east of the Rocky Mountains. The earthquakes strengthened the Shawnee prophet Tenskwatawa after the defeat at the Battle of Tippecanoe and the destruction of Prophetstown, with local Native Americans seeing it as a vindication of his teachings and of the warnings of his brother Tecumseh. Cherokee settlements along the St. Francis River were flooded and abandoned and the Cherokee moved to the Arkansas River valley.

== Likelihood and consequence of a modern event ==
6057 earthquakes have been reported in the New Madrid seismic zone from 1974 to 2011.

In recent decades, minor earthquakes have continued. The epicenters of over 4,000 earthquakes can be identified from seismic measurements since 1974, originating from the seismic activity of the Reelfoot Rift. A United States Geological Survey (USGS) forecast made in 2003 estimated a 7–10% chance of a major earthquake like those of 1811–1812, and a 25–40% chance of a quake of magnitude 6 or greater, within the next 50 years.

In a report filed in November 2008, the U.S. Federal Emergency Management Agency warns that a serious earthquake in the New Madrid seismic zone could inflict "the highest economic losses due to a natural disaster in the United States", further predicting "widespread and catastrophic" damage across Alabama, Arkansas, Illinois, Indiana, Kentucky, Mississippi, Missouri, and particularly Tennessee, where a 7.7 or greater magnitude quake would cause damage to tens of thousands of structures affecting water distribution, transportation systems, and other vital infrastructure.

== Gallery ==
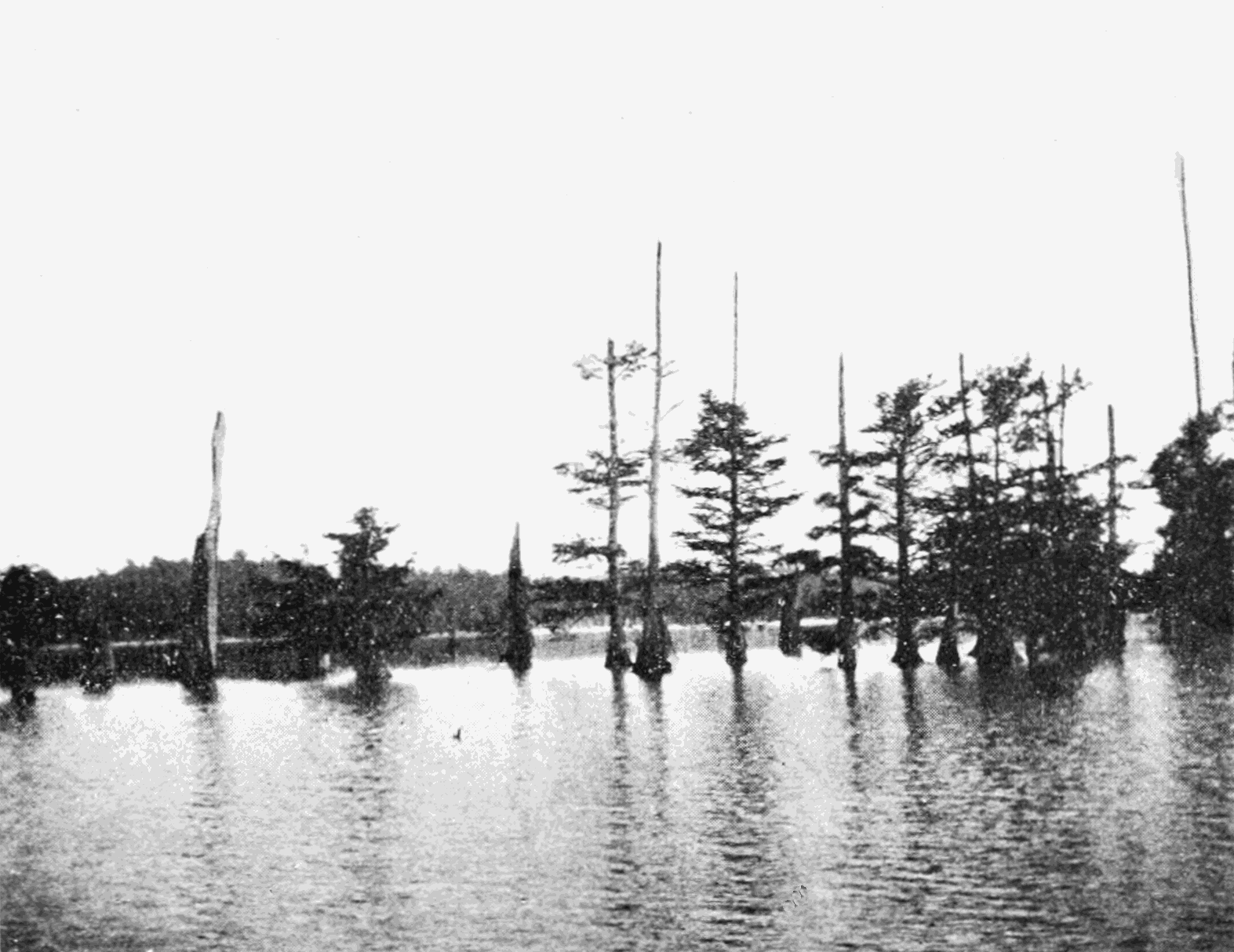
Subsidence of Reelfoot Lake in Tennessee. The subsidence was between 4.9 and 19.6 feet.

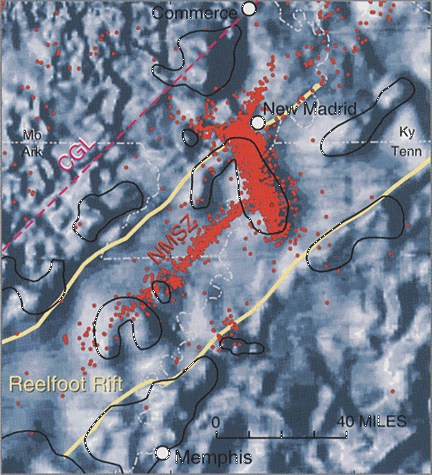
Reelfoot Rift and NMSZ

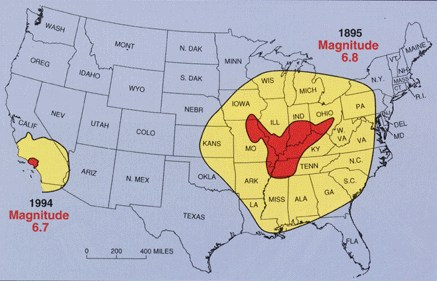
Damage-range comparison between a moderate New Madrid zone earthquake (1895, magnitude 6.8), and a similar Los Angeles event (1994, magnitude 6.7).

== See also ==
- List of earthquakes in the United States
- List of historical earthquakes
