= Dave Severin =

American politician

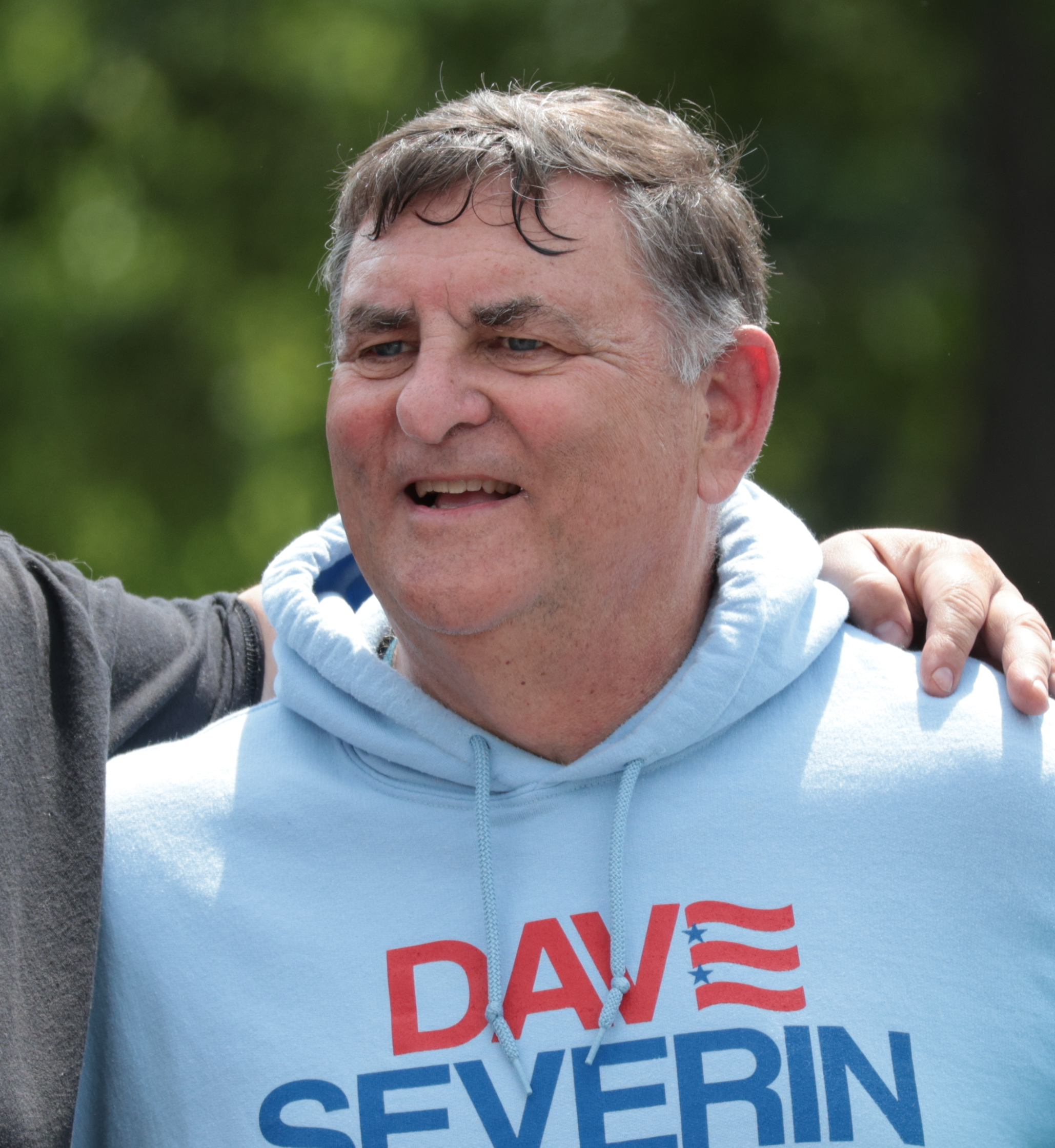
- Severin in 2026

Member of the Illinois House of Representatives from the 116th district
- Incumbent
- Assumed office January 11, 2017
- Preceded by: Jim Kirkpatrick

Personal details
- Born: Benton, Illinois, U.S.
- Party: Republican
- Spouse: Penny
- Children: 1
- Profession: Business owner

Dave Severin is a Republican member of the Illinois House of Representatives, representing the 117th district since January 2017. The 117th district, located in Southern Illinois and parts of the Metro Lakeland area, includes all or parts of Benton, Buckner, Bush, Cambria, Carbondale, Carterville, Christopher, Colp, Crab Orchard, Creal Springs, Energy, Ewing, Freeman Spur, Granville, Hanaford, Herrin, Hurst, Johnston City, Macedonia, Marion, McLeansboro, Mulkeytown, North City, Orient, Pittsburg, Royalton, Sesser, Spillertown, Stonefort, Thompsonville, Valier, West City, West Frankfort, Whiteash, and Zeigler.

A native of Benton, Illinois, he served as a member of the Benton School District #47 board of education and small business owner prior to his election to the Illinois House of Representatives.

As of July 3, 2022, Representative Severin is a member of the following Illinois House committees:

- Appropriations - Elementary & Secondary Education Committee (HAPE)
- Criminal Administration and Enforcement Committee (HJUC-CAES)
- Elementary & Secondary Education: School Curriculum & Policies (HELM)
- Firearms and Firearm Safety Subcommittee (HJUC-FIRE)
- Judiciary - Criminal Committee (HJUC)
- Juvenile Justice and System-Involved Youth Subcommittee (HJUC-JJSI)
- Mental Health & Addiction Committee (HMEH)
- Redistricting Committee (HRED)
- Sentencing, Penalties and Criminal Procedure Subcommittee (HJUC-SPCP)
- Sex Offenses and Sex Offender Registration Committee (HJUC-SOSO)
- Tourism Committee (SHTO)
- Veterans' Affairs Committee (HVET)
