= Jim Kirkpatrick (Illinois politician) =

American politician

Member of the Illinois House of Representatives from the 117th district
- In office January 4, 2017 – January 11, 2017
- Preceded by: John E. Bradley
- Succeeded by: Dave Severin

Personal details
- Party: Democratic
- Profession: Legislative Aide

Jim Kirkpatrick was a Democratic member of the Illinois House of Representatives, representing the 117th district for a brief period in January 2017. He was appointed to fill the vacancy left by John Bradley's early retirement after the latter's loss to Dave Severin. The 117th district, located in Southern Illinois and parts of the Metro Lakeland area, includes all or parts of Benton, Buckner, Bush, Cambria, Carbondale, Carterville, Christopher, Colp, Crab Orchard, Creal Springs, Energy, Ewing, Freeman Spur, Granville, Hanaford, Herrin, Hurst, Johnston City, Macedonia, Marion, McLeansboro, Mulkeytown, North City, Orient, Pittsburg, Royalton, Sesser, Spillertown, Stonefort, Thompsonville, Valier, West City, West Frankfort, Whiteash, and Zeigler.
