= Halfway, Illinois (Little Juarez) =

Coordinates: 37.7928°N 88.9335°W

Halfway, (or Half Way) Illinois was a rough and very wet unincorporated community nicknamed "Little Juarez" in Williamson County, Illinois, at what is believed to the crossroads of Illinois Route 37 and Prosperity Road between Marion and Johnston City. Its heyday was between 1915 and 1925. The name originated because it was about halfway between Marion and Herrin, located a few miles to the west on what is now a county highway (Stotlar Road). The nickname came about from the general lawlessness, shootings and proliferation of gambling and booze, even during Prohibition.

It is not to be confused with another ghost town in the county by the same name, Halfway, Illinois, that was a post office and country general store about halfway from Marion and Corinth.

== History ==
One of the earliest references to the community dates to September 1916 when the circuit judge, D. T. Hartwell, issued an injunction against 31 saloons and clubs in nearby Herrin restraining them from "selling intoxicating liquors of any kind." The sheriff and his deputy (and future Prohibition-Era sheriff) George Galligan served the court injunctions on establishments on the 9th. A few days later one of the Marion newspapers noted that "Herrin is again dry," and that "now Energy and Half Way will become points of interest to Herrin tourists."

Following the onslaught of nationwide Prohibition in 1920, Halfway indeed became an even bigger destination with joints on just about all corners. Charlie Birger, an area bootlegger and gangster became the best known of the local operators. The joints became targets of Klan raids in 1923 and early 1924, followed by two targeted fires which eventually destroyed all of the buildings but Birger's.

On October 7, 1924, Birger's joint burned at Half Way, identified as 3.5 miles north of Marion. "This was one of the buildings which had been closed for a year under a government injunction and was where one room had been used for the sale of refreshments contrary to the law while the other had been prepared for a dance hall altho it had not been opened when the injunction went into effect. At that time it was reported that it was controlled by Charlie Birger. The origin of the fire is unknown. The building was of frame and it and its contents were a total loss."

In June 1925, a reporter described what was left. "For nearly a year, the lone building [Birger's joint] stood alone on the state concrete highway but nothing now remains but weeds, charred wood and broken bottles." Before the fires and the raids, "saloons, dance floors, restaurants and sleeping rooms made up the settlement." He claimed the settlement, also known as Little Juarez, was really a part of Whiteash, but it's not clear if it was actually inside the village, or just adjacent to the village which was generally farther to the east.

=== Notable shootings ===
On June 3, 1923, Ralph "Scrambler" Hill, Charlie "Chink" Schafer and Ezra Fowler engaged in a gunfight leaving Fowler dead and Hill wounded in the thigh and leg. According to testimony at the coroner's inquest, Hill ran a craps game in the roadhouse on the southeast corner of the crossroads. Hill, Schafer, "Tick" Gallagher and Sue Riddle operated the roadhouse. Fowler worked as a coal miner and lived with his family in nearby Whiteash. He was 34 years old and left a widow and two children.

Later that year on November 14, 1923, Charlie Birger killed his bartender Cecil Knighton on the road between two of the roadhouses. Three days later on November 18, 1923, St. Louis gangster William F. "Whitey" Doering was killed on the porch of Birger's establishment and Birger was wounded. No clear account ever determined for certain who shot Doering, though most accounts agree that Doering shot Birger. The latter claimed the deadly shot that killed Doering came from a large car of gunmen that passed down the highway. Other rumors that circulated the following year pegged Doering's death on Birger's bodyguard and bartender that night, Jack "Hoghead" Davis.
