= Willeford, Illinois =

- Unincorporated community
- Location within Illinois Location within the United States
- Coordinates: 37°39′22″N 88°51′06″W
- Country: United States
- State: Illinois
- County: Williamson
- Elevation: 440 ft (130 m)
- Time zone: UTC-6 (Central (CST))
  - Summer (DST): UTC-5 (CDT)
- ZIP Code: 62922
- Area code: 618
- GNIS feature ID: 1736176

Willeford is an unincorporated community in Williamson County, Illinois, United States. The community is located along Illinois Route 166 2.7 miles (4.3 km) northwest of Creal Springs.
