= Blairsville, Williamson County, Illinois =

Blairsville, Illinois
- Unincorporated community
- Location within Illinois Location within the United States
- Coordinates: 37°48′40″N 89°07′25″W
- Country: United States
- State: Illinois
- County: Williamson

Area
  - Total: 1.01 sq mi (2.62 km^{2})
  - Land: 1.01 sq mi (2.61 km^{2})
  - Water: 0.0039 sq mi (0.01 km^{2})
- Elevation: 400 ft (120 m)

Population (2020)
  - Total: 243
  - Density: 240.7/sq mi (92.95/km^{2})
- Time zone: UTC-6 (Central (CST))
  - Summer (DST): UTC-5 (CDT)
- ZIP Code: 62918
- Area code: 618
- FIPS code: 17-06444
- GNIS feature ID: 2806456

Blairsville is a census designated place in Williamson County, Illinois, United States. The community is located along County Route 9 1.8 miles (2.9 km) southeast of Hurst and 2 miles (3.2 km) north of Cambria.

== Demographics ==
Historical population
| Census | Pop. | Note | %± |
|---|---|---|---|
| 2020 | 243 | | — |
U.S. Decennial Census

Blairsville first appeared as a census designated place in the 2020 United States census.
