= Absher =

Absher is a surname. Notable people with the surname include:

- Dick Absher (1944–2026), American football linebacker
- Tessema Abshero (born 1986), Ethiopian athlete

== See also ==
- Absher (application), Saudi Arabian mobile application
- Absher, Kentucky, United States, an unincorporated community
- Dykersburg, Illinois, United States, an unincorporated community known as Absher in the past
