= Paulton, Illinois =

- Unincorporated community
- Location within Illinois Location within the United States
- Coordinates: 37°45′50″N 88°48′14″W
- Country: United States
- State: Illinois
- County: Williamson
- Elevation: 541 ft (165 m)
- Time zone: UTC-6 (Central (CST))
  - Summer (DST): UTC-5 (CDT)
- ZIP Code: 62974
- Area code: 618
- GNIS feature ID: 415461

Paulton is an unincorporated community in eastern Williamson County, Illinois.

A post office by that name was established 24 September 1921, but it discontinued operations 31 July 1925. Since then it has been served by Marion's post office. Its population in 1958 was estimated at 125.

A feature about the community is that after the adoption of a county-wide 9-1-1 emergency response system in the mid 1990s, names had to be officially given to all the county roads and streets in unincorporated places. Although the original plats of Paulton had provided names, they were generally the most common names like Main and Elm that were already in use by Marion and even Crab Orchard, and thus in the same zip code. For the initial public hearing on road names, the road naming committee used as placeholders, names of early political parties (Whig, Federalist, etc.), hoping to get feedback from the community on what names they would like. No feedback was provided though. In the end, since Paulton meant Paul's Town, that provided the theme for the final street names. Today the interior streets of the community are named McCartney (for the singer), Simon (for both the singer and the senator), Saint (for the early Christian Apostle), Pope (for the many Catholic leaders so named), Revere (for the patriot) and Newman (for the actor).
