= No. 9, Illinois =

- Unincorporated community
- Location within Illinois Location within the United States
- Coordinates: 37°48′13″N 89°05′08″W
- Country: United States
- State: Illinois
- County: Williamson
- Time zone: UTC-6 (Central (CST))
  - Summer (DST): UTC-5 (CDT)
- ZIP Code: 62921
- Area code: 618

No. 9 is a predominantly African-American unincorporated community located in Williamson County, Illinois on the west side of the incorporated village of Colp. Historically, Colp was mostly white and No. 9 black. Its most famous establishment was Ma Hatchett's, operated by Johanna "Ma" Hatchett (1892–1961), a roadhouse and brothel that opened during Prohibition Era at least as early as 1927 and operated until closed following a raid by the Illinois State Police in 1957.

It is named for the local coal mine that open in 1905 and was bought by Madison Coal Company in 1906. The latter company named it their "No. 9" mine.
