= Palzo, Illinois =

- Unincorporated community
- Location within Illinois Location within the United States
- Coordinates: 37°38′55″N 88°45′48″W
- Country: United States
- State: Illinois
- County: Williamson
- Elevation: 436 ft (133 m)
- Time zone: UTC-6 (Central (CST))
  - Summer (DST): UTC-5 (CDT)
- ZIP Code: 62922
- Area code: 618
- GNIS feature ID: 1737334

Palzo is an unincorporated community in Williamson County, Illinois, United States. The community is located along County Route 12 4.5 miles (7.2 km) east-northeast of Creal Springs.
