= New Dennison, Illinois =

- Unincorporated community
- Location within Illinois Location within the United States
- Coordinates: 37°41′34″N 88°51′20″W
- Country: United States
- State: Illinois
- County: Williamson
- Elevation: 453 ft (138 m)
- Time zone: UTC-6 (Central (CST))
  - Summer (DST): UTC-5 (CDT)
- ZIP Code: 62959
- Area code: 618
- GNIS feature ID: 414392

New Dennison is an unincorporated community in Williamson County, Illinois, United States. The community is located along Illinois Route 166 4.7 miles (7.6 km) east-southeast of Marion.
