= Halfway, Illinois =

Coordinates: 37°48′02″N 88°49′02″W

Halfway, Illinois was an unincorporated community in northeastern Williamson County, Illinois located about halfway between the county seat of Marion and Corinth. A post office operated from 1895 to 1911 in a country store. The ZIP Code was 62974.

It is not to be confused with the later Halfway in Williamson County on Illinois Route 37 between Marion and Johnston City.

== History ==
Joseph H. Williams opened the post office February 5, 1895. Henry W. Rogers became postmaster two years later on August 3, 1897, but Williams took over the job again on December 1, 1897. He sold out to James Chadwell who updated the country store with a new stock of goods. Chadwell's daughter then became postmaster May 20, 1899. The elder Chadwell and his business partner John Leander Roberts, a Corinth storekeeper, sold the store to the Albert and Nicholas G. Riggs. Albert became postmaster June 14, 1905. When nearby Pittsburg, Illinois opened up, Albert moved there and became that town's postmaster. Nicholas took over for Albert at Halfway and became postmaster December 8, 1905. Operations discontinued on 15 December 1911. The area is now served by the Pittsburg Post Office.

== Geography ==
The store was located almost on the township line in Section 25, Township 8 South, Range 3 East of the Third Principal Meridian in what's known today as Lake Creek Precinct. Today the area is the intersection of Edwards Road (the old road to Corinth) and Dwina Road that runs along the township line.
