= Crenshaw Crossing, Illinois =

- Unincorporated community
- Location within Illinois Location within the United States
- Coordinates: 37°46′26″N 88°58′46″W
- Country: United States
- State: Illinois
- County: Williamson
- Elevation: 443 ft (135 m)
- Time zone: UTC-6 (Central (CST))
  - Summer (DST): UTC-5 (CDT)
- ZIP Code: 62959
- Area code: 618
- GNIS feature ID: 406767

Crenshaw, or Crenshaw Crossing, is an unincorporated community in Williamson County, Illinois located between Marion and Energy in West Marion Precinct. In 1958, it had an estimated population of 50.

Parts of the Herrin Massacre took place in and near the rural settlement on 21 June 1922. The Lester strip mine was located to the south. Replacement workers and mine guards were marched north from the mine to the community and then west to Moake Crossing and finally the Power Plant woods, where the initial massacre took place. The "crossing" part of the name came from the Coal Belt Electric Line interurban railroad and ran along what is now Crenshaw Road. Where it crossed to the other side of the road was the crossing.
