= Stiritz, Illinois =

- Unincorporated community
- Location within Illinois Location within the United States
- Coordinates: 37°50′10″N 88°56′54″W
- Country: United States
- State: Illinois
- County: Williamson
- Elevation: 407 ft (124 m)
- Time zone: UTC-6 (Central (CST))
  - Summer (DST): UTC-5 (CDT)
- ZIP Code: 62896
- Area code: 618
- GNIS feature ID: 419149

Stiritz is an unincorporated community in Williamson County, Illinois, United States. The community is located along Stiritz Road 1.6 miles (2.6 km) northwest of Johnston City. The city is named after a prominent businessman from Johnson City, Albert C. Stiritz. He leased the area in 1902, and opened a mine.
