= Dykersburg, Illinois =

- Unincorporated community
- Location within Illinois Location within the United States
- Coordinates: 37°41′32″N 88°44′23″W
- Country: United States
- State: Illinois
- County: Williamson
- Elevation: 548 ft (167 m)
- Time zone: UTC-6 (Central (CST))
  - Summer (DST): UTC-5 (CDT)
- ZIP Code: 62987
- Area code: 618
- GNIS feature ID: 407554

Dykersburg is an unincorporated community in eastern Williamson County, Illinois in what is now Crab Orchard Precinct. It was also known as Absher, though that name had fallen into disuse by the mid 20th century.

The post office was established as Absher on 27 July 1892 and named for the first postmaster, William A. Absher. The name changed to Dykersburg on 10 September 1898. On 17 April 1899, it changed back to Absher. It discontinued operations on 14 April 1908. Residents are now served by post office at Stonefort.

The community is now served by the Crab Orchard Community Unit School District #3, the Crab Orchard Public Library District and the Williamson County Fire Protection District.
