= Crainville, Illinois =

Crainville
- Village
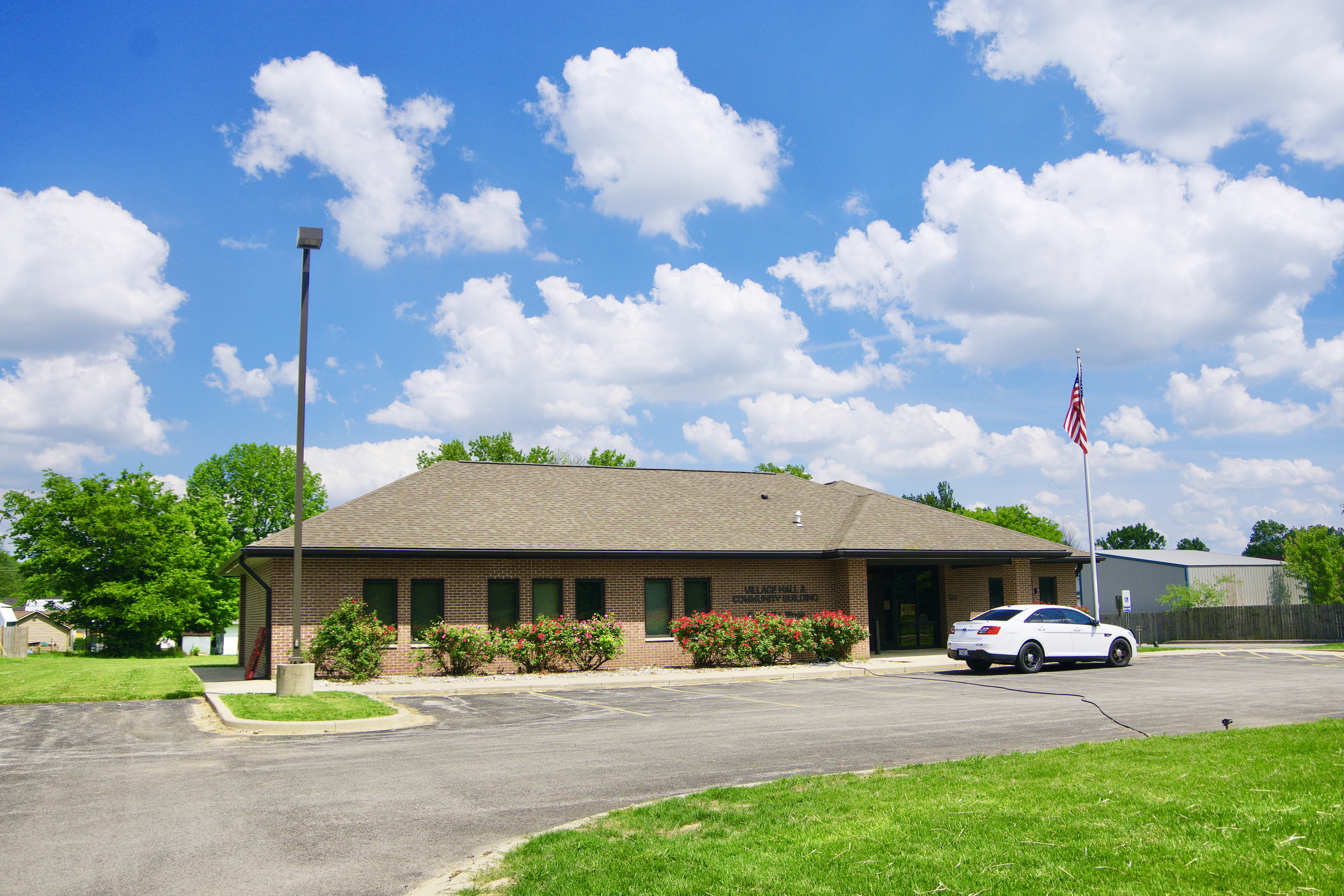
- Village Hall
- Motto: Our roots run deep
- Location of Crainville in Williamson County, Illinois.

- Location of Illinois in the United States
- Coordinates: 37°44′56″N 89°3′57″W
- Country: United States
- State: Illinois
- County: Williamson

Area
  - Total: 1.66 sq mi (4.31 km^{2})
  - Land: 1.65 sq mi (4.28 km^{2})
  - Water: 0.012 sq mi (0.03 km^{2})
- Elevation: 472 ft (144 m)

Population (2020)
  - Total: 1,443
  - Density: 873.2/sq mi (337.14/km^{2})
- Time zone: UTC-6 (CST)
  - Summer (DST): UTC-5 (CDT)
- ZIP Code: 62918
- Area code: 618
- FIPS code: 17-17185
- GNIS feature ID: 2398644
- Wikimedia Commons: Crainville, Illinois
- Website: www.crainville.net

Crainville is a village in Williamson County, Illinois, United States. As of the 2020 census, Crainville had a population of 1,443.

== History ==
One of the earliest mining communities in Williamson County, Crainville is named for James M. Crain, who filed the first plat for the village. It was initially known as "Crain City," but incorporated as the village of Crainville on June 28, 1881. A post office opened on September 26, 1888, also under the name Crainville. It discontinued operations on January 31, 1914, and the community is now served by the post office at neighboring Carterville.

== Geography ==
Crainville is located at 37°44′56″N 89°3′57″W (37.748761, -89.065718).

According to the 2010 census, Crainville has a total area of 1.597 square miles (4.14 km^{2}), of which 1.59 square miles (4.12 km^{2}) (or 99.56%) is land and 0.007 square miles (0.02 km^{2}) (or 0.44%) is water.

== Demographics ==
Historical population
Census	Pop.	Note	%±
1900	290		—
1910	446		53.8%
1920	557		24.9%
1930	413		−25.9%
1940	371		−10.2%
1950	433		16.7%
1960	421		−2.8%
1970	549		30.4%
1980	910		65.8%
1990	1,019		12.0%
2000	992		−2.6%
2010	1,256		26.6%
2020	1,443		14.9%
U.S. Census

=== 2020 census ===
As of the 2020 census, Crainville had a population of 1,443. The median age was 40.5 years. 23.3% of residents were under the age of 18 and 18.8% of residents were 65 years of age or older. For every 100 females there were 97.7 males, and for every 100 females age 18 and over there were 87.6 males age 18 and over.

99.0% of residents lived in urban areas, while 1.0% lived in rural areas.

There were 624 households in Crainville, of which 31.6% had children under the age of 18 living in them. Of all households, 53.2% were married-couple households, 16.2% were households with a male householder and no spouse or partner present, and 25.8% were households with a female householder and no spouse or partner present. About 28.4% of all households were made up of individuals and 13.9% had someone living alone who was 65 years of age or older.

There were 669 housing units, of which 6.7% were vacant. The homeowner vacancy rate was 0.8% and the rental vacancy rate was 11.2%.

Racial composition as of the 2020 census
Race	Number	Percent
White	1,311	90.9%
Black or African American	29	2.0%
American Indian and Alaska Native	0	0.0%
Asian	25	1.7%
Native Hawaiian and Other Pacific Islander	0	0.0%
Some other race	8	0.6%
Two or more races	70	4.9%
Hispanic or Latino (of any race)	28	1.9%

=== 2000 census ===
As of the 2000 census, there were 992 people, 425 households, and 265 families residing in the village. The population density was 709.9 inhabitants per square mile (274.1/km^{2}). There were 459 housing units at an average density of 328.5 per square mile (126.8/km^{2}). The racial makeup of the village was 97.78% White, 0.71% African American, 0.20% Native American, 0.20% Asian, 0.20% from other races, and 0.91% from two or more races. Hispanic or Latino of any race were 0.40% of the population.

There were 425 households, out of which 31.8% had children under the age of 18 living with them, 49.6% were married couples living together, 11.5% had a female householder with no husband present, and 37.6% were non-families. 32.5% of all households were made up of individuals, and 12.9% had someone living alone who was 65 years of age or older. The average household size was 2.33 and the average family size was 3.01.

In the village, the population was spread out, with 24.2% under the age of 18, 9.3% from 18 to 24, 29.8% from 25 to 44, 23.7% from 45 to 64, and 13.0% who were 65 years of age or older. The median age was 37 years. For every 100 females, there were 82.7 males. For every 100 females age 18 and over, there were 81.6 males.

The median income for a household in the village was $35,750, and the median income for a family was $48,021. Males had a median income of $34,219 versus $20,972 for females. The per capita income for the village was $17,911. About 6.6% of families and 8.8% of the population were below the poverty line, including 7.0% of those under age 18 and 6.3% of those age 65 or over.
