= Williamson County, Illinois =

County in Illinois, United States

- County
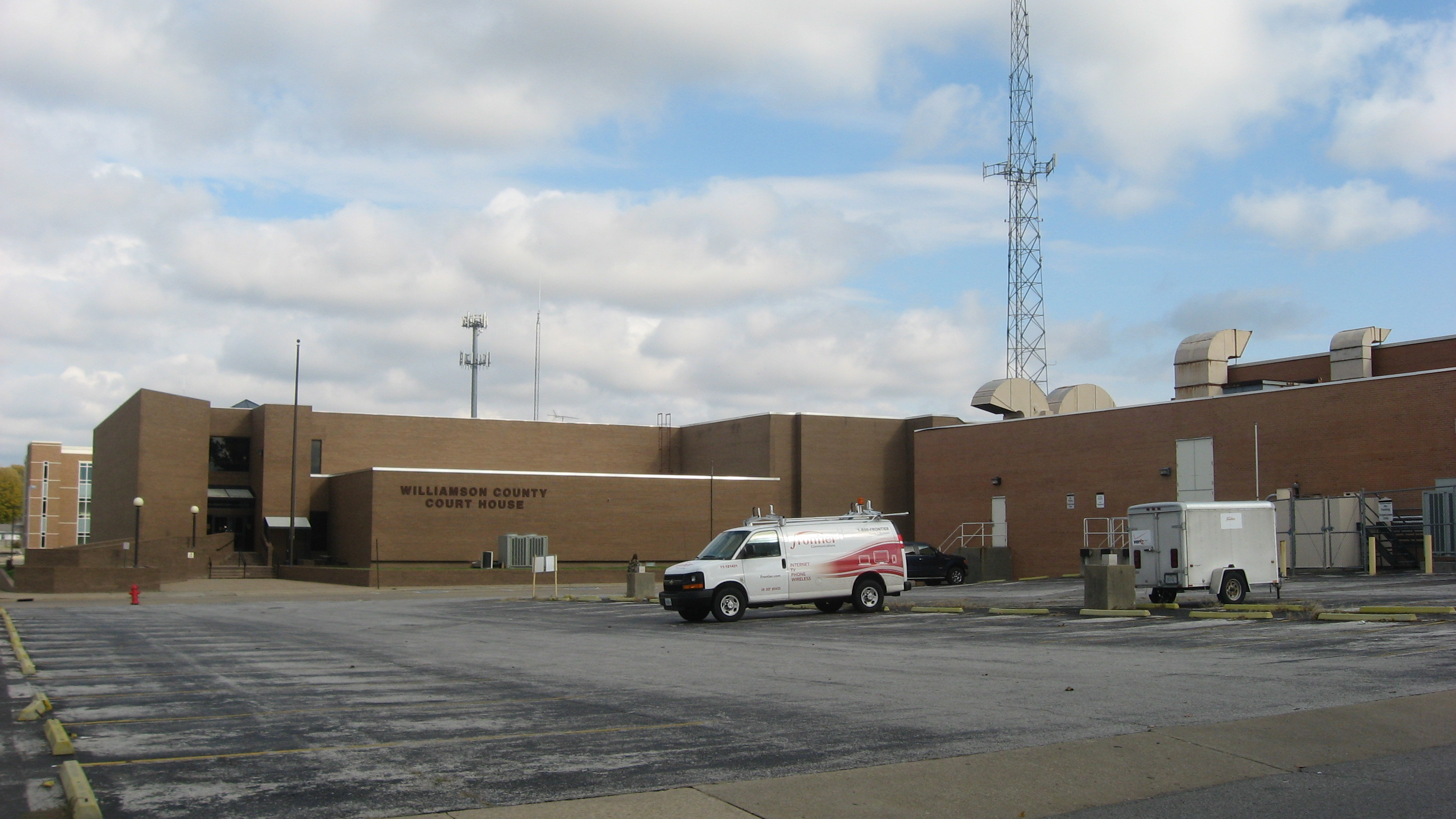
- Williamson County Courthouse in Marion

- Seal

- Location within the U.S. state of Illinois
- Coordinates: 37°44′N 88°56′W
- Country: United States
- State: Illinois
- Founded: February 28, 1839
- Named for: Williamson County, Tennessee
- Seat: Marion
- Largest city: Marion

Area
  - Total: 444 sq mi (1,150 km^{2})
  - Land: 420 sq mi (1,100 km^{2})
  - Water: 24 sq mi (62 km^{2}) 5.4%

Population (2020)
  - Total: 67,153
  - Estimate (2025): 67,225 ▲
  - Density: 160/sq mi (62/km^{2})
- Time zone: UTC−6 (Central)
  - Summer (DST): UTC−5 (CDT)
- Congressional district: 12th
- Website: www.williamsoncountyil.gov

Williamson County is a county in Illinois and is part of the Metro Lakeland area of Southern Illinois. Its largest city and county seat is Marion. As of the 2020 census, it had a population of 67,153.

== History ==
Williamson County was formed from Franklin County on February 28, 1839, and was named for Williamson County, Tennessee. Many of its settlers were from the Uplands South, traveling via the Ohio River from Kentucky and Virginia.

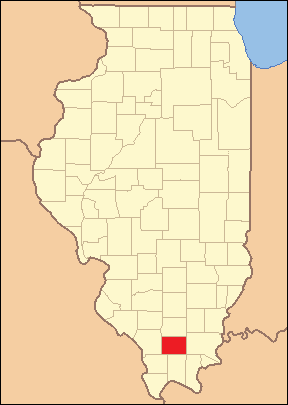
Williamson County at the time of its creation in 1839

It became a center of coal mining, attracting numerous European immigrants in the late 19th and early 20th centuries. Labor tensions rose as workers sought to unionize and improve their wages and conditions. Mine owners resisted and several episodes of violence resulted during strikes and other work actions. Williamson County is often referred to as "Bloody Williamson," due to several outbreaks of violence that have few parallels in American history.

These include the Bloody Vendetta (1876), armed confrontation between families and associates during the waning days of Reconstruction; the Carterville Massacre (1899), a Coal Strike (1906), the Herrin Massacre (1922), the Klan War (1924–1926), and the Birger/Shelton Gang War (1926).

During the so-called Klan War, a mob of perhaps 1,300 men were deputized by the local sheriff. Starting on February 1, 1924, the posse began raiding the homes of local mine workers, mostly Italian immigrants. The Klan was inspired by both nativist and Prohibitionist fervor. Violence continued sporadically between bootleggers and the Klan. Twenty people were killed before peace was restored.

In June 1915, a Sicilian miner accused of the fatal shooting of a wealthy local resident was lynched in Johnston City, Illinois by a mob. The Illinois National Guard was deployed to prevent rioting between the miner's supporters and opponents. They were also later ordered to various locations repeatedly during the 1920s to separate warring parties and attempt to keep order.

The northwest section of the county suffered extensive damage during the Tri-State Tornado of 1925. The county was also struck by two tornadoes on May 29, 1982, which killed 10 people in the Marion, Illinois tornado outbreak. On May 8, 2009, the cities of Carterville, Herrin, and Marion were severely damaged by the May 2009 Southern Midwest derecho.

== Geography ==
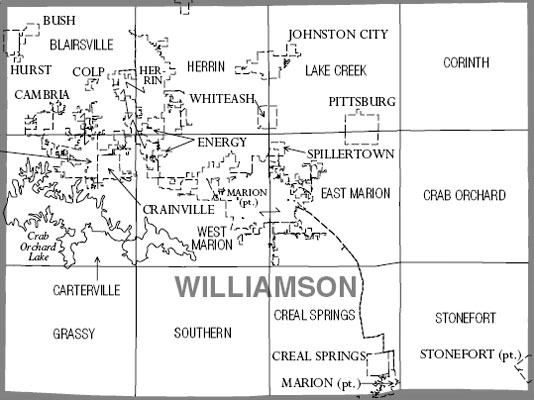
Map of Williamson County, Illinois

According to the U.S. Census Bureau, the county has a total area of 444 square miles (1,150 km^{2}), of which 420 square miles (1,100 km^{2}) is land and 24 square miles (62 km^{2}) (5.4%) is water.

=== Adjacent counties ===
- Franklin County (north)
- Saline County (east)
- Pope County (southeast)
- Johnson County (south)
- Union County (southwest)
- Jackson County (west)

=== National protected area ===
- Crab Orchard National Wildlife Refuge (part)

=== Major highways ===
- Interstate 24
- Interstate 57
- U.S. Highway 45
- Illinois Route 13
- Illinois Route 37
- Illinois Route 148
- Illinois Route 149
- Illinois Route 166

=== Transit ===
- Rides Mass Transit District
- South Central Transit
- Greyhound Lines
- List of intercity bus stops in Illinois

=== Airport ===
Veterans Airport of Southern Illinois in Marion is the local airport.

== Climate and weather ==
Marion, Illinois

Climate chart (precipitation, max. and min. temperature)
J	F	M	A	M	J	J	A	S	O	N	D
3.3 38 19	3.2 44 23	4.5 55 33	4.5 66 42	4.9 75 52	4.3 83 61	3.9 87 65	3.7 86 63	3.1 79 55	3.1 68 43	4.8 55 34	3.7 43 24
- █ Average max. and min. temperatures in °F
- █ Precipitation totals in inches
- Source: The Weather Channel
Metric conversion
J	F	M	A	M	J	J	A	S	O	N	D
83 3 −7	81 7 −5	113 13 1	115 19 6	125 24 11	110 28 16	99 31 18	94 30 17	80 26 13	78 20 6	121 13 1	94 6 −4
- █ Average max. and min. temperatures in °C
- █ Precipitation totals in mm

Williamson County lies on the border between humid continental climate (Köppen climate classification Dfa) and humid subtropical climate (Köppen climate classification Cfa), with neither large mountains nor large bodies of water to moderate its temperature. It is subject to both cold Arctic air and hot, humid tropical air from the Gulf of Mexico and, along with the rest of the midwestern United States, is home to some of the largest temperature extremes in the world.

The region has four distinct seasons. Spring is the wettest season and produces erratic severe weather ranging from tornadoes to winter storms. Summers are hot and humid, with only occasional and brief respite, and the humidity often makes the heat index rise to temperatures feeling well above 100 °F (38 °C). Fall is mild with lower humidity and can produce intermittent bouts of heavy rainfall, with the first snow flurries usually forming in late November. Winters are cold with periodic snow and temperatures often below freezing; however, thaws are usually frequent. Winter storm systems, such as Alberta clippers and Panhandle hooks, can bring days of heavy freezing rain, ice pellets, and snowfall.

The normal high temperature in July is 90 °F (32 °C), and the normal low temperature in January is 19 °F (−7 °C), although this varies from year to year. Both 100 and 0 °F (37.8 and −17.8 °C) temperatures can be seen on an average 2 or 3 days per year. In recent years, average temperatures have ranged from a low of 19 °F (−7 °C) in January to a high of 88 °F (31 °C) in July, although a record low of −25 °F (−32 °C) was recorded in January 1977 and a record high of 113 °F (45 °C) was recorded in August 1977. Average monthly precipitation ranged from 3.06 inches (78 mm) in October to 4.93 inches (125 mm) in May.

Williamson County has thunderstorms about 50 days a year on average. Thunderstorms contribute over half of the annual precipitation. Especially in the spring, these storms can often be severe, with high winds, large hail and tornadoes.

Some late autumns feature the warm weather known as Indian summer; some years see roses in bloom as late as early December.

== Demographics ==
Historical population
Census	Pop.	Note	%±
1840	4,457		—
1850	7,216		61.9%
1860	12,205		69.1%
1870	17,329		42.0%
1880	19,324		11.5%
1890	22,226		15.0%
1900	27,796		25.1%
1910	45,098		62.2%
1920	61,092		35.5%
1930	53,880		−11.8%
1940	51,424		−4.6%
1950	48,621		−5.5%
1960	46,117		−5.2%
1970	49,021		6.3%
1980	56,538		15.3%
1990	57,733		2.1%
2000	61,296		6.2%
2010	66,357		8.3%
2020	67,153		1.2%
2025 (est.)	67,225	▲	0.1%
U.S. Decennial Census; 1790-1960 1900-1990; 1990-2000 2010-2013

=== 2020 census ===
As of the 2020 census, the county had a population of 67,153. The median age was 41.9 years; 21.8% of residents were under the age of 18 and 20.0% were 65 years of age or older. For every 100 females there were 99.5 males, and for every 100 females age 18 and over there were 97.3 males age 18 and over.

The racial makeup of the county was 87.7% White, 4.3% Black or African American, 0.4% American Indian and Alaska Native, 1.2% Asian, <0.1% Native Hawaiian and Pacific Islander, 0.8% from some other race, and 5.6% from two or more races. Hispanic or Latino residents of any race comprised 2.6% of the population.

59.0% of residents lived in urban areas, while 41.0% lived in rural areas.

There were 28,145 households in the county, of which 28.1% had children under the age of 18 living in them. Of all households, 46.4% were married-couple households, 18.6% were households with a male householder and no spouse or partner present, and 28.2% were households with a female householder and no spouse or partner present. About 31.1% of all households were made up of individuals and 14.4% had someone living alone who was 65 years of age or older.

There were 31,818 housing units, of which 11.5% were vacant. Among occupied housing units, 69.1% were owner-occupied and 30.9% were renter-occupied. The homeowner vacancy rate was 2.8% and the rental vacancy rate was 14.1%.

=== Racial and ethnic composition ===
Williamson County, Illinois – Racial and ethnic composition Note: the US Census treats Hispanic/Latino as an ethnic category. This table excludes Latinos from the racial categories and assigns them to a separate category. Hispanics/Latinos may be of any race.
Race / Ethnicity (NH = Non-Hispanic)	Pop 1980	Pop 1990	Pop 2000	Pop 2010	Pop 2020	% 1980	% 1990	% 2000	% 2010	% 2020
White alone (NH)	55,106	55,802	58,006	60,719	58,193	97.47%	96.66%	94.63%	91.50%	86.66%
Black or African American alone (NH)	843	1,130	1,498	2,514	2,809	1.49%	1.96%	2.44%	3.79%	4.18%
Native American or Alaska Native alone (NH)	67	105	149	206	230	0.12%	0.18%	0.24%	0.31%	0.34%
Asian alone (NH)	161	235	304	557	771	0.28%	0.41%	0.50%	0.84%	1.15%
Native Hawaiian or Pacific Islander alone (NH)	x	x	16	8	9	x	x	0.03%	0.01%	0.01%
Other race alone (NH)	66	13	32	56	207	0.12%	0.02%	0.05%	0.08%	0.31%
Mixed race or Multiracial (NH)	x	x	528	996	3,155	x	x	0.86%	1.50%	4.70%
Hispanic or Latino (any race)	295	448	763	1,301	1,779	0.52%	0.78%	1.24%	1.96%	2.65%
Total	56,538	57,733	61,296	66,357	67,153	100.00%	100.00%	100.00%	100.00%	100.00%

=== 2010 census ===
As of the 2010 United States census, there were 66,357 people, 27,421 households, and 17,999 families residing in the county. The population density was 157.9 inhabitants per square mile (61.0/km^{2}). There were 30,359 housing units at an average density of 72.3 per square mile (27.9/km^{2}). The racial makeup of the county was 92.7% white, 3.8% black or African American, 0.8% Asian, 0.4% Native American, 0.5% from other races, and 1.7% from two or more races. Those of Hispanic or Latino origin made up 2.0% of the population. In terms of ancestry, 23.6% were German, 17.3% were Irish, 16.0% were English, 9.0% were American, and 6.1% were Italian.

Of the 27,421 households, 30.2% had children under the age of 18 living with them, 49.4% were married couples living together, 11.5% had a female householder with no husband present, 34.4% were non-families, and 29.1% of all households were made up of individuals. The average household size was 2.35 and the average family size was 2.88. The median age was 40.1 years.

The median income for a household in the county was $40,579 and the median income for a family was $50,929. Males had a median income of $41,428 versus $30,901 for females. The per capita income for the county was $22,164. About 13.3% of families and 16.7% of the population were below the poverty line, including 24.3% of those under age 18 and 9.9% of those age 65 or over.

== Communities ==
=== Cities ===
- Carbondale (mostly in Jackson County)
- Carterville
- Creal Springs
- Herrin
- Hurst
- Johnston City
- Marion (seat) (partly in Johnson County)

=== Villages ===
- Bush
- Cambria
- Colp
- Crainville
- Energy
- Freeman Spur (partly in Franklin County)
- Pittsburg
- Spillertown
- Stonefort (mostly in Saline County)

=== Census-designated places ===
- Blairsville
- Crab Orchard
- Whiteash

=== Other unincorporated communities ===
- Attila
- Corinth
- Crenshaw
- Dewmaine
- Dog Walk
- Dykersburg
- Fergestown
- Hudgens
- New Dennison
- No. 9
- Paineville
- Palzo
- Paulton
- Pulleys Mill
- Stiritz
- Willeford

=== Ghost towns ===
- Chamness
- Clifford
- Dewmaine
- Halfway
- Halfway (Little Juarez)

=== Precincts ===
The following precincts are not voting precincts, but represent the 12 Congressional townships in Williamson County. Most have multiple voting precincts.

- Blairsville
- Carterville
- Corinth
- Crab Orchard
- Creal Springs
- East Marion
- Grassy
- Herrin
- Lake Creek
- Southern
- Stonefort
- West Marion

== Education ==
School districts include:

K-12:

- Carrier Mills-Stonefort Community Unit School District
- Carterville Community Unit School District 5
- Crab Orchard Community Unit School District 3
- Frankfort Community Unit School District 168
- Galatia Community Unit School District 1
- Herrin Community Unit School District 4
- Johnston City Community Unit School District 1
- Marion Community Unit School District 2
- Zeigler-Royalton Community Unit School District 188

Secondary:

- Carbondale Community High School District 165
- Vienna High School District 133

Elementary:

- Giant City Community Consolidated School District 130
- New Simpson Hill Consolidated District 32

== Government and infrastructure ==
United States Penitentiary, Marion is located in Southern Precinct in Williamson County.

== Politics ==
Williamson County has been solidly Republican on the national level, voting for the Republican candidates for U.S. president since 2000.

United States presidential election results for Williamson County, Illinois
Year	Republican		Democratic		Third party(ies)	
Year	No.	%	No.	%	No.	%
1892	2,504	51.33%	2,118	43.42%	256	5.25%
1896	3,027	53.70%	2,582	45.80%	28	0.50%
1900	3,723	56.93%	2,760	42.20%	57	0.87%
1904	4,044	58.96%	1,996	29.10%	819	11.94%
1908	4,786	52.63%	3,513	38.63%	794	8.73%
1912	3,209	34.63%	3,258	35.16%	2,800	30.21%
1916	10,262	53.50%	8,172	42.61%	746	3.89%
1920	10,118	56.73%	4,728	26.51%	2,988	16.75%
1924	9,366	45.27%	6,117	29.57%	5,206	25.16%
1928	10,913	51.21%	10,139	47.58%	257	1.21%
1932	8,714	39.14%	12,961	58.21%	590	2.65%
1936	12,319	45.07%	14,663	53.64%	352	1.29%
1940	14,433	49.40%	14,645	50.12%	139	0.48%
1944	12,594	55.55%	9,974	43.99%	103	0.45%
1948	10,386	51.02%	9,841	48.34%	130	0.64%
1952	13,348	55.10%	10,838	44.74%	37	0.15%
1956	13,438	56.44%	10,345	43.45%	27	0.11%
1960	13,732	54.72%	11,335	45.17%	29	0.12%
1964	9,130	38.45%	14,613	61.55%	0	0.00%
1968	11,886	50.39%	9,660	40.95%	2,042	8.66%
1972	14,101	60.02%	9,202	39.17%	189	0.80%
1976	10,703	43.59%	13,600	55.39%	250	1.02%
1980	14,451	55.10%	10,779	41.10%	998	3.81%
1984	14,930	56.06%	11,614	43.61%	86	0.32%
1988	12,274	48.84%	12,712	50.58%	144	0.57%
1992	9,462	32.90%	14,361	49.93%	4,937	17.17%
1996	9,734	38.52%	12,510	49.50%	3,028	11.98%
2000	14,012	52.01%	12,192	45.26%	735	2.73%
2004	18,086	60.37%	11,685	39.00%	189	0.63%
2008	17,039	56.30%	12,589	41.59%	638	2.11%
2012	17,909	61.22%	10,647	36.40%	698	2.39%
2016	21,570	67.72%	8,581	26.94%	1,701	5.34%
2020	22,801	67.60%	10,206	30.26%	723	2.14%
2024	22,686	68.38%	9,890	29.81%	598	1.80%

== See also ==
- National Register of Historic Places listings in Williamson County
- Ku Klux Klan in Southern Illinois
