= Williamson County Courthouse (Illinois) =

Local government building in the United States

Coordinates: 37°43′57″N 88°55′45″W

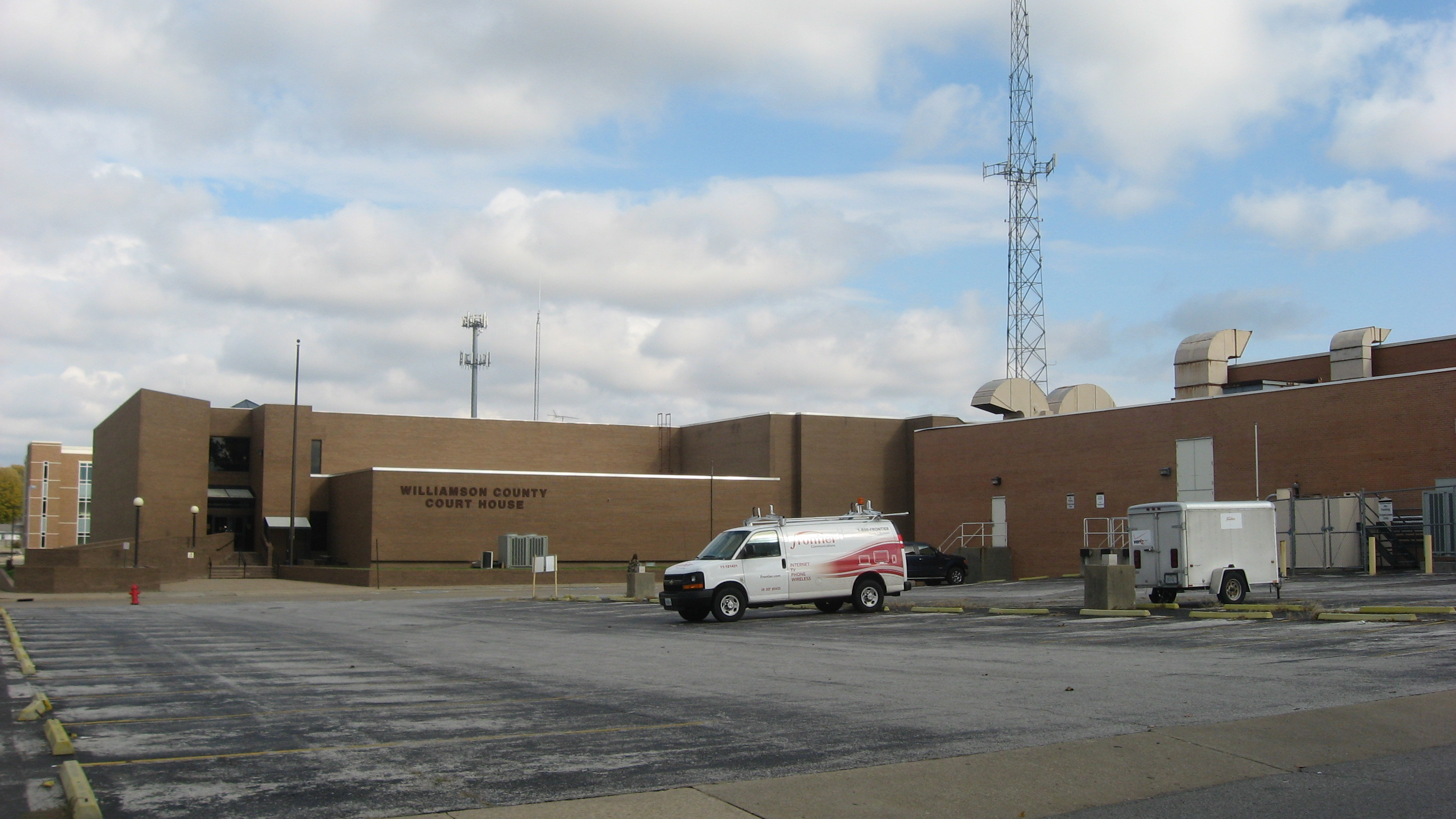
Southern front of the courthouse

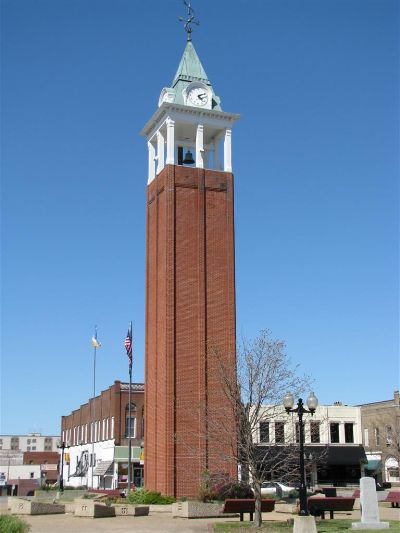
Clock tower on the public square, the remnant of the previous courthouse

The Williamson County Courthouse is a government building in Marion, the county seat of Williamson County, Illinois, United States. Built in 1971, it is the fourth courthouse in Marion's history.

Land was registered in today's Williamson County as early as 1814, but the county itself was formed only in 1839 from the southern half of Franklin County. No county seat was named by the organic act; instead, the original officials were responsible to ascertain a location for the seat, and they chose the location of Marion following a donation by local landowners. The city first incorporated in 1851.

Williamson County's first public buildings, a clerk's office and jail, were built on Marion's public square in 1840. Two years passed before the completion of the first courthouse, a square brick structure that stood until 1859, following the construction of a larger replacement. This building endured only until 1875, when it became one of the victims of a great fire that consumed the entire public square. County officials spent the next ten years renting space in private buildings; only in 1886 could they win voter agreement for their plans to erect a replacement. Construction was finished in 1889, producing a Neoclassical building with pedimented facades and a central clock tower, and the building was expanded with Works Progress Administration assistance in 1939. However, the goal of energy efficiency prompted county officials to arrange for the construction of the present building in 1971, a modernist structure with no windows to allow heat to escape. The previous courthouse in the public square, no longer needed, was demolished except for its tower, which remains on the square.
