= Hudgens, Illinois =

- Unincorporated community
- Location within Illinois Location within the United States
- Coordinates: 37°39′18″N 88°56′27″W
- Country: United States
- State: Illinois
- County: Williamson
- Elevation: 499 ft (152 m)
- Time zone: UTC-6 (Central (CST))
  - Summer (DST): UTC-5 (CDT)
- ZIP Code: 62959
- Area code: 618
- GNIS feature ID: 422826

Hudgens is an unincorporated community in Williamson County, Illinois, United States. The community is located along County Route 19 and the Union Pacific Railroad 5.2 miles (8.4 km) south of Marion.
