= Dog Walk, Illinois =

- Unincorporated community
- Location within Illinois Location within the United States
- Coordinates: 37°45′33″N 88°55′58″W
- Country: United States
- State: Illinois
- County: Williamson
- Elevation: 499 ft (152 m)
- Time zone: UTC-6 (Central (CST))
  - Summer (DST): UTC-5 (CDT)
- ZIP Code: 62959
- Area code: 618
- GNIS feature ID: 407282

Dog Walk is an unincorporated community in Williamson County, in the U.S. state of Illinois.

According to tradition, the community was so named on account of local dogs forming paths leading to the community.
