= Attila, Illinois =

- Unincorporated community
- Location within Illinois Location within the United States
- Coordinates: 37°46′11″N 88°46′16″W
- Country: United States
- State: Illinois
- County: Williamson
- Elevation: 558 ft (170 m)
- Time zone: UTC-6 (Central (CST))
  - Summer (DST): UTC-5 (CDT)
- ZIP Code: 62974
- Area code: 618
- GNIS feature ID: 403708

Attila is an unincorporated community in Williamson County, Illinois, United States. Attila is located on County Route 15, 9 miles (14 km) northeast of Marion.
