= Clifford, Illinois =

- Unincorporated community
- Location within Illinois Location within the United States
- Coordinates: 37°49′25″N 89°04′38″W
- Country: United States
- State: Illinois
- County: Williamson
- Elevation: 387 ft (118 m)
- Time zone: UTC-6 (Central (CST))
  - Summer (DST): UTC-5 (CDT)
- ZIP Code: 62918
- Area code: 618
- GNIS feature ID: 422564

Clifford is a former unincorporated community in northwestern Williamson County, Illinois. It is a former early 20th century mining settlement that has almost disappeared since the closing of local mines.

A post office was established on 26 January 1905, and it remained in operation until after 1931.

The population in 1958 was listed as 300.
