= Paineville, Illinois =

- Unincorporated community
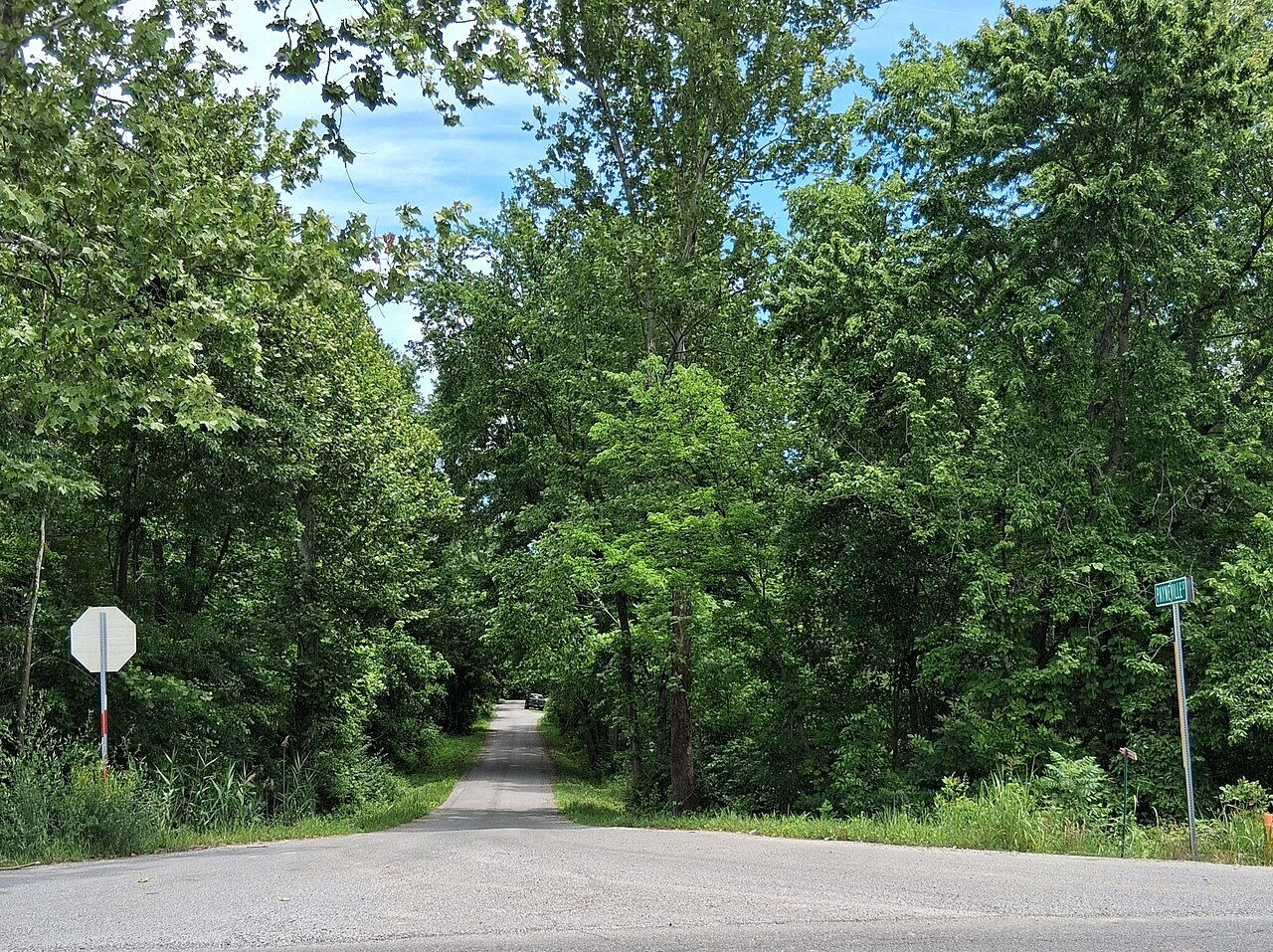
- Paineville St

- Location within Illinois Location within the United States
- Coordinates: 37°48′32″N 89°00′06″W
- Country: United States
- State: Illinois
- County: Williamson
- Elevation: 397 ft (121 m)
- Time zone: UTC-6 (Central (CST))
  - Summer (DST): UTC-5 (CDT)
- ZIP Code: 62948
- Area code: 618
- GNIS feature ID: 415297

Paineville is an unincorporated community in Williamson County, Illinois, United States. The community is located at the intersection of County Routes 2 and 29 1.5 miles (2.4 km) east of Herrin. In the 1920s it was home to a carnival that went bankrupt subsequently. The carnival was home to many exotic beasts, most notably a 28 ft Boa Constrictor.
