= Chamness, Illinois =

Former unincorporated community in Illinois, US

Coordinates: 37°40′37″N 88°59′19″W

Chamness, also known as "Chamnesstown," is a former unincorporated community in Williamson County, Illinois, that disappeared in the mid-1930s when the town was bulldozed for the construction of Crab Orchard Lake. The Lake was part of the Crab Orchard Impoundment Project and was begun as a W.P.A. project after the Federal Government purchased a large section of property which included the town. The construction of Crab Orchard Lake was finished in 1938 and the water of the lake began to cover the sight of Chamnesstown, although the lake is relatively shallow in the former town's location and one can see the foundations upon which rested the town buildings. The Federal Government also built the Illinois Ordnance Plant, called "Ordill", as part of the Crab Orchard Impoundment Project on property located adjacent to Crab Orchard Lake and the former town in the late 1930s. The Ordnance Plant became a major manufacturer of munitions following the entry of the country into World War II, at one point employing over 10,000 people. The site of the former Chamnesstown community is now located within the Crab Orchard National Wildlife Refuge southwest of Marion.

Sarah Chamness originally brought her family to the Chamnesstown area on Crab Orchard Creek in 1825 after she became a widow. Sarah's eldest son, Wiley B. Chamness, became a prominent Missionary Baptist preacher in the area. Wiley B. Chamness had seven sons, all of whom had homes in the Chamnesstown area.

The community post office was established 24 January 1889 and discontinued 30 April 1902. The ZIP Code was 62959. Marshall Chamness was the first postmaster of Chamnesstown and maintained the post office in a general store which had been established several years earlier by Joseph Mouser. Even after the closing of the post office in 1902, Chamnesstown continued to be important to the farmers of the area, who came to the town to sell their cream and eggs, get their corn ground into meal and to purchase farming supplies and feed for their stock.
