= Fergestown, Illinois =

- Unincorporated community
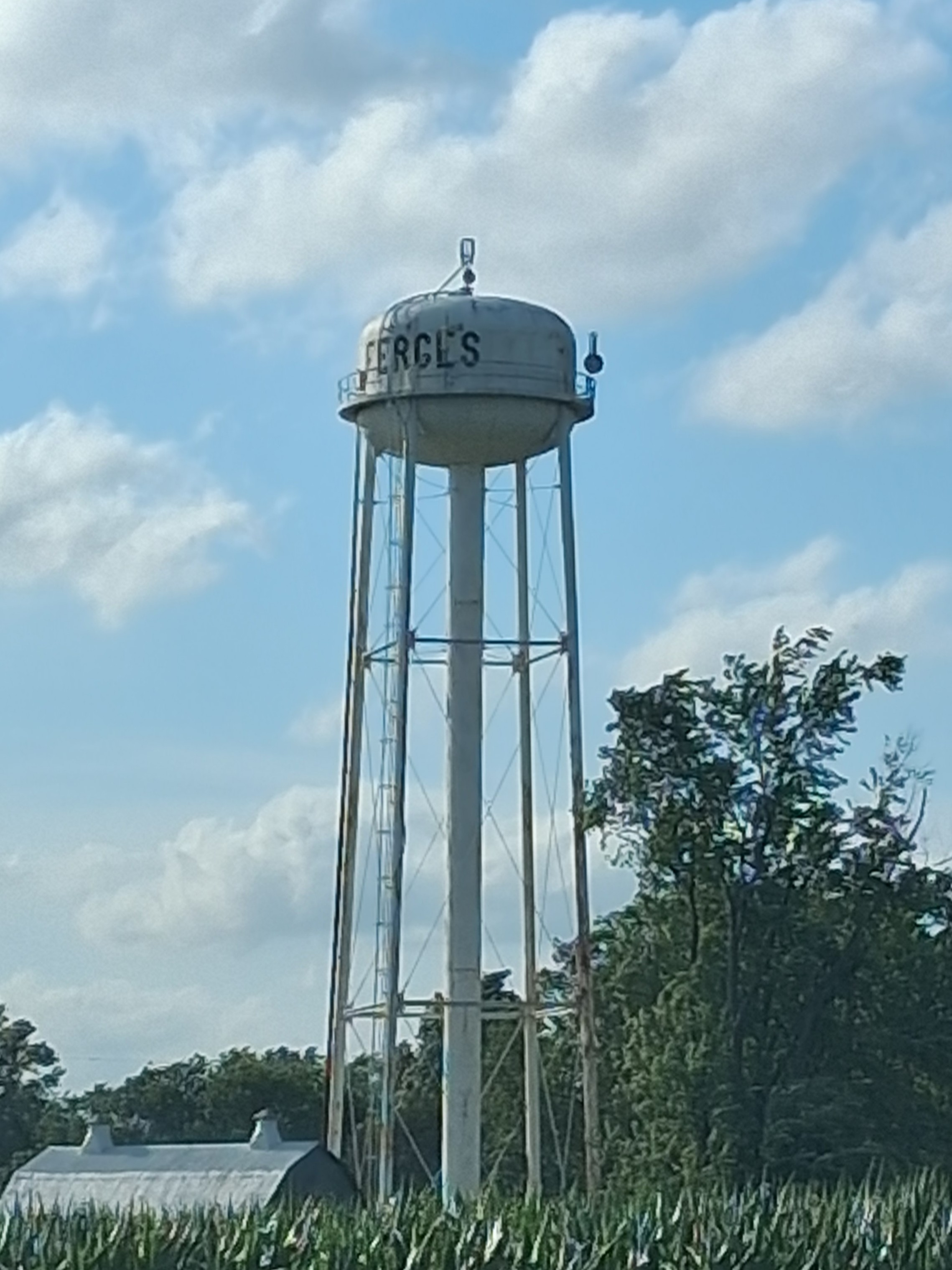
- Fergestown Watertower
- Nicknames: "Ferges," "Fudgetown"
- Location within Illinois Location within the United States
- Coordinates: 37°47′33″N 88°57′53″W
- Country: United States
- State: Illinois
- County: Williamson
- Elevation: 449 ft (137 m)
- Time zone: UTC-6 (Central (CST))
  - Summer (DST): UTC-5 (CDT)
- ZIP Code: 62959
- Area code: 618
- GNIS feature ID: 408327

Fergestown is an unincorporated community in Herrin Township, Williamson County, Illinois, United States. The community is on County Route 4 known as Stotlar Road, 2.8 miles (4.5 km) southwest of Johnston City and 3.5 miles (5.6 km) east of Herrin.
