= Stonefort, Illinois =

Stonefort
- Village
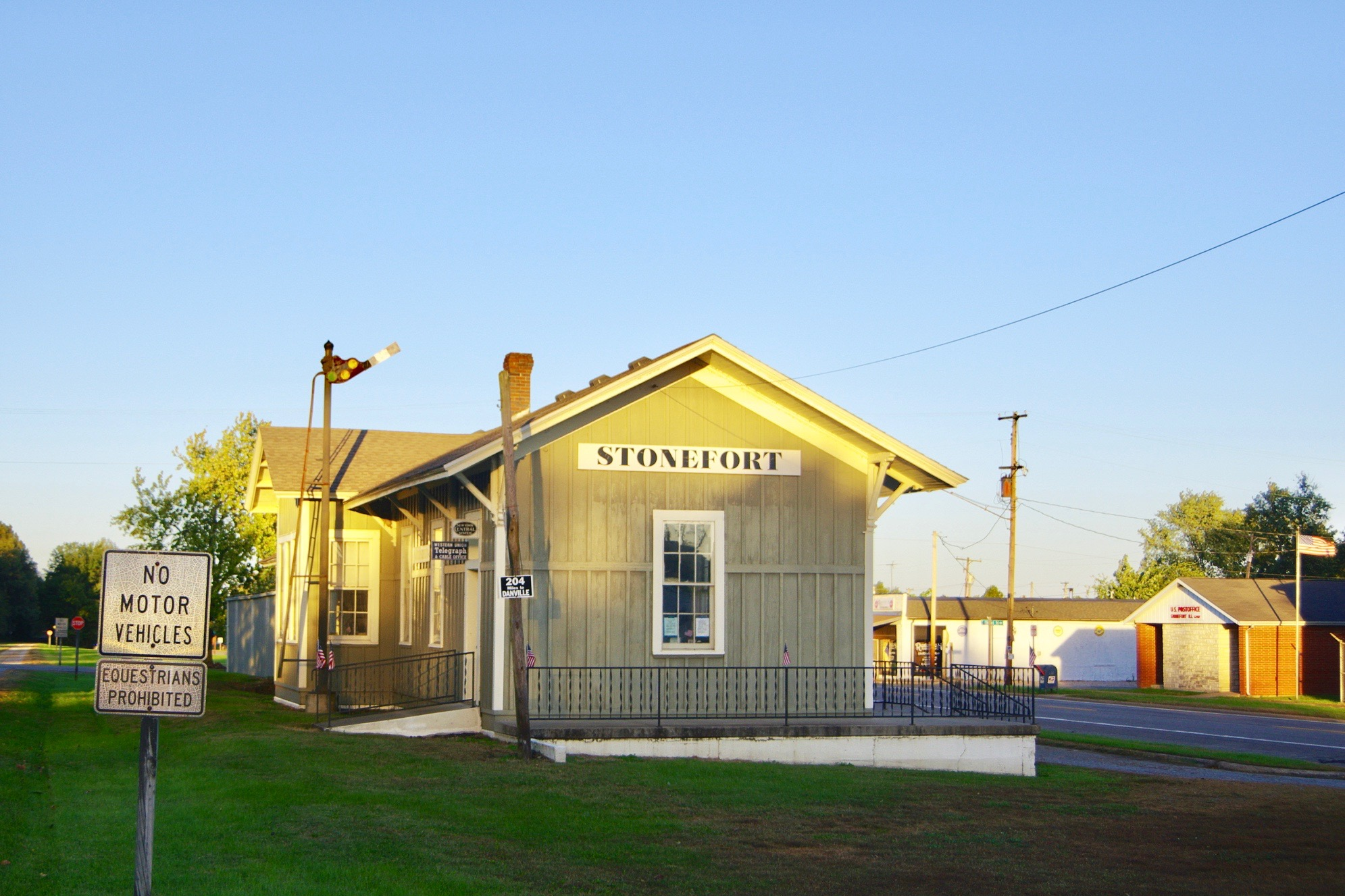
- Stonefort Depot

- Location of Stonefort in Saline & Williamson Counties, Illinois.
- Coordinates: 37°37′17″N 88°42′25″W
- Country: United States
- State: Illinois
- County: Saline, Williamson

Area
  - Total: 1.46 sq mi (3.78 km^{2})
  - Land: 1.46 sq mi (3.77 km^{2})
  - Water: 0.0039 sq mi (0.01 km^{2})
- Elevation: 404 ft (123 m)

Population (2020)
  - Total: 224
  - Density: 154.1/sq mi (59.49/km^{2})
- Time zone: UTC-6 (CST)
  - Summer (DST): UTC-5 (CDT)
- ZIP Code: 62987
- Area code: 618
- FIPS code: 17-72884
- GNIS feature ID: 2399909

Stonefort is a village in Saline and Williamson Counties, Illinois, United States. As of the 2020 census, Stonefort had a population of 224.

== History ==
Stonefort is named for an ancient rock fortification that stood in the vicinity when the first settlers started arriving in the area in the early 1800s. The village of Stonefort was established in the late 1850s, and was originally located about a mile to the southeast, near the edge of the bluff. When the Cairo and Vincennes Railroad (later part of the Big Four and New York Central systems) was completed through the area in the 1870s, Stonefort's public buildings were dismantled and moved to the village's present location, which was adjacent to the railroad tracks. The former site of the village is now listed as "Oldtown" on maps.

== Geography ==
Stonefort is located atop a ridge that rises above the South Fork Saline River valley to the north and the Little Saline River valley to the south. U.S. Route 45 connects Stonefort with Carrier Mills to the northeast and New Burnside to the southwest. The Tunnel Hill State Trail, a 45-mile (72 km) rail trail, traverses Stonefort.

According to the 2010 census, Stonefort has a total area of 1.456 square miles (3.77 km^{2}), of which 1.45 square miles (3.76 km^{2}) (or 99.59%) is land and 0.006 square miles (0.02 km^{2}) (or 0.41%) is water.

== Demographics ==
Historical population
Census	Pop.	Note	%±
1880	337		—
1890	464		37.7%
1900	479		3.2%
1910	485		1.3%
1920	456		−6.0%
1930	487		6.8%
1940	524		7.6%
1950	490		−6.5%
1960	349		−28.8%
1970	325		−6.9%
1980	316		−2.8%
1990	311		−1.6%
2000	292		−6.1%
2010	297		1.7%
2020	224		−24.6%
U.S. Census

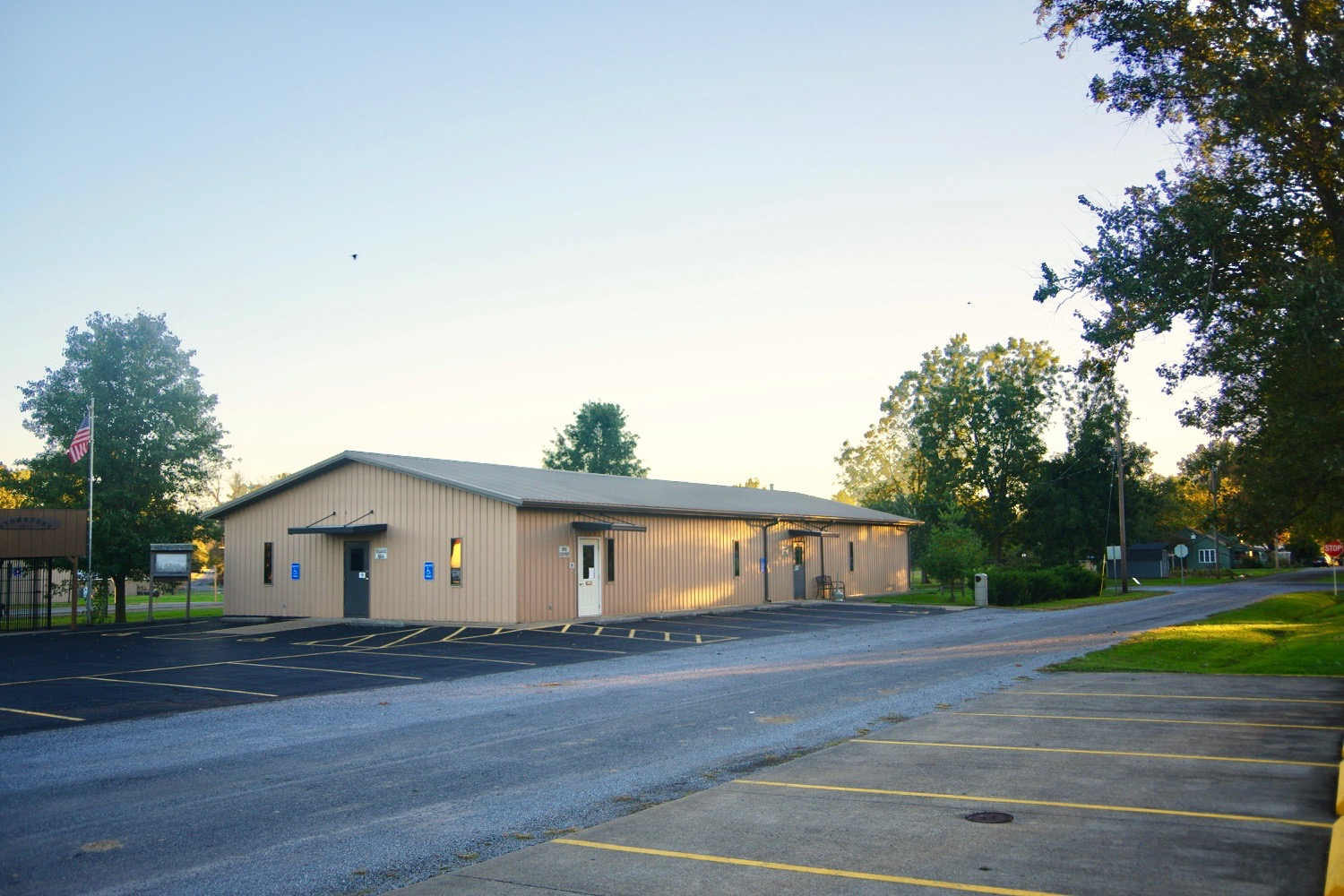
Stonefort Village Hall

As of the census of 2010, there were 297 people, 131 households, and 89 families residing in the village. The population density was 199.9 inhabitants per square mile (77.2/km^{2}). There were 144 housing units at an average density of 98.6 per square mile (38.1/km^{2}). The racial makeup of the village was 97.60% White, 1.03% African American, 1.03% from other races, and 0.34% from two or more races. Hispanic or Latino of any race were 1.71% of the population.

There were 131 households, out of which 24.4% had children under the age of 18 living with them, 53.4% were married couples living together, 9.9% had a female householder with no husband present, and 31.3% were non-families. 30.5% of all households were made up of individuals, and 19.1% had someone living alone who was 65 years of age or older. The average household size was 2.23 and the average family size was 2.70.

In the village, the population was spread out, with 19.2% under the age of 18, 4.5% from 18 to 24, 22.9% from 25 to 44, 29.5% from 45 to 64, and 24.0% who were 65 years of age or older. The median age was 47 years. For every 100 females, there were 82.5 males. For every 100 females age 18 and over, there were 84.4 males.

The median income for a household in the village was $28,654, and the median income for a family was $31,442. Males had a median income of $38,125 versus $22,083 for females. The per capita income for the village was $16,937. About 6.0% of families and 16.9% of the population were below the poverty line, including 6.3% of those under the age of eighteen and 18.0% of those 65 or over.
