= New Burnside, Illinois =

- Village
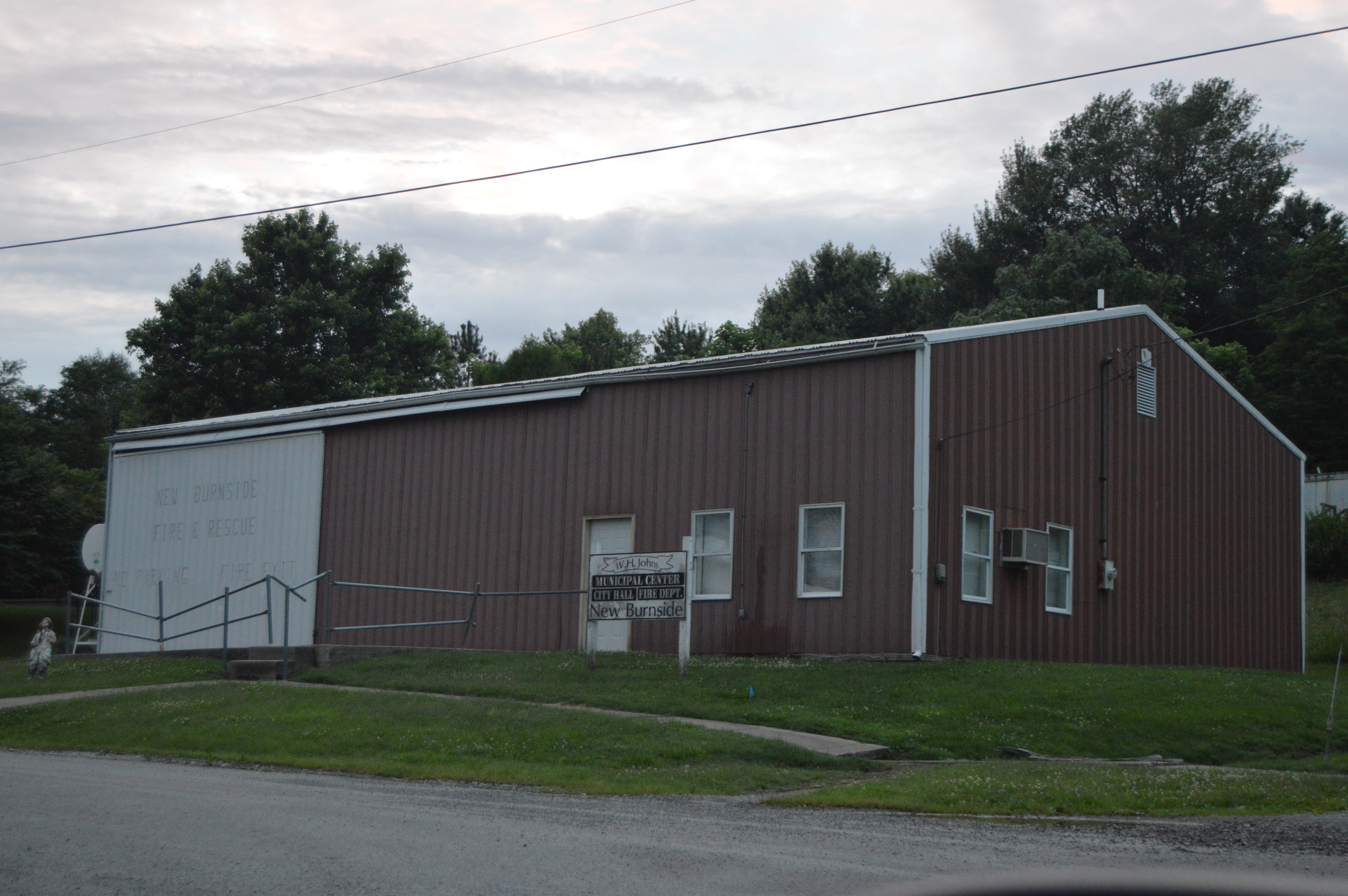
- Village Hall

- Location of New Burnside in Johnson County, Illinois
- Coordinates: 37°34′43″N 88°46′22″W
- Country: United States
- State: Illinois
- County: Johnson

Area
  - Total: 1.05 sq mi (2.73 km^{2})
  - Land: 1.05 sq mi (2.71 km^{2})
  - Water: 0.0077 sq mi (0.02 km^{2})
- Elevation: 545 ft (166 m)

Population (2020)
  - Total: 153
  - Density: 146.5/sq mi (56.55/km^{2})
- Time zone: UTC-6 (CST)
  - Summer (DST): UTC-5 (CDT)
- ZIP code: 62967
- Area code: 618
- FIPS code: 17-52285
- GNIS feature ID: 2399459

New Burnside is a village in Johnson County, Illinois, United States. The population was 153 at the 2020 census.

== History ==
In 1878, New Burnside peaked in population at 1,200 when the railroad ran through the middle of the town. The population decreased gradually after the railroad was abandoned. More recently, the Tunnel Hill State Trail for bicycles was built along the abandoned line. The village was founded in 1872, and was a Cairo and Vincennes Railroad boom-town. Much of its founding was based on the same coal mining industry that grew Harrisburg and Carrier Mills, but slowly turned to an orchard-based economy by 1900. It was named after Civil War general Ambrose Burnside.

== Geography ==
New Burnside is located in northeastern Johnson County. U.S. Route 45 passes through the east side of the village, leading northeast 18 miles (29 km) to Harrisburg and southwest 15 miles (24 km) to Vienna, the Johnson county seat. Illinois Route 166 has its southern terminus at US-45 and leads through the north side of the village. Marion is 19 miles (31 km) to the northwest via Routes 166 and 13.

According to the 2021 census gazetteer files, New Burnside has a total area of 1.05 square miles (2.72 km^{2}), of which 1.05 square miles (2.72 km^{2}) (or 99.24%) is land and 0.01 square miles (0.03 km^{2}) (or 0.76%) is water.

The village is east of the junction of Interstates 24 and 57.

== Demographics ==
Historical population
Census	Pop.	Note	%±
1880	650		—
1890	596		−8.3%
1900	468		−21.5%
1910	369		−21.2%
1920	309		−16.3%
1930	299		−3.2%
1940	299		0.0%
1950	244		−18.4%
1960	227		−7.0%
1970	249		9.7%
1980	276		10.8%
1990	259		−6.2%
2000	242		−6.6%
2010	211		−12.8%
2020	153		−27.5%
U.S. Decennial Census

As of the 2020 census there were 153 people, 64 households, and 48 families residing in the village. The population density was 145.30 inhabitants per square mile (56.10/km^{2}). There were 85 housing units at an average density of 80.72 per square mile (31.17/km^{2}). The racial makeup of the village was 94.77% White, 1.31% African American, 0.00% Native American, 0.00% Asian, 0.00% Pacific Islander, 1.31% from other races, and 2.61% from two or more races. Hispanic or Latino of any race were 0.65% of the population.

There were 64 households, out of which 34.4% had children under the age of 18 living with them, 68.75% were married couples living together, 6.25% had a female householder with no husband present, and 25.00% were non-families. 25.00% of all households were made up of individuals, and 18.75% had someone living alone who was 65 years of age or older. The average household size was 2.42 and the average family size was 2.06.

The village's age distribution consisted of 20.5% under the age of 18, 0.0% from 18 to 24, 13.6% from 25 to 44, 17.5% from 45 to 64, and 48.5% who were 65 years of age or older. The median age was 60.5 years. For every 100 females, there were 73.7 males. For every 100 females age 18 and over, there were 78.0 males.

The median income for a household in the village was $30,909. Males had a median income of $40,000 versus $26,667 for females. The per capita income for the village was $22,992. About 12.5% of families and 17.4% of the population were below the poverty line, including 22.2% of those under age 18 and 15.6% of those age 65 or over.
