= Crab Orchard Community Unit School District 3 =

School district with headquarters in Illinois

Address
- 19189 Bailey St Marion, Illinois, 62959; United States

District information
- Type: Public
- Grades: PreK–12
- NCES District ID: 1711100

Students and staff
- Students: 481

Other information
- Website: www.cocusd3.org

Crab Orchard Community Unit School District 3 is a school district headquartered in Crab Orchard, Illinois. Crab Orchard Community Unit School District #3 serves the community and surrounding area. The district provides classes from Kindergarten to 12th grade. The schools teams have been known as the "Trojans."

It includes the Crab Orchard census-designated place. Even though the district has a Marion postal address, the district does not include any portions of Marion.

== History ==
The high school is an outgrowth of the old private Crab Orchard Academy begun by Professor James W. Turner in 1890 that operated until 1913. A two-year high school began in 1915, a junior year was added in the 1920s, and it became a four-year high school in 1938. School district consolidation led to the creation of the unit district in 1952.

Steve Clark served as superintendent until around 1956. Hubert Fox served as the superintendent and high school principal from circa 1956 until May 1958, when the school board voted to remove him, four members in favor and three against, despite student protests against the firing. The board re-hired Clark as superintendent.

The current grade school building dates to about 1974, and the 7-12 grade building opened in October 2004.

Derek Hutchins began serving as superintendent in 2005. In 2017 the district had 530 enrolled pupils. That year the school faced a cyberattack.

In 2017, U.S. News & World Report recognized Crab Orchard High School in its National Rankings and awarded it a bronze medal.
