= Tunnel Hill State Trail =

State park in Illinois, USA

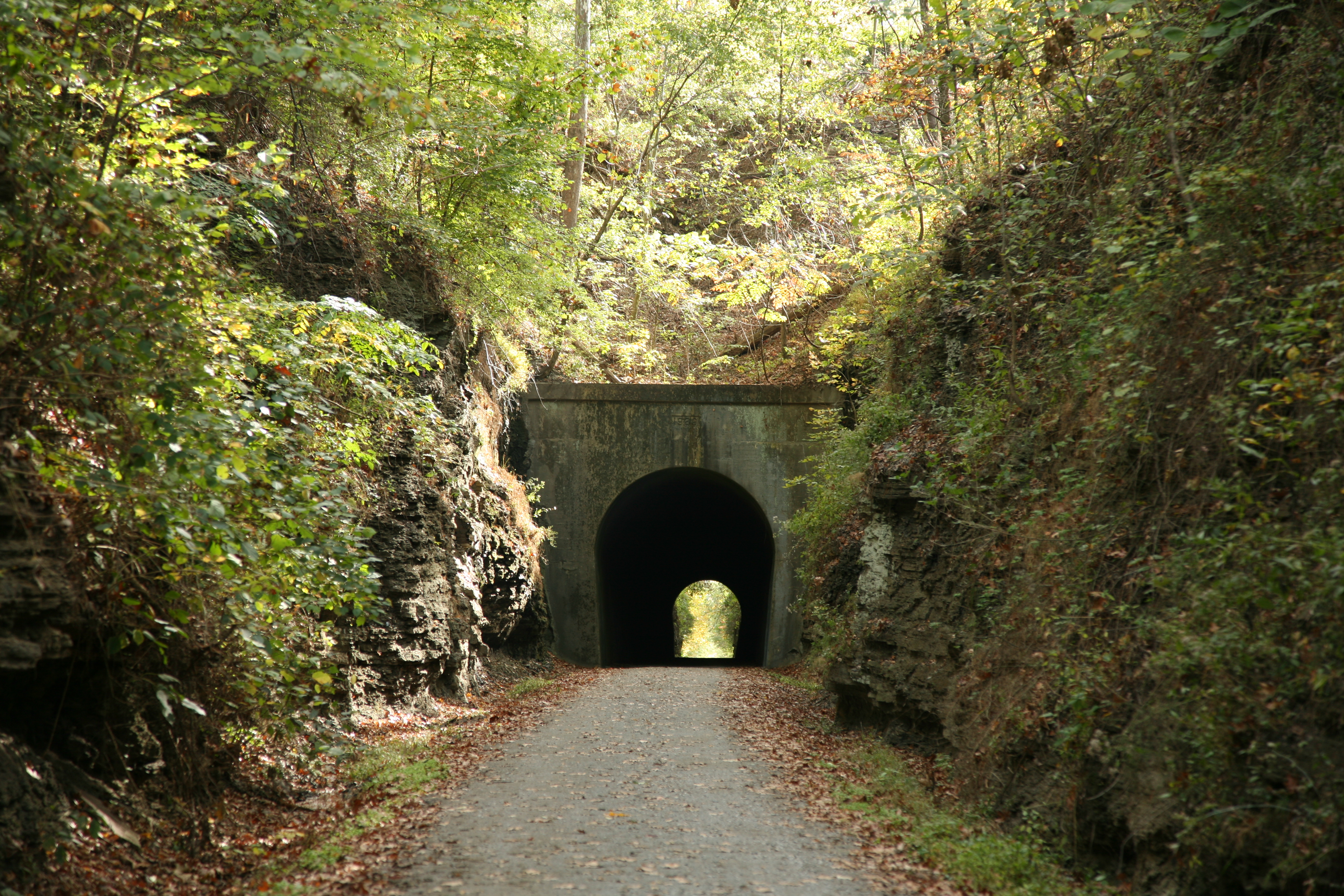
- Tunnel Hill, high point and eponym of the Tunnel Hill State Trail
- Interactive map of Tunnel Hill State Trail
- Location: Johnson, Pulaski, Saline, and Williamson Counties, Illinois, United States
- Nearest city: Vienna, Illinois
- Area: 45 miles (72 km)
- Governing body: Illinois Department of Natural Resources

Tunnel Hill State Trail

The Tunnel Hill State Trail is a bicycle trail running from Eldorado to Karnak, Illinois. The trail runs along the former bed of a part of the Cairo and Vincennes Railroad, a transportation unit led during its early years by Civil War General Ambrose Burnside. The Cairo & Vincennes became a branch line of the Southern Railway before its trail section shut down in the late 1900s.

The northeast end of the trail is in Eldorado, on Trolley Road just north of U.S. Route 45. (). The southwest end of the trail is west of Karnak just off Illinois Route 37 at the Cache river wetlands center ().

The trail connects to several trails including the River to River Trail; the Illinois southern route of the American Discovery Trail; the U.S. Bicycle Route 76 (part of the TransAmerica Bike Route); and the Trail of Tears National Historic Trail.

The trail is 55 miles (89 km) long. The trail is suitable for both hiking and gravel cycling. The trail surface is crushed limestone. During the summer, the surface is hard packed and easily ridden on a road bicycle. However, at other times of the year, the trail may be soft and is better navigated on a gravel bike, mountain bike or hybrid.

Parking is available at several locations. (Vienna, Karnak, Cache river center, Tunnel Hill, New Burnside, Stonefort, Carrier Mills, Harrisburg, and Eldorado) However, full services (restaurants, lodging, groceries) are only available in Harrisburg, Carrier Mills, and Vienna. There are limited services elsewhere along the trail. (Soda machines in Stonefort and Karnak)
