= Metro Lakeland =

Area of Southern Illinois, United States

Coordinates: 37°40′N 89°0′W

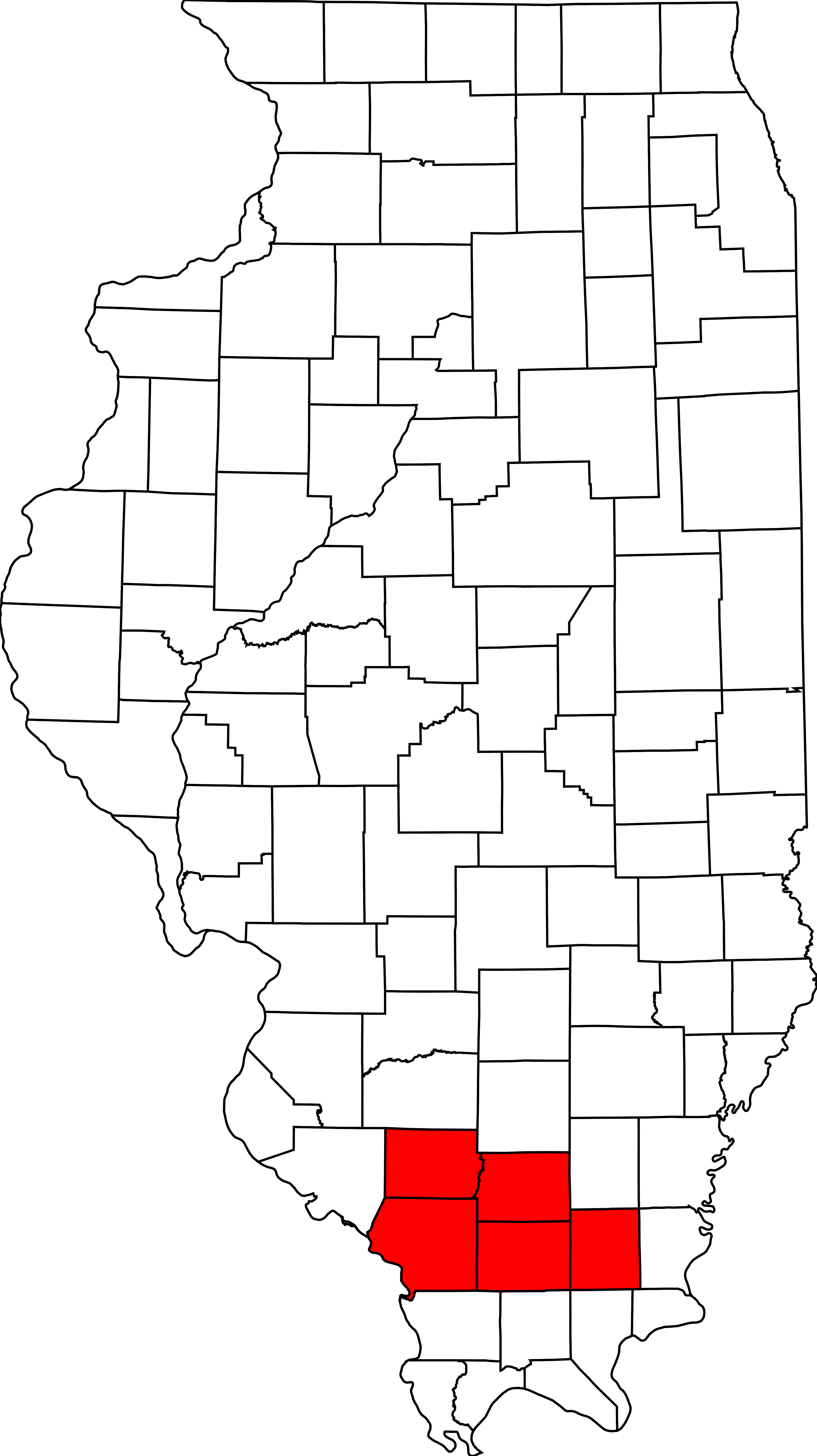
Map of Illinois highlighting the Metro Lakeland region

Metro Lakeland is a name that was coined in the 1960s for an area of southern Illinois that is centered on the intersections of Interstate 57, Interstate 24, and Illinois Route 13—a four-lane east-west highway connecting the communities of Murphysboro, Carbondale, Carterville, Herrin, Marion, and Harrisburg. Metro Lakeland was defined as Jackson, Williamson, Franklin, Saline, and Perry counties, with a combined population of approximately 210,000. Carbondale, Herrin, and Marion are the key urban areas, with a combined city-proper population of over 65,000 (2007 Census estimate) Carbondale, the site of Southern Illinois University, is the region's largest city. Metro Lakeland is about 88 miles (142 km) southeast of St. Louis, Missouri, or 120 miles (190 km) by Interstate highway.

== Origin of name ==
The name "Metro Lakeland" refers to the abundance of lakes in the area, most of them engineered. The name appeared to have been coined to promote economic development and tourism in the region, but it is not widely used by residents, nor by local news media, such as The Southern Illinoisan newspaper (Carbondale) or WSIL-TV (Harrisburg). It does not appear in official listings of the U.S. Census Bureau or of the U.S. Office of Management and Budget (the agency charged with defining metropolitan and "micropolitan" statistical areas in the United States). (These agencies refer only to Lakeland, Florida.)

== History ==
Arthur E. Prell, director of the Bureau of Business Research at Southern Illinois University at Carbondale, started studying the concept developing Jackson, Williamson, Franklin and Perry counties as a single metropolitan complex in 1963. At the time, the four-county region would contain a population of 119,000.

He outlined his plan to the West Frankfort Chamber of Commerce's annual dinner on 18 February 1966. He explained the theory behind his idea was the "micro-multiplex" in which "small socio-economic units cooperate for general economic opportunities of the entire area." To work, Prell called for a common tax base, common sewage system, joint police and fire protection as well as a common telephone system. New roads would need to be created including an inner and outer belt. Zoning as well would need to be added and new recreational lands placed between the towns.

By April 1966, other SIU professors had chimed in support of the project. Fremont Shull Jr., chairman of the management department argued, "There is a great deal of community isolation and fragmentation in Southern Illinois, which is simply not good business. The entire region must begin to look at itself as a megalopolis. The future economic health of the area depends on it.

By mid July Prell told area business leaders that Herrin was the "hub of Metro-Lakeland" which he had dubbed to then contain 140,000 residents. Herrin, he said, had the best chance at becoming the strongest downtown business district in Southern Illinois. He even proposed a land clearance program in the central business district so a shopping mall be built in the 100 blocks of East and West Cherry Street and 200 block of North Park Avenue in Herrin that was then, and still is, the alignment for Illinois Route 148.

On 6 December 1967, Prell took the proposal before the Illinois Commission on Economic Development, chaired by Sen. Arthur Gottschalk, R-Flossmoor, who called it, "a very exciting concept". Prell told the commission the merger of the four counties would create the 151st largest metropolitan area in the United States. "let's start the first totally new city in the Midwest and create a showplace for the entire country." Prell admitted the project would require substantial spending and major governmental reorganization. Supporters testifying on behalf of the proposal included Geoffrey Hughes, executive director of Southern Illinois Incorporated. He claimed that for 20 years SII had been "proclaiming that this part of Illinois is a dispersed large city with nearly a quarter million people experiencing the same common problems and seeking area-wide cures and solutions." Oren Drew, chairman of the Southern Illinois Recreation Council, an early regional tourism promotional council, called for additional state and federal assistance, "as well as private development of our recreational assets." Other persons testifying included Robert Feigenbaum of DuQuoin, Illinois-based Turco Manufacturing Co., Allen Y. Baker, chairman of the Greater Egypt Regional Planning and Development Commission; Russell Davis of the Southern Illinois Bankers Association; James Gillooly, project coordinator for the 14-county Shawnee Resource Conversation and Development Project; African-American leader Robert Stalls of Carbondale; Carl Taylor of the Southern Illinois Business Agents Council representing labor and John Rendleman, SIU vice president for business affairs. Other than Carbondale Mayor David Keene who welcomed the commission to his city, tellingly, no other local elected official was mentioned as testifying in favor of the merger.

Later that month Prell continued his push for consolidation of school districts, boards and public health units. Long-distance calls between communities within Metro Lakeland would be eliminated. "Utilities would have to reconstruct their concept of the area. How many of you would tolerate a long-distance toll within the city of Springfield."

On 26 January 1968, Prell and the regional newspaper, the Southern Illinoisan, released a map showing exactly what territory they proposed to merge. The Oregon-shaped area would include 873 square miles (2,260 km^{2}) and about 131,000 people formed out of 21 townships and road districts, 48 municipalities and other taxing bodies. Major cities inside would be Carbondale, Murphysboro, Herrin, Marion, Benton, West Frankfort, DuQuoin and "probably Pinckneyville." In the article Prell outlined a multi-step approach to the eventual consolidation.

In none of the stories presented by the paper, did their reporters ask any elected mayors their opinions of the plan. Not surprisingly, nothing more is found in the pages of the paper over the next decade except a reference to Prell's idea in a 1970 column written, not surprisingly, by another SIU faculty member.

== Counties ==
- Jackson
- Williamson
- Saline
- Franklin
- Perry

== Major cities ==
Note: Anchor Cities are bolded.

=== 25,000+ ===
- **Carbondale**

=== 10,000-24,999 ===
- **Harrisburg**
- **Herrin**
- **Marion**
- **Murphysboro**
- West Frankfort

=== <10,000 ===
- Benton
- Carterville
- DuQuoin
- Eldorado
- Johnston City
- Pinckneyville

== Transportation ==
=== Transit ===
==== Local ====
- Jackson County Mass Transit District
- Rides Mass Transit District
- Saluki Express
- South Central Illinois Mass Transit District

==== Intercity ====
- Amtrak at Carbondale station
- Greyhound Lines

=== Highways ===
- Interstate 24
- Interstate 57
- U.S. Route 45
- U.S. Route 51
- Illinois Route 3
- Illinois Route 4
- Illinois Route 13
- Illinois Route 14
- Illinois Route 34
- Illinois Route 37
- Illinois Route 127
- Illinois Route 142
- Illinois Route 145
- Illinois Route 148
- Illinois Route 149
- Illinois Route 151
- Illinois Route 152
- Illinois Route 154
- Illinois Route 166
- Illinois Route 184
