= Corinth, Illinois =

- Unincorporated community
- Location within Illinois Location within the United States
- Coordinates: 37°49′08″N 88°46′35″W
- Country: United States
- State: Illinois
- County: Williamson
- Elevation: 518 ft (158 m)
- Time zone: UTC-6 (Central (CST))
  - Summer (DST): UTC-5 (CDT)
- ZIP Code: 62890
- Area code: 618
- GNIS feature ID: 406585

Corinth is an unincorporated community in Williamson County, Illinois, United States. Corinth is 8 miles (13 km) east of Johnston City. It is located in the north side of Section 21, Township 8 South, Range 4 East of the Third Principal Meridian, at the crossroads of Corinth Road and Paulton/Thompsonville Roads.

== History ==
Originally Roberts' Prairie and Roberts' Settlement. A post office was established 16 August 1864 and discontinued operations on 15 June 1911. The area is now served by the post office at Thompsonville, Illinois.
