= Crab Orchard, Illinois =

Crab Orchard
- Census-designated place
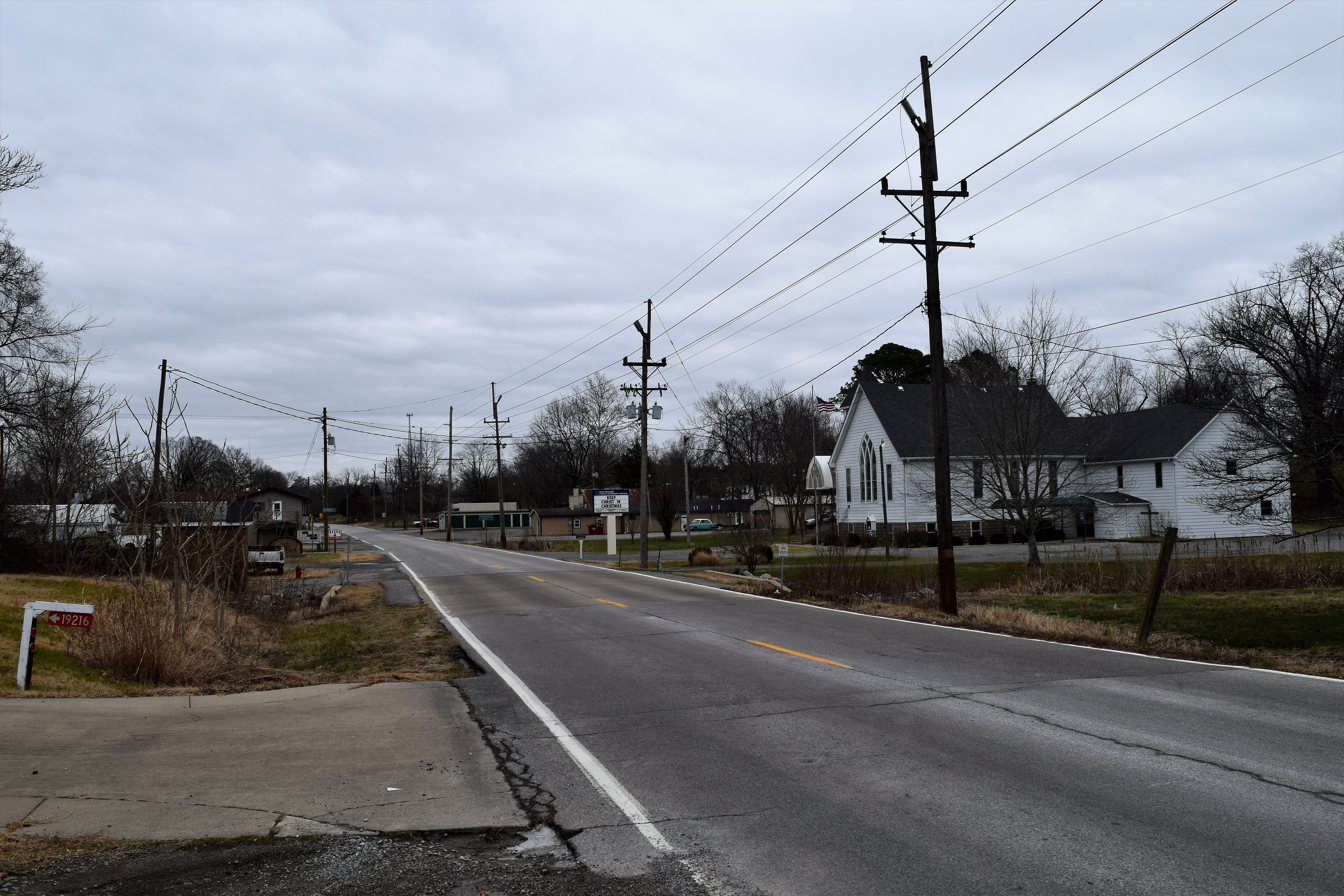
- Main road through Crab Orchard

- Location of Crab Orchard in Williamson County, Illinois.

- Location of Crab Orchard within Illinois
- Coordinates: 37°43′45″N 88°48′15″W
- Country: United States
- State: Illinois
- County: Williamson

Area
  - Total: 1.43 sq mi (3.70 km^{2})
  - Land: 1.39 sq mi (3.61 km^{2})
  - Water: 0.035 sq mi (0.09 km^{2})
- Elevation: 515 ft (157 m)

Population (2020)
  - Total: 356
  - Density: 255/sq mi (98.5/km^{2})
- Time zone: UTC-6 (CST)
  - Summer (DST): UTC-5 (CDT)
- ZIP Code: 62959
- Area code: 618
- FIPS code: 17-17094
- GNIS feature ID: 2628548

Crab Orchard is an unincorporated census-designated place east of Marion in Williamson County, Illinois, located along an old route of Illinois Route 13 now designated Crab Orchard Road. The upper branches of Crab Orchard Creek which eventually feed into Crab Orchard Lake flow nearby and gave the community its name. For a brief time during the Civil War, it was known as Erwinsville, which is the name in the original plat of the village. In its early days, it had the nickname "Steal-Easy." The Crab Orchard post office was established 18 August 1853 and discontinued operations 15 May 1924. It's now served by the Marion post office. As of the 2020 census, Crab Orchard had a population of 356. Crab Orchard has an area of 1.430 square miles (3.70 km^{2}); 1.395 square miles (3.61 km^{2}) of this is land, and 0.035 square miles (0.091 km^{2}) is water.

== Demographics ==
Historical population
Census	Pop.	Note	%±
2020	356		—
U.S. Decennial Census

== Community services ==
Crab Orchard Community Unit School District 3 serves the community and surrounding area.

The Crab Orchard Public Library District serves the area with its main library in Crab Orchard and satellite services at Pittsburg and Creal Springs.

Fire protection is provided by Williamson County Fire Protection District. Station #3 is located on the north edge of the community. Treated water is provided by the private Coal Valley Water District.

== Notable people ==
- Cory Bailey, professional baseball player, attended school in Crab Orchard.
- Gerry Glasco, college softball coach at Louisiana and former head coach at the USSSA Pride and the Scrap Yard Dawgs of the National Pro Fastpitch
