= Whiteash, Illinois =

Whiteash
- Census-designated place
- Location of Whiteash in Williamson County, Illinois.

- Location of Whiteash within Illinois
- Coordinates: 37°47′18″N 88°55′35″W
- Country: United States
- State: Illinois
- County: Williamson

Area
  - Total: 0.90 sq mi (2.32 km^{2})
  - Land: 0.87 sq mi (2.25 km^{2})
  - Water: 0.027 sq mi (0.07 km^{2})
- Elevation: 443 ft (135 m)

Population (2020)
  - Total: 279
  - Density: 320.5/sq mi (123.73/km^{2})
- Time zone: UTC-6 (CST)
  - Summer (DST): UTC-5 (CDT)
- ZIP Code: 62959
- Area code: 618
- FIPS code: 17-81165
- GNIS feature ID: 2771129

Whiteash is a Census designated place in Williamson County, Illinois, United States. As of the 2020 census, Whiteash had a population of 279. This village dissolved in 2014.

== History ==
Whiteash began as a coal mining community around the Chicago and Marion Coal Company's mine organized by Charles A. Gent of nearby Marion, Illinois. In 1903, Gent bought the site of the village from Samuel K. Casey, publisher of the Egyptian Press newspaper also of Marion. He in turn had inherited it from his grandfather George W. Binkley who had homesteaded the land and entered it with the government in 1837. Gent platted the village on July 3, 1903, in the northwest corner of Section 31, Township 8 South, Range 3 East of the Third Principal Meridian, also known as Lake Creek Precinct. He named the town Whiteash after the trade name he used for the coal his mine produced.

A post office opened there on February 29, 1904, with Robert T. Payne as postmaster. Residents incorporated the village the following year on June 16, 1905. The mine operated until 1922 when it filled with water and was abandoned. Mail service continued for another decade or so, finally closing on November 30, 1934. The population in 1960 was 160.

== Geography ==
Whiteash is located at 37°47′18″N 88°55′35″W (37.788300, -88.926450).

According to the 2010 census, Whiteash has a total area of 0.884 square miles (2.29 km^{2}), of which 0.86 square miles (2.23 km^{2}) (or 97.29%) is land and 0.024 square miles (0.06 km^{2}) (or 2.71%) is water.

== Demographics ==
Historical population
Census	Pop.	Note	%±
1910	353		—
1920	381		7.9%
1930	237		−37.8%
1940	206		−13.1%
1950	204		−1.0%
1960	160		−21.6%
1970	181		13.1%
1980	268		48.1%
1990	249		−7.1%
2000	268		7.6%
2010	241		−10.1%
2020	279		15.8%
U.S. Census

As of the census of 2000, there were 268 people, 114 households, and 80 families residing in the village. The population density was 308.1 inhabitants per square mile (119.0/km^{2}). There were 121 housing units at an average density of 139.1 per square mile (53.7/km^{2}). The racial makeup of the village was 97.01% White, 0.75% African American and 2.24% Native American. Hispanic or Latino of any race were 1.12% of the population.

There were 114 households, out of which 31.6% had children under the age of 18 living with them, 53.5% were married couples living together, 12.3% had a female householder with no husband present, and 29.8% were non-families. 27.2% of all households were made up of individuals, and 14.9% had someone living alone who was 65 years of age or older. The average household size was 2.35 and the average family size was 2.83.

In the village, the population was spread out, with 23.1% under the age of 18, 8.2% from 18 to 24, 29.5% from 25 to 44, 23.9% from 45 to 64, and 15.3% who were 65 years of age or older. The median age was 39 years. For every 100 females, there were 92.8 males. For every 100 females age 18 and over, there were 90.7 males.

The median income for a household in the village was $24,167, and the median income for a family was $28,000. Males had a median income of $25,972 versus $15,938 for females. The per capita income for the village was $11,780. About 22.1% of families and 23.3% of the population were below the poverty line, including 35.2% of those under the age of eighteen and 14.7% of those 65 or over.
