= Hurst, Illinois =

- City
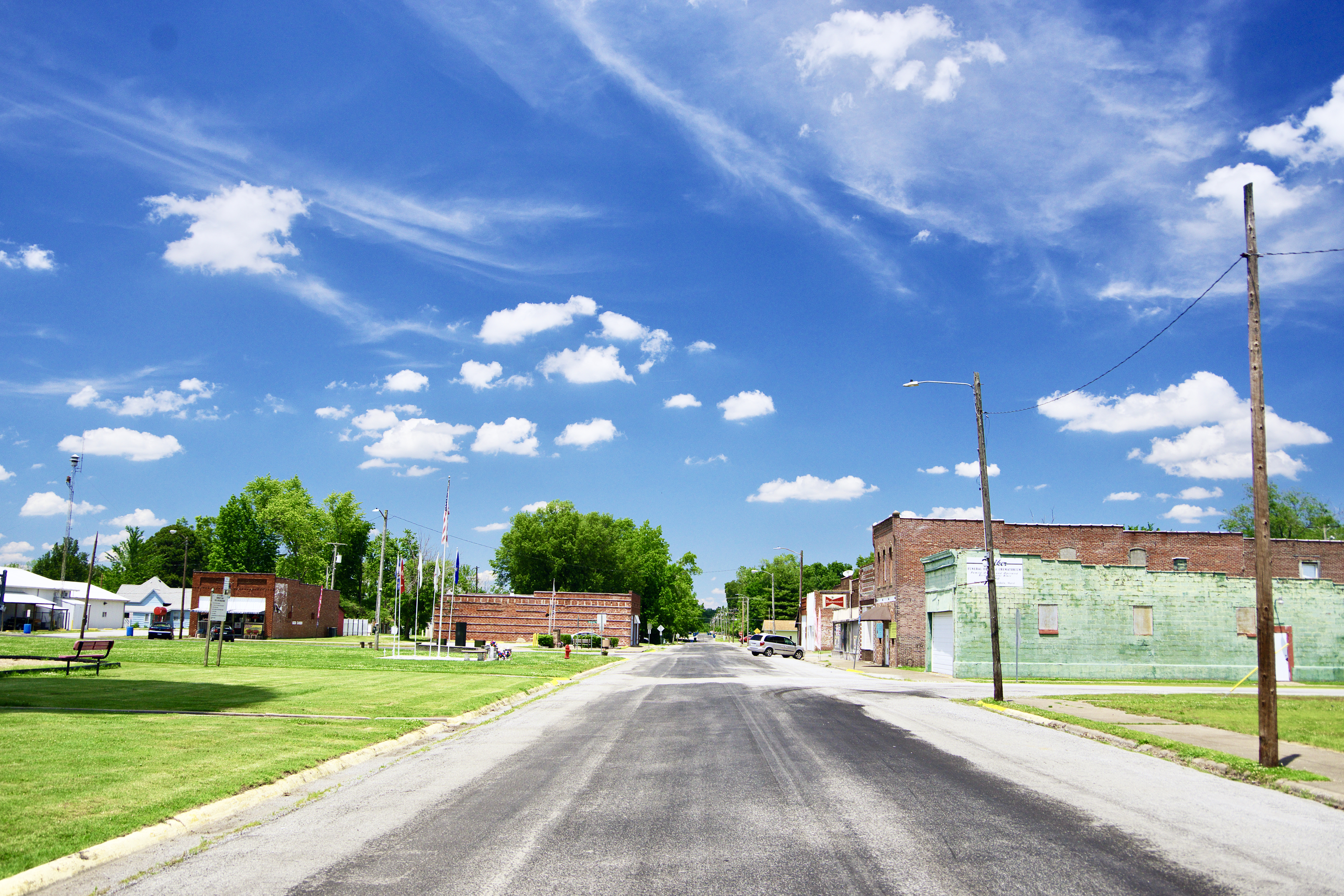
- Bush Avenue

- Location of Hurst in Williamson County, Illinois.
- Coordinates: 37°50′06″N 89°08′40″W
- Country: United States
- State: Illinois
- County: Williamson
- Founded: 1903

Area
  - Total: 0.89 sq mi (2.31 km^{2})
  - Land: 0.89 sq mi (2.30 km^{2})
  - Water: 0.0077 sq mi (0.02 km^{2})
- Elevation: 394 ft (120 m)

Population (2020)
  - Total: 764
  - Density: 861.7/sq mi (332.72/km^{2})
- Time zone: UTC-6 (CST)
  - Summer (DST): UTC-5 (CDT)
- ZIP Code: 62949
- Area code: 618
- FIPS code: 17-36815
- GNIS feature ID: 2394459

Hurst is a city in Williamson County, Illinois, United States. As of the 2020 census, Hurst had a population of 764.

== History ==
Hurst was founded in 1903 as a stop along the St. Louis, Iron Mountain and Southern Railway, which had extended a line to the area from De Soto. Thomas Philip Russell, who donated some of the land for the new city, initially sought to name it after his family, but the name "Russell" was already in use elsewhere in Illinois. He then agreed to name it after his friend, William Charles Hurst, a railroad official who had stayed at his house during visits to the area.

== Geography ==
According to the 2010 census, Hurst has a total area of 0.862 square miles (2.23 km^{2}), of which 0.86 square miles (2.23 km^{2}) (or 99.77%) is land and 0.002 square miles (0.01 km^{2}) (or 0.23%) is water.

== Demographics ==
Historical population
Census	Pop.	Note	%±
1910	325		—
1920	1,222		276.0%
1930	1,123		−8.1%
1940	1,012		−9.9%
1950	858		−15.2%
1960	863		0.6%
1970	934		8.2%
1980	938		0.4%
1990	842		−10.2%
2000	805		−4.4%
2010	795		−1.2%
2020	764		−3.9%
U.S. Census

As of the census of 2000, there were 805 people, 360 households, and 217 families residing in the city. The population density was 935.1 inhabitants per square mile (361.0/km^{2}). There were 386 housing units at an average density of 448.4 per square mile (173.1/km^{2}). The racial makeup of the city was 97.27% White, 0.99% African American, 0.12% Native American, 0.87% from other races, and 0.75% from two or more races. Hispanic or Latino of any race were 1.24% of the population.

There were 360 households, out of which 29.2% had children under the age of 18 living with them, 41.9% were married couples living together, 12.5% had a female householder with no husband present, and 39.7% were non-families. 36.1% of all households were made up of individuals, and 17.5% had someone living alone who was 65 years of age or older. The average household size was 2.24 and the average family size was 2.89.

In the city, the population was spread out, with 24.1% under the age of 18, 8.9% from 18 to 24, 29.1% from 25 to 44, 23.9% from 45 to 64, and 14.0% who were 65 years of age or older. The median age was 36 years. For every 100 females, there were 88.5 males. For every 100 females age 18 and over, there were 80.8 males.

The median income for a household in the city was $21,765, and the median income for a family was $30,250. Males had a median income of $24,659 versus $18,393 for females. The per capita income for the city was $12,583. About 18.7% of families and 24.8% of the population were below the poverty line, including 38.9% of those under age 18 and 14.8% of those age 65 or over.

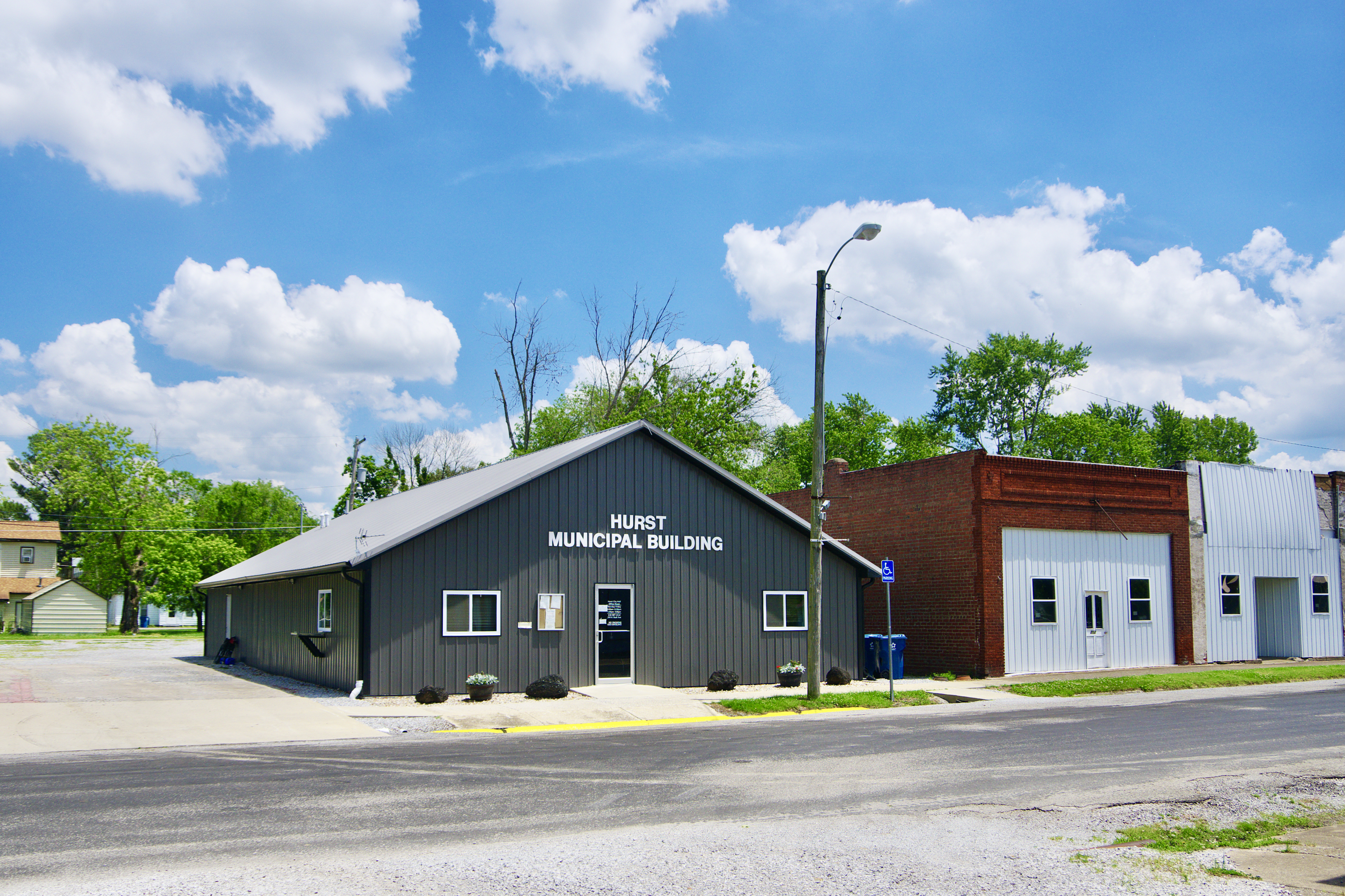
Hurst Municipal Building

== Emergency services ==
The Hurst Fire Chief is Tom Gottschalk and the ambulance director is Gregory Parker. The fire and ambulance services are both fully volunteer organizations.

== Education and religion ==
Hurst has one church in the community: a Christian church located on Russell Street. After the closing of the Hurst-Bush Community Grade School in 1996 and the community high school in 1966, Hurst citizens attend Herrin Unit 4 schools.
