= Illinois Route 166 =

State highway in southern Illinois, US

Illinois Route 166
- IL 166 highlighted in red

Route information
- Maintained by IDOT
- Length: 14.43 mi (23.22 km)
- Existed: 1924–present

Major junctions
- South end: US 45 in New Burnside
- North end: IL 13 in Pittsburg

Location
- Country: United States
- State: Illinois
- Counties: Johnson, Williamson

Highway system
- Illinois State Highway System; Interstate; US; State; Tollways; Scenic
← IL 165	→ IL 167

Illinois Route 166 (IL 166) is a 14.43-mile-long (23.22 km) north–south state road in southern Illinois, United States. The route runs from its southern terminus at U.S. Route 45 in New Burnside to its northern terminus at Illinois Route 13 east of Marion. Route 166 serves the counties of Johnson and Williamson. It is maintained by the Illinois Department of Transportation (IDOT).

== Route description ==
Route 166 begins at a 3-way intersection with U.S. Route 45 on the east side of New Burnside. The route heads north from New Burnside, passing through rural Johnson County before crossing into Williamson County. In Williamson County, the highway turns west and passes through Creal Springs. Route 166 turns north after passing through Creal Springs and continues through farmland until it reaches its northern terminus at a traffic light-controlled intersection with Illinois 13, a four-lane divided highway. Illinois 166 is an undivided two-lane road for its entire length.

== History ==
A road connecting Marion to New Burnside was first marked on Illinois highway maps in 1922. Route 166 was designated along its current route in 1924 as a paved road 9 feet (2.7 m) wide connecting New Burnside and Creal Springs. The route was first marked between Route 13 and Creal Springs on the 1929 state highway map; at this point, it had not been paved. By 1931, Route 166 was completed to New Burnside and paved between Route 13 and Caneyville, a community north of Creal Springs. The 1931 map marked the route as Illinois Route 156 in error. The remainder of the route was paved by 1934.

== Major intersections ==
County	Location	mi	km	Destinations	Notes
Johnson	New Burnside	0.0	0.0	US 45	
Williamson		14.4	23.2	IL 13	
1.000 mi = 1.609 km; 1.000 km = 0.621 mi
