= Colp, Illinois =

Colp
- Village
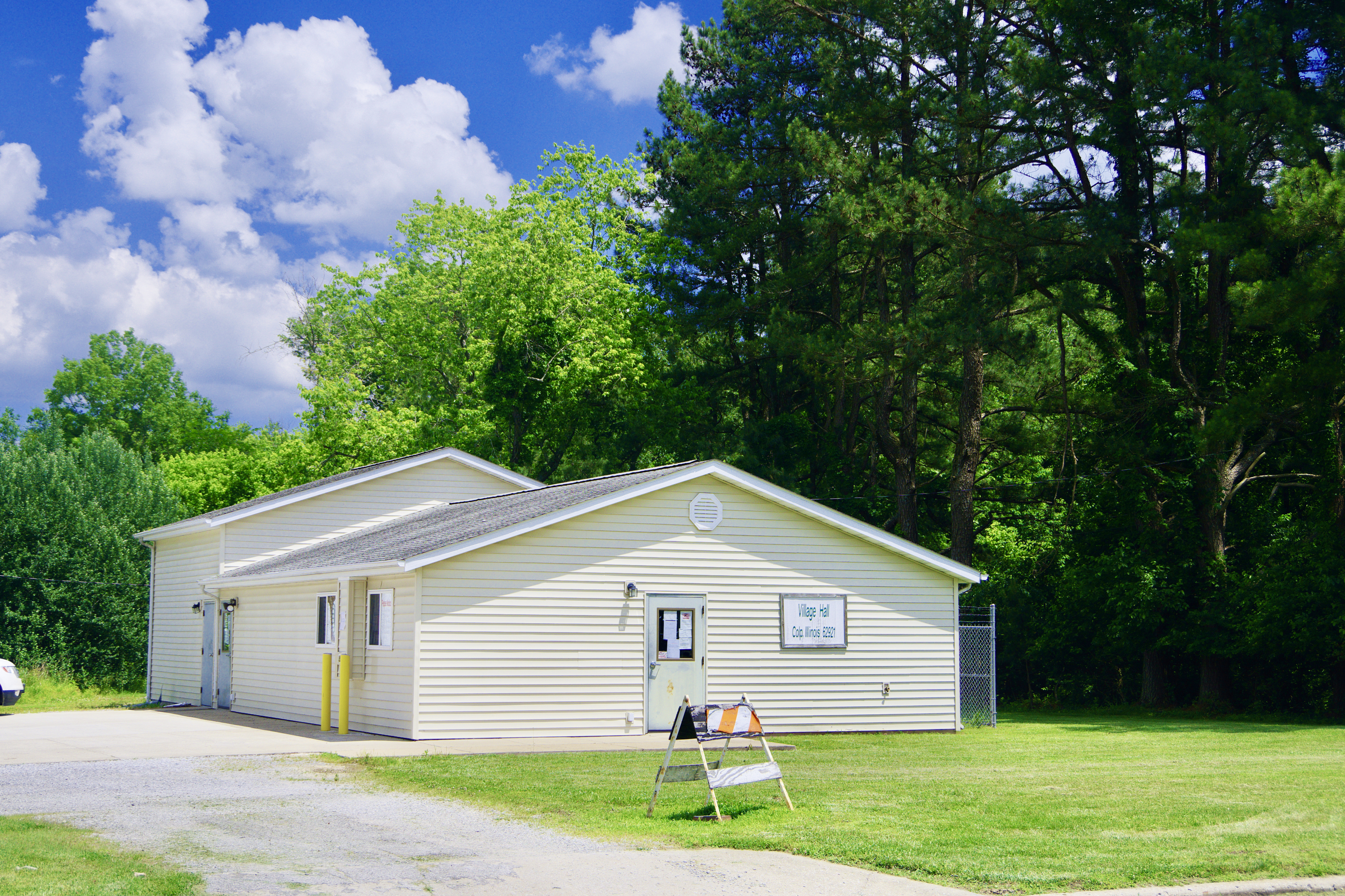
- Village Hall

- Location of Colp in Williamson County, Illinois.

- Location of Illinois in the United States
- Coordinates: 37°48′21″N 89°4′45″W
- Country: United States
- State: Illinois
- County: Williamson

Area
  - Total: 0.14 sq mi (0.35 km^{2})
  - Land: 0.14 sq mi (0.35 km^{2})
  - Water: 0 sq mi (0.00 km^{2})
- Elevation: 394 ft (120 m)

Population (2020)
  - Total: 168
  - Density: 1,252.4/sq mi (483.57/km^{2})
- Time zone: UTC-6 (CST)
  - Summer (DST): UTC-5 (CDT)
- ZIP Code: 62921
- Area code: 618
- FIPS code: 17-15807
- GNIS feature ID: 2398603
- Wikimedia Commons: Colp, Illinois
- Website: colp.municipalimpact.com

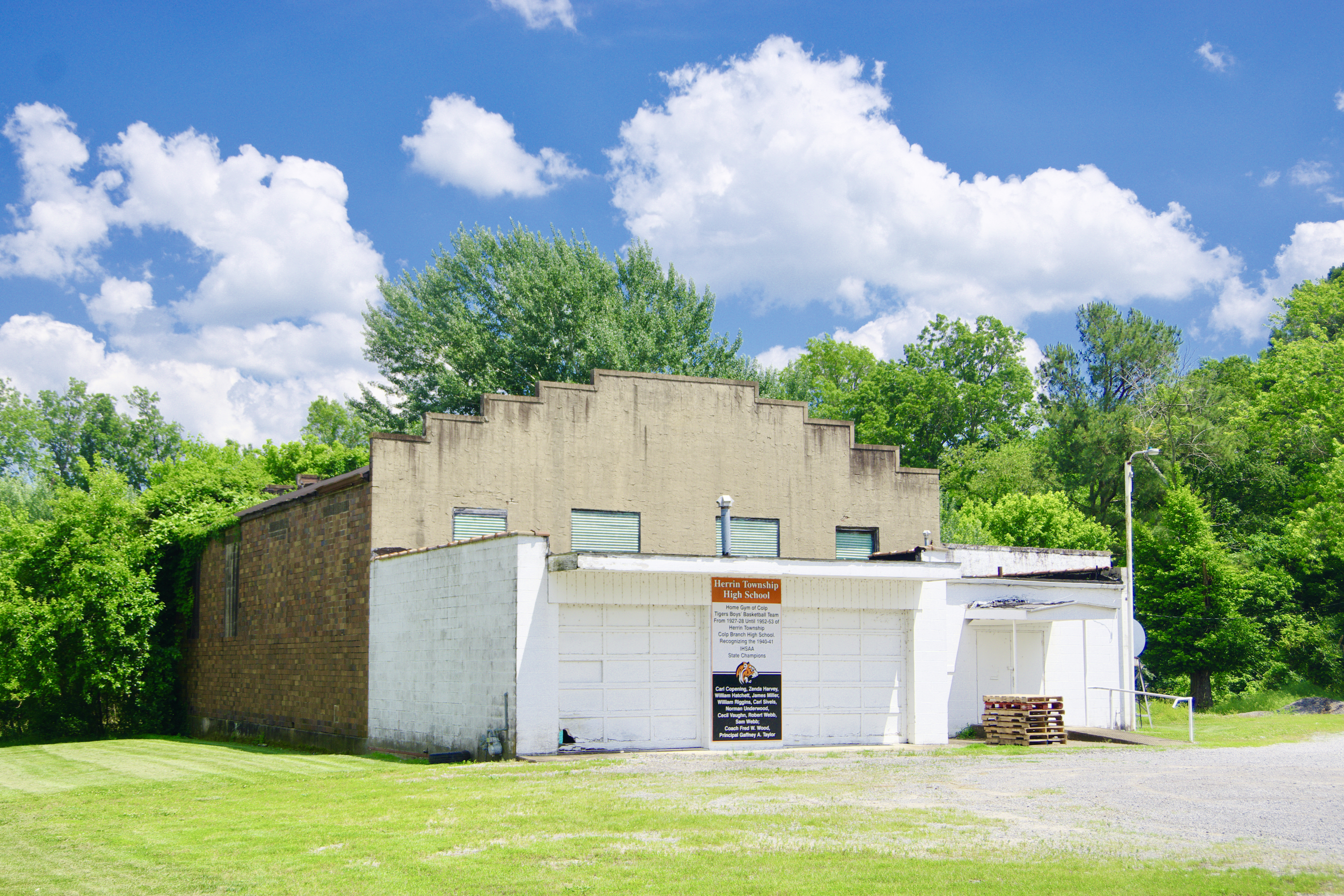
Gym at the segregated school for blacks in Colp (2021)

Colp is a village in Williamson County, Illinois, United States. As of the 2020 census, Colp had a population of 168. A mining town, it had segregated schools including a high school for African Americans in Herrin Township that won a state championship in 1941. It competed on the Southern Illinois Conference of Colored Schools. The school closed in 1953 in the wake of integration. Its gym was demolished in 2025.

== History ==
Colp was established in the early 1900s and named for John Colp (1849–1920), whose mining company opened a mine in the area in 1901. The Illinois Central Railroad extended a line to the mine in 1904. The village incorporated in 1915. The village was inhabited by eastern European immigrants who worked in the mines, including Rusyns.

Colp mayor Frank Caliper was one of the state's longest-serving elected officials. He served 52 years as mayor from 1935 until his death on March 28, 1987.

== Mining ==
Several companies established coal mines in Colp:

- Colp Coal Company
- Pittsburg and Big Muddy Coal Company (purchased the Colp Coal Company in 1918)
- Ernest Coal Company
- Cosgrove-Meehan Coal Company

== Geography ==
Colp is located at 37°48′21″N 89°04′45″W.

According to the 2010 census, Colp has a total area of 0.14 square miles (0.36 km^{2}), all land.

== Demographics ==
Historical population
Census	Pop.	Note	%±
1920	584		—
1930	1,250		114.0%
1940	323		−74.2%
1950	253		−21.7%
1960	201		−20.6%
1970	271		34.8%
1980	278		2.6%
1990	235		−15.5%
2000	224		−4.7%
2010	225		0.4%
2020	168		−25.3%
U.S. Census

At the 2020 census, the village had a population of 168 people, with 95 households and 94 families residing in the village. The population density was 1,576.4 inhabitants per square mile (608.7/km^{2}). There were 112 housing units at an average density of 788.2 per square mile (304.3/km^{2}). The racial makeup of the village was 76.34% White, 21.43% African American, 0.89% Native American, 0.45% from other races, and 0.89% from two or more races.

There were 103 households, of which 23.3% had children under the age of 18 living with them, 40.8% were married couples living together, 15.5% had a female householder with no husband present, and 40.8% were non-families. 33.0% of all households were made up of individuals, and 12.6% had someone living alone who was 65 years of age or older. The average household size was 2.17 and the average family size was 2.75.

Age distribution was 22.8% under the age of 18, 10.3% from 18 to 24, 26.8% from 25 to 44, 21.9% from 45 to 64, and 18.3% who were 65 years of age or older. The median age was 38 years. For every 100 females, there were 89.8 males. For every 100 females age 18 and over, there were 86.0 males.

The median household income was $14,722, and the median family income was $14,286. Males had a median income of $26,250 versus $11,875 for females. The per capita income for the village was $13,769. About 44.8% of families and 37.6% of the population were below the poverty line, including 53.3% of those under the age of eighteen and 25.0% of those 65 or over.
