= Creal Springs, Illinois =

Creal Springs
- City
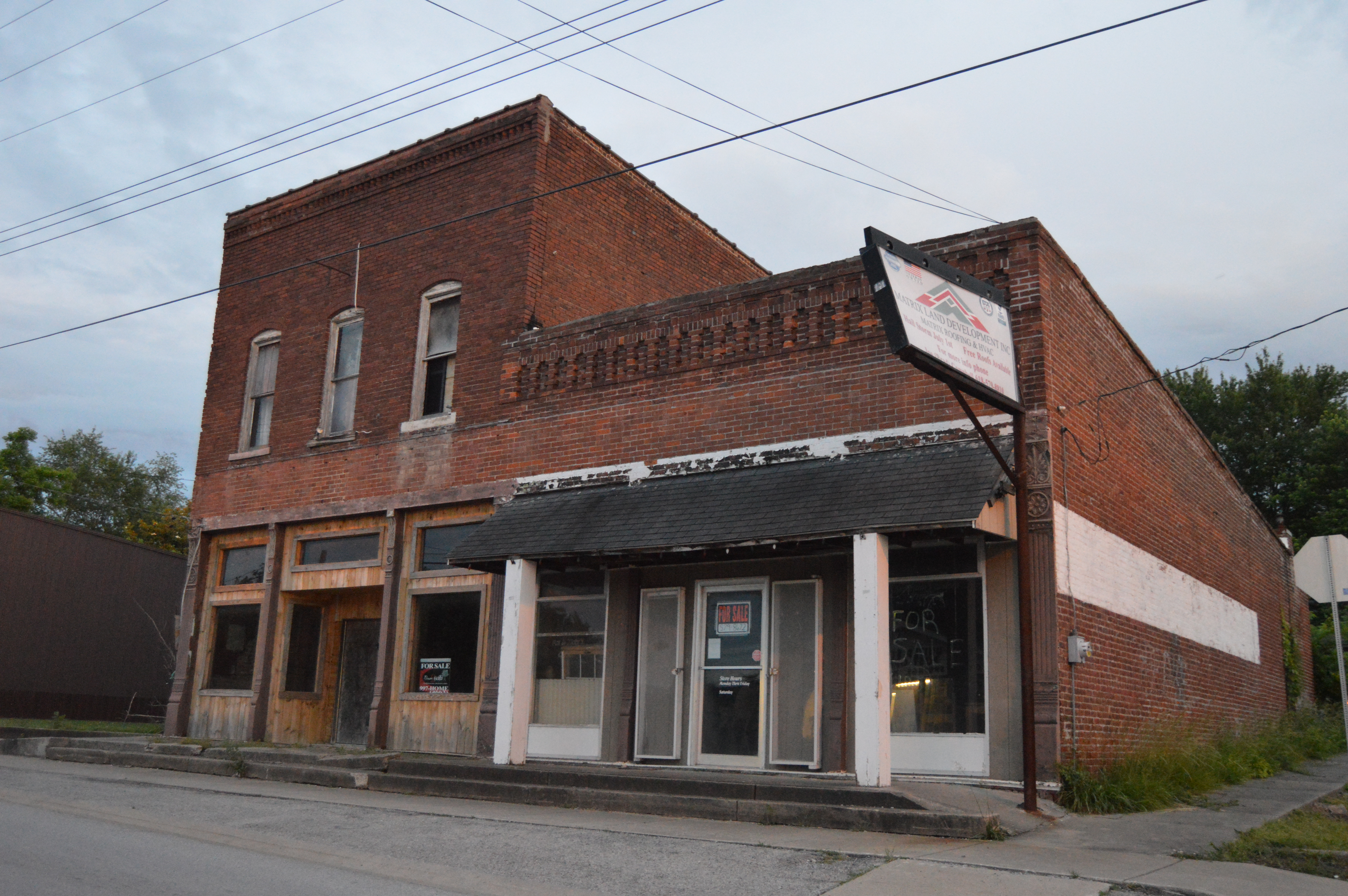
- Blue Avenue

- Location of Creal Springs in Williamson County, Illinois.
- Coordinates: 37°37′23″N 88°50′12″W
- Country: United States
- State: Illinois
- County: Williamson

Area
  - Total: 1.03 sq mi (2.67 km^{2})
  - Land: 1.03 sq mi (2.66 km^{2})
  - Water: 0.0039 sq mi (0.01 km^{2})
- Elevation: 505 ft (154 m)

Population (2020)
  - Total: 505
  - Density: 491.5/sq mi (189.77/km^{2})
- Time zone: UTC-6 (CST)
  - Summer (DST): UTC-5 (CDT)
- ZIP code: 62922
- Area code: 618
- FIPS code: 17-17289
- GNIS feature ID: 2393666
- Website: www.cityofcrealsprings.com

Creal Springs is a city in Williamson County, Illinois, United States. As of the 2020 census, Creal Springs had a population of 505.

== History ==
In the early 19th century, Lusk's Ferry Road was an important road that connected Fort Kaskaskia with Lusk's Ferry on the Ohio River. The original survey maps of Illinois show a short segment of this road south of Creal Springs, in Johnson County. This old road most likely ran from Marion through Creal Springs before ascending to the summit of the Shawnee Hills. The modern road running toward the southeast into Creal Springs may be the old road. The road leading south out of Creal Springs toward Lake of Egypt links into the Wagon Creek Road, which leads to the segment mapped in the original survey. Modern maps also show traces of an older road that ran south out of Creal Springs along a less direct line.

The route south out of Creal Springs lead to a difficult passage over the Shawnee Summit. There was an easier, though longer, zigzag route east to New Burnside, southwest along modern U.S. Highway 45, and then back east to Reynoldsburg. Creal Springs may at one time have served as the junction of these alternative routes.

From 1884 to 1916, Creal Springs was the home of the Creal Springs Seminary, later the Creal Springs College and Conservatory of Music, which provided education at the preparatory, baccalaureate and master's levels.

== Geography ==
According to the 2010 census, Creal Springs has a total area of 0.996 square miles (2.58 km^{2}), of which 0.99 square miles (2.56 km^{2}) (or 99.4%) is land and 0.006 square miles (0.02 km^{2}) (or 0.6%) is water.

Creal Springs is located in southeastern Williamson County, on the north slope of the Shawnee Hills.

== Demographics ==
Historical population
Census	Pop.	Note	%±
1890	539		—
1900	940		74.4%
1910	936		−0.4%
1920	1,002		7.1%
1930	766		−23.6%
1940	950		24.0%
1950	864		−9.1%
1960	784		−9.3%
1970	830		5.9%
1980	845		1.8%
1990	791		−6.4%
2000	702		−11.3%
2010	543		−22.6%
2020	505		−7.0%
U.S. Census

As of the census of 2000, there were 702 people, 292 households, and 186 families residing in the city. The population density was 709.1 inhabitants per square mile (273.8/km^{2}). There were 318 housing units at an average density of 321.2 per square mile (124.0/km^{2}). The racial makeup of the city was 97.29% White, 0.14% African American, 0.57% Native American, 0.28% Asian, 0.28% from other races, and 1.42% from two or more races. Hispanic or Latino of any race were 1.71% of the population.

There were 292 households, out of which 25.7% had children under the age of 18 living with them, 45.9% were married couples living together, 13.0% had a female householder with no husband present, and 36.3% were non-families. 32.9% of all households were made up of individuals, and 14.4% had someone living alone who was 65 years of age or older. The average household size was 2.28 and the average family size was 2.94.

In the city the population was spread out, with 23.4% under the age of 18, 9.0% from 18 to 24, 25.2% from 25 to 44, 23.8% from 45 to 64, and 18.7% who were 65 years of age or older. The median age was 39 years. For every 100 females, there were 97.7 males. For every 100 females age 18 and over, there were 95.6 males.

The median income for a household in the city was $25,272, and the median income for a family was $29,583. Males had a median income of $26,250 versus $17,125 for females. The per capita income for the city was $13,483. About 18.8% of families and 23.7% of the population were below the poverty line, including 37.6% of those under age 18 and 12.0% of those age 65 or over.

== Education ==
It is in the Marion Community Unit School District 2.

Marion CUSD operates the Adams School or Creal Springs Elementary School. Secondary schools are Marion Junior High and Marion High School.
