= Energy, Illinois =

Energy
- Village
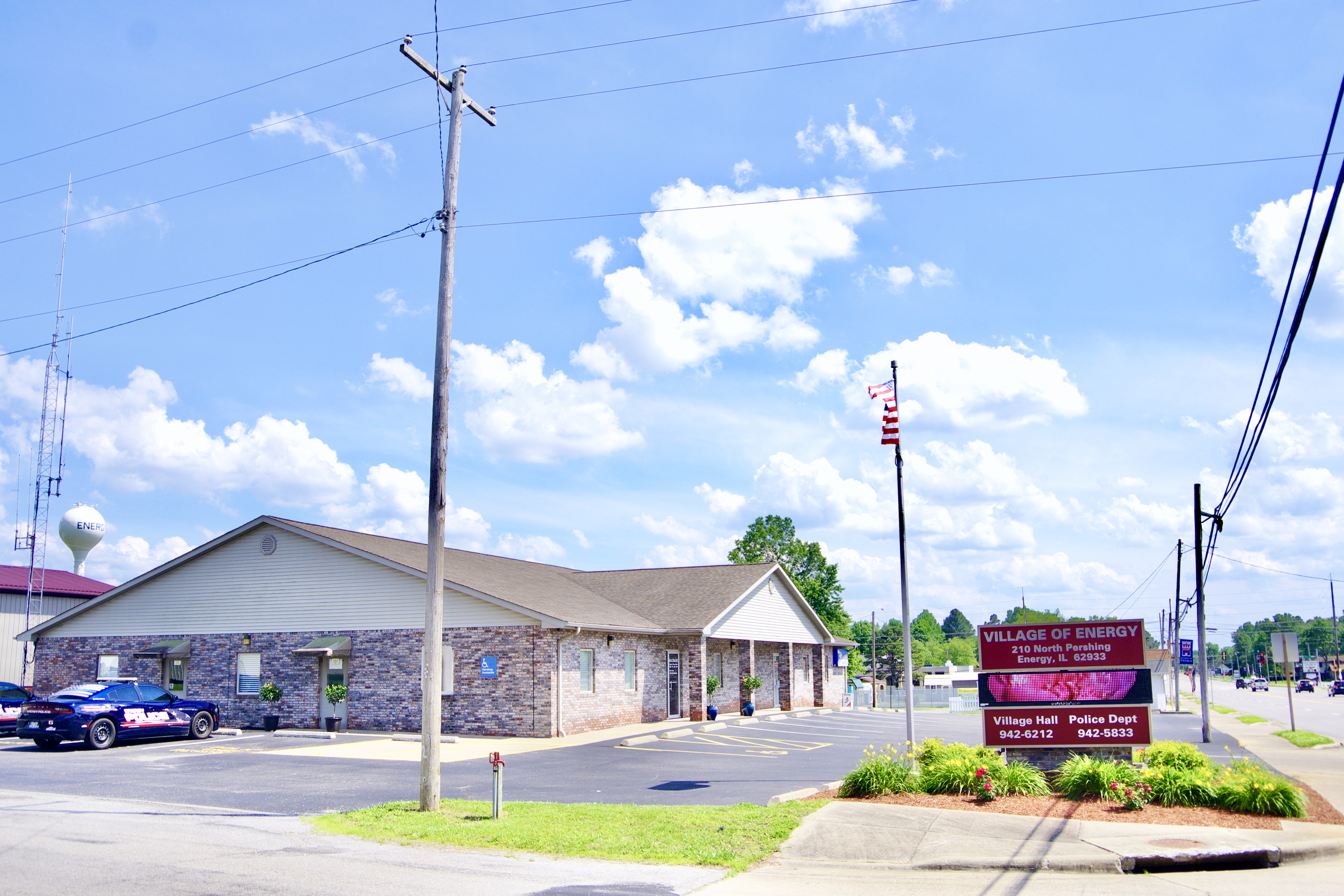
- Village hall along Pershing Street (IL 148)
- Motto: The heart of southern Illinois
- Location of Energy in Williamson County, Illinois.

- Location of Illinois in the United States
- Coordinates: 37°46′21″N 89°1′32″W
- Country: United States
- State: Illinois
- County: Williamson

Area
  - Total: 1.21 sq mi (3.14 km^{2})
  - Land: 1.19 sq mi (3.09 km^{2})
  - Water: 0.019 sq mi (0.05 km^{2})
- Elevation: 459 ft (140 m)

Population (2020)
  - Total: 974
  - Density: 815.9/sq mi (315.01/km^{2})
- Time zone: UTC-6 (CST)
  - Summer (DST): UTC-5 (CDT)
- ZIP Code: 62933
- Area code: 618
- FIPS code: 17-24166
- GNIS feature ID: 2398834
- FIPS code: 17-24166
- GNIS ID: 2398834
- Wikimedia Commons: Energy, Illinois
- Website: www.villageofenergy.com

Energy is a village in Williamson County, Illinois, United States. The population was 974 at the 2020 census. The community was named for local "Energy" brand coal.

== History ==
What is now Energy was originally known as "Fordville," which was established in the early 1900s as a stop along the Coal Belt Railway. It was named for Wiley Ford and his son, William, who platted the village. A post office opened in 1905, and the village incorporated the following year.

In 1909, Herbert Taylor (1876–1937) purchased the coal mining operations in the area. He marketed his company's coal under the name "Energy," and in 1913 he convinced the Fordville village council to adopt this name for the village. The post office changed its name the same year.

== Geography ==
Energy is located at 37°46′21″N 89°1′32″W (37.772398, -89.025519).

According to the 2010 census, Energy has a total area of 1.198 square miles (3.10 km^{2}), of which 1.18 square miles (3.06 km^{2}) (or 98.5%) is land and 0.018 square miles (0.05 km^{2}) (or 1.5%) is water.

== Demographics ==
Historical population
Census	Pop.	Note	%±
1910	885		—
1920	792		−10.5%
1930	554		−30.1%
1940	458		−17.3%
1950	503		9.8%
1960	507		0.8%
1970	812		60.2%
1980	1,138		40.1%
1990	1,106		−2.8%
2000	1,175		6.2%
2010	1,146		−2.5%
2020	974		−15.0%
U.S. Census; for 2020

As of the 2000 United States census, there were 1,175 people, 481 households, and 304 families residing in the village. The population density was 990.9 inhabitants per square mile (382.6/km^{2}). There were 519 housing units at an average density of 437.7 per square mile (169.0/km^{2}). The racial makeup of the village was 97.62% White, 0.94% African American, 0.09% Native American, 0.43% Asian, and 0.94% from two or more races. Hispanic or Latino of any race were 0.60% of the population.

There were 481 households, out of which 24.1% had children under the age of 18 living with them, 50.9% were married couples living together, 10.0% had a female householder with no husband present, and 36.6% were non-families. 30.4% of all households were made up of individuals, and 12.5% had someone living alone who was 65 years of age or older. The average household size was 2.19 and the average family size was 2.71.

In the village, the population was spread out, with 17.5% under the age of 18, 9.4% from 18 to 24, 24.5% from 25 to 44, 28.3% from 45 to 64, and 20.3% who were 65 years of age or older. The median age was 44 years. For every 100 females, there were 84.7 males. For every 100 females age 18 and over, there were 80.8 males.

The median income for a household in the village was $28,750, and the median income for a family was $39,554. Males had a median income of $27,446 versus $21,250 for females. The per capita income for the village was $14,656. About 7.5% of families and 12.1% of the population were below the poverty line, including 12.5% of those under age 18 and 4.9% of those age 65 or over.
