= List of geographic portmanteaus =

This is a list of geographic portmanteaus. Portmanteaus (also called blends) are names constructed by combining elements of two, or occasionally more, other names.

For the most part, the geographic names in this list were derived from two other names or words. Those derived from three or more names are usually considered acronyms or initialisms and can be found in the List of geographic acronyms and initialisms. However, there are exceptions to this two/three rule in both lists, so it is more of a guideline than a hard-and-fast rule.

Note that not all combinations of two names are considered portmanteaus. Simple concatenation of two names (whether hyphenated or not) does not produce a portmanteau. Nor does a combinative form of one name plus the full name of another (examples: Eurasia, Czechoslovakia). These kinds of names are excluded from this list.

== Regions named from their components ==
Some regions (including countries and provinces) have names that are portmanteaus of subregions or cities within the region.

=== Countries ===
- Senegambia Confederation — Senegal and The Gambia
- Tanzania — Tanganyika and Zanzibar

=== Chinese provinces ===
Some Chinese provinces have names that are blends of their two largest cities.

- Anhui — Anqing and Huizhou (now Huangshan City)
- Fujian — Fuzhou and Jianzhou (now Nanping)
- Gansu — Ganzhou and Suzhou
- Jiangsu — Jiangning (now Nanjing) and Suzhou

=== Korean provinces ===
During the Joseon Kingdom, seven Korean provinces (all but the region around the capital) were named by combining the first characters of their two major cities. The provinces were reorganized in the 1890s but the names are still in use. All these traditional provincial names are carried forward by two current provinces and for all except Gangwon (which is the only one where the two carrying the name were split between North and South Korea) a North and a South province of the same name. However note that for most former provinces, the two current provinces with the name are usually not entirely coextensive with the former province.

The dates of the former provinces are those when they carried that name; they often existed with a different name before that year.

- Chungcheong Province — Chungju and Cheongju, former province (1356 to 1895); the name is currently carried by North Chungcheong and South Chungcheong provinces in South Korea
- Gangwon Province (historical) — Gangneung and Wonju, former province (1395 to 1895); name now carried by Gangwon Province, South Korea and Kangwon Province (North Korea)
- Gyeongsang Province — Gyeongju and Sangju, former province (1314–1895); name is currently carried by South Gyeongsang Province and North Gyeongsang Province in South Korea
- Hamgyong Province — Hamhung and Kyongsong, former province (1509–1895); name currently carried by North Hamgyong Province and South Hamgyong Province in North Korea
- Hwanghae Province — Hwangju and Haeju, former province (1395–1895); name carried by North Hwanghae Province and South Hwanghae Province in North Korea
- Jeolla Province — Jeonju and Naju (The first character of Naju is actually "ra"—"r" changes to "n" in the initial position, and the combination "nr" changes to "ll" due to phonological characteristics of the Korean language); now in South Korea
- Pyongan Province — Pyongyang and Anju, former province (1413–1895), now in North Korea

=== Somalia provinces ===
Two of Somalia's federal member states are portmanteaus of the smaller administrative regions (gobols) within the states.

- Galmudug — Galguduud and Mudug
- Hirshabelle — Hiran and Middle Shabelle

=== Vanuatu provinces ===
Half of Vanuatu's provincial names are portmanteaus of their main islands or island groups.

- Sanma Province — Espiritu Santo and Malo Island
- Shefa Province — Shepherd Islands and Efate
- Torba Province — Torres Islands and Banks Islands

=== Merged towns ===
Sometimes a portmanteau name is created from the names of predecessor towns. Names that are merely a concatenation of the predecessor names, such as Budapest, are excluded.

- Beaverdell, British Columbia — Beaverton and Rendell
- Brockton, Ontario — Brant, Greenock, and Walkerton
- Clarington, Ontario — Clarke and Darlington, two townships
- Rural Municipality of Corman Park No. 344, Saskatchewan — three rural municipalities: Cory No. 344, Warman No. 374 and Park No. 375
- Fairborn, Ohio — Fairfield and Osborn
- Glanbrook, Hamilton, Ontario — Glanford and Binbrook
- Grenola, Kansas — Green Field and Canola
- Kenora, Ontario — Keewatin, Norman, and Rat Portage
- Őrbottyán, Pest county, Hungary — Őrszentmiklós and Vácbottyán.
- Ramara, Ontario — Rama and Mara Townships
- Sandton, Johannesburg, South Africa — Sandown and Bryanston
- Stonewood, West Virginia — Stonewall and Norwood
- Temvik, North Dakota — Templeton and Larvik

=== Schools and school districts ===
Some school districts that serve two or three towns have names that are either blends of those towns' names or blends of county names that the district covers parts of.

- Carlmont High School (San Carlos, California and Belmont, California)
- Chariho Regional School District (Charlestown, Richmond, and Hopkinton), three towns in southwestern Rhode Island who share the district.
- Glenbard Township High School District 87 (Glen Ellyn, Illinois and Lombard, Illinois), two villages who combined to create the district
- Kenowa Hills Public Schools (Kent and Ottawa counties), created in 1963 near Grand Rapids, Michigan
- Lin-Wood Public School (Lincoln, New Hampshire and Woodstock, New Hampshire), in Grafton County
- Midpark High School (Middleburg Heights, Ohio and Brook Park, Ohio) former high school whose name survives in Berea–Midpark High School, in Berea, Ohio
- Montabella Community Schools (Montcalm and Isabella counties), created in 1966 in Michigan
- Nordonia Hills City School District (Northfield (Village and Center), Macedonia and Sagamore Hills) in Summit County, Ohio
- Schalmont Central School District (Schenectady, Albany, and Montgomery Counties in New York), covers parts of all three counties
- Woodmore Local School District (Woodville, Ohio and Elmore, Ohio) in Sandusky and Ottawa Counties

=== Other regions portmanteaued from their components ===
- Afrabia — Africa and Arabia
- Benelux — Belgium, Netherlands, Luxembourg
- Chambana, Illinois — Champaign and Urbana, Illinois
- Chindia — China and India
- Eurabia — Europe and Arabia
- Gerbangkertosusila — Gresik, Bangkalan, Mojokerto, Surabaya, Sidoarjo, Lamongan
- Rural Municipality of Kellross No. 247, Saskatchewan — Kelliher and Leross, two villages within the municipality
- Lamorinda — a region of Contra Costa County, California comprising Lafayette, Moraga, and Orinda
- Rural Municipality of Mayfield No. 406, Saskatchewan — Maymont and Fielding, two communities within the municipality
- Sauk Prairie, Wisconsin — Sauk City and Prairie du Sac
- Talsinki — Tallinn, Estonia and Helsinki, Finland, informal region around these two capitals, especially in regards to the proposed tunnel between them
- Valguedas — Valtierra and Arguedas, informal name for the area of two Navarrese villages

== Border portmanteaus ==
A border portmanteau combines the names of two, or occasionally three, adjacent polities (countries, states, provinces, counties, cities) to form a name for a region, town, body of water, or other feature on or near their mutual border.

=== Regions ===
==== Generalized border regions ====
These are generalized (and unofficial) regions usually centered on cities near state borders in the United States. They usually extend across state lines and their names are portmanteaus of two or three state names.

- Arklahoma (Arkansas and Oklahoma) region centered around Fort Smith, Arkansas
- Arklamiss (Arkansas, Louisiana, and Mississippi) region near Monroe, Louisiana
- Ark-La-Tex (Arkansas, Louisiana, and Texas) a U.S. socio-economic region where Arkansas, Louisiana, Texas, and Oklahoma intersect; urban center is Shreveport, Louisiana
- Cal-Neva (California and Nevada) centered in the Sierra Nevada mountains west of Reno, Nevada
- Florgia (Florida and Georgia) centered on Jacksonville, Florida
- Georgialina (Georgia and South Carolina) a term for the Central Savannah River Area (CSRA) of Augusta, Georgia and its surrounding areas
- Illiana (Illinois and Indiana) centered on Danville, Illinois
- Illowa (Illinois and Iowa) region centered around the Quad Cities area
- Kentuckiana (Kentucky and Indiana) a popular local name for the Louisville-Jefferson County, KY-IN Metropolitan Statistical Area, centered on Louisville, Kentucky and spreading across the Ohio River into Indiana
- Michiana (Michigan and Indiana) region whose main urban center is South Bend, Indiana
- Minnesconsin (Minnesota and Wisconsin) area of northwestern Wisconsin near the Minneapolis–Saint Paul metropolitan area (unlike the others, this region does not extend across the state line)
- Texhoma (Texas and Oklahoma) centered on Wichita Falls, Texas and not necessarily distinct from Texoma
- Texoma (Texas and Oklahoma) region surrounding Lake Texoma

==== Other portmanteau regions ====
- Delmarva Peninsula (Delaware, Maryland, and Virginia) a large peninsula on the East Coast of the United States, occupied by Delaware and portions of Maryland and Virginia
- Kennessee (Kentucky and Tennessee) a formerly disputed strip of land along the Kentucky-Tennessee border

=== Towns, villages, and localities ===
§ This symbol marks localities with no current population; some of them never had any population.

==== Blends of country, state, and province names ====
Note: places listed on the same line are immediately across the border from each other. Some others with non-similar names are also across a border from each other.

- § Alaflora, Alabama (Alabama and Florida) former logging town in Escambia County
- § Alaga, Alabama (Alabama and Georgia) town and shipping point where the Alabama Midland Railway crossed the Chattahoochee River
- Alcan Border, Alaska (Alaska and Canada) port of entry where the Alaska Highway (formerly the Alcan Highway) crosses into Alaska
- Alsask, Saskatchewan (Alberta and Saskatchewan)
- Arkana, Louisiana and Arkana, Arkansas (Arkansas and Louisiana) town of some 500 people with post office (1890–1931) in Lafayette County, Arkansas and Bossier Parish, Louisiana; now reduced to a single tavern on the Louisiana side of the border,
- Arkinda, Arkansas (Arkansas and Indian Territory, now Oklahoma) former trading post with the Choctaw Nation just across the Indian Territory line
- § Arkla, Arkansas (Arkansas and Louisiana), former railroad stop in Chicot County
- § Arkmo, Missouri (Arkansas and Missouri) likely former stop on the Kennett & Osceola Railroad in Dunklin County
- Arkoma, Oklahoma (Arkansas and Oklahoma)
- Armorel, Arkansas (Arkansas, Missouri, and initials of Robert E. Lee Wilson)
- § Artex, Arkansas (Arkansas and Texas) locality and former post office about 10 miles (16 kilometers) east of Texarkana
- Calexico, California (California and Mexico)
- Calexico Lodge, California (California and Mexico) place in San Diego County near Boulevard, California
- § Calneva, California (California and Nevada) former town near Calneva Lake, east of Honey Lake
- Cal-Nev-Ari, Nevada (California, Nevada, and Arizona)
- § Calor, California (California and Oregon) former railroad stop in Siskiyou County, some 8 miles (13 kilometers) east of Dorris, California
- § Calor, Oregon (California and Oregon) former railroad stop on Southern Pacific's Cascade Line
- § Calvada, California (California and Nevada) former stop on the Central Pacific Railroad
- Calvada Springs, California (California and Nevada), now known as Charleston View
- § Calzona, California (California and Arizona) former town with a post office (1909–14) and rail depot (1909–17) on the Arizona and California Railway; site now west of Big River, California
- § Carotenn, North Carolina (North Carolina and Tennessee) another name for Lost Cove, North Carolina, a former logging town and moonshining locale, now a ghost town
- Carova Beach, North Carolina (North Carolina and Virginia)
- § Cokan, Kansas (Colorado and Kansas), community located about 2 miles (3 kilometers) east of the Colorado-Kansas line in Greeley County from the 1930s to the 1950s
- § Colmex, Colorado (Colorado and New Mexico) former Denver and Rio Grande Railroad stop in La Plata County
- § Colokan, Kansas (Colorado and Kansas) a short-lived (1887–1897) town half a mile east of the Colorado-Kansas border in Greeley County
- § Dakomin, Minnesota (South Dakota and Minnesota) former town on Lake Traverse
- Delmar, Delaware and Delmar, Maryland (Delaware and Maryland)
- Flomaton, Alabama (Florida, Alabama, plus -ton)
- Florala, Alabama (Florida and Alabama)
- § Idavada, Idaho (Idaho and Nevada) historical locale in Twin Falls County, Idaho across the state line from Jackpot, Nevada
- § Idmon, Idaho (Idaho and Montana) former town in the Camas Meadows area of Clark County
- § Illiana, Illinois (Edgar County) (Illinois and Indiana) former name of Raven, Illinois
- Illiana, Illinois (Vermilion County) (Illinois and Indiana)
- Illiana Heights, Illinois (Illinois and Indiana)
- Illmo, Scott City, Missouri (Illinois and Missouri) railroad town located at the Missouri end of a rail bridge over the Mississippi River; now merged with Scott City
- § Kanado, Kansas (Kansas and Colorado), community located about 10 miles (16 kilometers) east of Colorado-Kansas line in Greeley County during the 1940s
- Kanorado, Kansas (Kansas and Colorado) town in the middle of sunflower fields that has seen busier days
- Kenova, West Virginia (Kentucky, Ohio, and West Virginia)
- Kensee, Kentucky (Kentucky and Tennessee), former coal mining town in Whitley County near Jellico, Tennessee
- Kentenia, Kentucky (Kentucky, Tennessee, and Virginia) former coal mining town in Harlan County near the southeastern point of Kentucky
- Kenvir, Kentucky (Kentucky and Virginia) former coal mining town whose mineworkers engaged in the Coal Wars in Harlan County, including the Battle of Evarts
- § Laark, Louisiana (Louisiana and Arkansas), former shipping and supply point in northeastern Morehouse Parish; now a rural locality
- § Latex, Louisiana and Latex, Texas (Louisiana and Texas) former town on the border, in both Caddo Parish, Louisiana and Harrison County, Texas
- Latex, Texas (Panola County) (Louisiana and Texas) former name of Panola, Texas
- Mardela Springs, Maryland (Maryland and Delaware)
- Marydel, Delaware and Marydel, Maryland (Maryland and Delaware)
- § Mexhoma, Oklahoma (New Mexico and Oklahoma)town along the Cimarron Route of the Santa Fe Trail; now no longer inhabited
- Mexicali, Baja California (Mexico and California)
- Michiana, Michigan and Michiana Shores, Indiana (Michigan and Indiana)
- § Missala, Alabama (Mississippi and Alabama) former post office (1916–1925) serving a short-lived logging boom in Choctaw County
- Moark, Arkansas (Missouri and Arkansas) town formed when the railroad came in the 1870s and went away when the rail did in the 1960s
- § Moark, Missouri (Missouri and Arkansas) former shipping point for the Missouri-Arkansas Lumber Company
- § Mokan, Missouri (Missouri and Kansas) former coal-shipping town in Bates County
- § Mondak, Montana and East Mondak, North Dakota (Montana and North Dakota) Wild West town providing liquor, gambling, and other adult recreations during a period when North Dakota prohibited alcohol and Montana did not; losing its raison d'etre with Prohibition, the town was abandoned and then destroyed by wildfire in the 1920s,
- Monida, Montana (Montana and Idaho) former rail service town where the Utah and Northern Railroad crossed the Continental Divide at Monida Pass
- § Monota, Montana (Montana and North Dakota) village with post office in the early 20th century
- Nocarva, North Carolina (North Carolina and Virginia) community of lakeside homes with private airstrip on the shore of Lake Gaston
- North Kenova, Ohio (Kentucky, Ohio, (West) Virginia)
- § Nosodak, North Dakota (North and South Dakota) platted, but never actually settled; town site now within Lake Oahe
- § Nypenn, New York (New York and Pennsylvania) former station on the New York, Chicago, and St. Louis Railroad south of State Line in Chautauqua County
- § Oklarado, Colorado (Oklahoma and Colorado) former farming community in Baca County
- § Orcal, Oregon (Oregon and California) former railroad stop on the Southern Pacific's Siskiyou Line
- § Otex, Oklahoma (Harmon County) (Oklahoma and Texas)
- § Otex, Oklahoma (Texas County) (Oklahoma and Texas) former post office just northeast of Texhoma
- Pen Mar, Maryland and Pen Mar, Pennsylvania (Pennsylvania and Maryland)
- Penowa, Pennsylvania (Pennsylvania, Ohio, and West Virginia) small residential community, formerly a coal mining town, in Washington County
- Saskalta, Alberta (Saskatchewan and Alberta), former name of Altario
- Sylmar, Maryland and Sylmar, Pennsylvania (Pennsylvania and Maryland) former town with rail station straddling the state border near US Highway 1, now a rural area
- § Tenark, Arkansas (Tennessee and Arkansas) Union Pacific Railroad stop southwest of West Memphis, Arkansas
- § Tennelina, North Carolina (Tennessee and North Carolina) former post office on Shut-in Creek in Madison County
- § Tennemo, Tennessee (Tennessee and Missouri) former lumber town (saw mill and shipping point) on the Mississippi River in Dyer County
- Tennga, Georgia (Tennessee and Georgia)
- Texarkana, Texas and Texarkana, Arkansas (Texas, Arkansas, and Louisiana)
- Texhoma, Oklahoma and Texhoma, Texas (Texas and Oklahoma)
- Texico, New Mexico (Texas and New Mexico)
- Texla, Texas (Texas and Louisiana) former logging town with post office (1905–1929) in Orange County
- Texola, Oklahoma (Texas and Oklahoma), previously known as Texoma and Texokla
- § Ucolo, Utah (Utah and Colorado)
- § Urado, Utah (Utah and Colorado) former post office and school in San Juan County
- § Utida, Utah (Utah and Idaho) former railroad town (including maintenance shop) on the Utah Northern Railroad (now Union Pacific Railroad) in Cache County
- Uvada, Nevada (Utah and Nevada) ranching community in White Pine County
- § Uvada, Utah (Utah and Nevada) former rail station and siding in Iron County
- Vershire, Vermont (Vermont and New Hampshire)
- Virgilina, Virginia (Virginia and North Carolina)
- Vir-Mar Beach, Virginia (Virginia and Maryland) riverside community near the confluence of the Patomac with Chesapeake Bay
- Wyocolo, Wyoming (Wyoming and Colorado)
- § Wyuta, Utah (Wyoming and Utah) former station on the Union Pacific Railroad in either Rich or Summit Counties

==== Blends of county names ====
- Banida, Idaho (Bannock and Oneida Counties)
- Calion, Arkansas (Calhoun and Union Counties)
- Colmor, New Mexico (Colfax and Mora Counties)
- Dalark, Arkansas (Dallas and Clark Counties)
- Dalhart, Texas (Dallam and Hartley Counties)
- Dalrock, Texas (Dallas and Rockwall Counties) neighbourhood of Rowlett, Texas near and along Dalrock Road
- Flomot, Texas (Floyd and Motley Counties)
- Kiogree, Oklahoma (Kiowa and Greer Counties)
- Harbell, Kentucky (Harlan and Bell Counties)
- Inyokern, California (Kern and Inyo Counties)
- Linchester, Maryland (Caroline and Dorchester Counties)
- Manasota, Florida and Manasota Key, Florida (Manatee and Sarasota Counties)
- Norcatur, Kansas (Norton and Decatur Counties)
- Wamac, Illinois (Washington, Marion, and Clinton Counties)
- Yampo, Oregon (Yamhill and Polk Counties)
- Yolano, California (Yolo and Solano Counties)

==== Blends of town names ====
- Arlmont Village (Arlington and Belmont), neighbourhood of Arlington, Massachusetts
- Bel-Red (Bellevue, Washington and Redmond, Washington) a neighbourhood of Bellevue adjacent to Redmond
- Burnaugh, Kentucky (Burgess Station and Kavanaugh)
- Dalworthington Gardens, Texas (Dallas, Fort Worth, and Arlington)
- Deltona, Florida, (DeLand and Daytona)
- Ellport, Pennsylvania (Ellwood City and Portersville)
- Gerled, Iowa (German and Ledyard Townships)
- Glendale Heights, Illinois (Glen Ellyn and Bloomingdale)
- Hadlyme, Connecticut (Haddam and Lyme, adjacent towns)
- Harwinton, Connecticut (Hartford, Windsor, and Farmington)
- Kreuzkölln, Berlin (Kreuzberg and Neukölln) unofficial name of a gentrified area composed of northern Neukölln and southern Kreuzberg, two boroughs of Berlin, Germany
- Linworth, Ohio (Dublin and Worthington)
- Marven Gardens, Margate City, New Jersey (Margate City and Ventnor City), neighbourhood that the Monopoly location Marvin Gardens was named after.
- Mayro Park, Gauteng, South Africa (Mayberry Park and Alrode, two suburbs of Alberton, Gauteng)
- Milmay, New Jersey (Millville and Mays Landing)
- Mindale, Illinois (Minier, Illinois and Hopedale, Illinois), community in Tazewell County
- Norridge, Illinois (Norwood Park Township and Park Ridge)
- Norview (Norfolk, Virginia and Ocean View (Norfolk)), neighbourhood of Norfolk, Virginia
- Sanlando Springs, Florida (Sanford, Florida and Orlando, Florida)
- SeaTac, Washington (Seattle and Tacoma)
- Vade, Saskatchewan (Vanscoy and Delisle), rail siding at potash mine between the two towns
- Vanport City, Oregon (Portland, Oregon and Vancouver, Washington), a town on the Portland side of the Columbia river, no longer in existence.
- Ventucopa, California (Ventura and Maricopa)
- Warranwood, Victoria (Warrandyte South and Ringwood) suburbs of Melbourne
- Willowick, Ohio (Willoughby and Wickliffe) suburbs of Cleveland

=== Bodies of water ===
Lakes that are on or near borders also sometimes get named with portmanteaus of the neighbouring polities.

- Alsask Lake(Alberta and Saskatchewan) near Alsask, Saskatchewan
- Arkla Lake (Arkansas and Louisiana) Miller County, Arkansas
- Calneva Lake (California and Nevada) Lassen County, California
- Lake Keomah — a man-made lake 4 miles (6 kilometers) east of Oskaloosa, Iowa named for the two counties that financed it, Keokuk and Mahaska
- Lake Koocanusa — a reservoir named for the river it dams (Kootenay River) and the countries whose border it straddles (Canada and United States) located in British Columbia and Montana
- Mansask Lake (Manitoba and Saskatchewan) near Saskman Lake
- Mantario Lake (Manitoba and Ontario)
- Mantricia Lake (Manitoba and Patricia District, part of Kenora District, Ontario)
- Lake Michiana (Michigan and Indiana) Branch County, Michigan and Steuben County, Indiana
- Sangchris Lake (Sangamon and Christian Counties) reservoir southeast of Springfield, Illinois
- Saskman Lake (Saskatchewan and Manitoba) near Mansask Lake
- Saskoba Lake (Saskatchewan and Manitoba)
- Lake Talquin — Tallahassee and Quincy, Florida
- Texarkana Reservoir (Texas, Arkansas, and Louisiana) original name of reservoir on the Sulphur River in Texas, renamed Lake Texarkana, now known as Wright Patman Lake
- Lake Texoma — a man-made lake on the Red River that divides Texas and Oklahoma
- Uvada Reservoir (Utah and Nevada) Lincoln County, Nevada
- Lake Wissota (Wisconsin and Minnesota) a large reservoir in Chippewa Falls, Wisconsin

=== Topography ===
Geographic features on borders or between towns sometimes get border portmanteau names.

- Canalaska Mountain, (Canada and Alaska)
- Canida Peak (Canada and Idaho)
- Chiwaukee Prairie (Chicago and Milwaukee) large prairie in southeast Wisconsin preserved as a wildlife area
- Huatung Valley — from Hualien City to Taitung City in eastern Taiwan
- Monida Pass (Montana and Idaho)

=== Roads and other forms of transportation ===
These can either run along or near a border or connect two places.

==== Roads along a border ====
- Beltagh Avenue (North Bellmore, New York and Wantagh, New York) part runs along the boundary between the hamlets of North Bellmore and Wantagh, the rest along the boundary between Bellmore and North Bellmore
- Can-Ada Road (Canyon County, Idaho and Ada County, Idaho) along two different sections of the county line, one known as North Can-Ada Road and the other as South Can-Ada Road.
- Canusa Street (Canada and United States) runs along the border between Beebe Plain, Vermont and Standstead, Quebec
- Clarabella Road (Clare County, Michigan and Isabella County, Michigan), on the county line near the city of Clare
- Clareola Avenue (Clare County, Michigan and Osceola County, Michigan) road on county line
- Claroskee Road (Clare County, Michigan, Roscommon County, Michigan, and Missaukee County, Michigan), road along northern border of Clare County and southern border of Missaukee and Roscommon Counties
- Clarwin Road, Clarwin Avenue (Clare County Michigan and Gladwin County, Michigan) road along county line, with different parts known as Road and Avenue
- Clintonia Road (Clinton County, Michigan and Ionia County, Michigan) western border of Clinton County, eastern border of Ionia County
- Costabella Avenue (Mecosta County, Michigan and Isabella County, Michigan), on the county line
- Dalrock Road (Dallas County, Texas and Rockwall County, Texas) on the county line within the city of Rowlett, Texas
- Fitchrona Road (Fitchburg, Wisconsin and Verona (town), Wisconsin) road on the town line between two Dane County communities
- Grand-Kal Road (Grand Traverse County, Michigan and Kalkaska County, Michigan), on the county line near the village of Fife Lake
- Kenowa Avenue (Kent County, Michigan and Ottawa County, Michigan) western border of Kent, eastern border of Ottawa
- Meceola Road (Mecosta County, Michigan and Osceola County, Michigan), road along the border of two counties.
- Michiana Drive (Michigan and Indiana) street on the mutual city limits of Michiana, Michigan and Michiana Shores, Indiana, which also puts it on the state border between Michigan and Indiana
- Millfair Road (Millcreek Township and Fairview Township) road along the border of two townships in Erie County, Pennsylvania
- Newcosta Avenue (Newaygo County, Michigan and Mecosta County, Michigan), road along the county line
- Oranole Road (Orange County, Florida and Seminole County, Florida), road runs along county border
- Ottagan Street (Ottawa County, Michigan and Allegan County, Michigan) southern border of Ottawa, northern border of Allegan
- Stainash Crescent (Staines-upon-Thames and Ashford, Surrey), east of Staines, west of Ashford

==== Connectors ====
- Alcan Highway (Alaska and Canada) also known as the Alaska Highway
- Bakerloo line (Baker Street and Waterloo) London Underground line originally just connecting the Waterloo tube station with the Baker Street tube station, although now it goes much further
- Bel-red Road (Bellevue, Washington and Redmond, Washington) the main street of Bel-Red, Bellevue connecting two Seattle suburbs
- Duraleigh Road (Durham, North Carolina and Raleigh, North Carolina) road connecting these two cities.
- Floribraska Avenue, Tampa, Florida (Florida Avenue and Nebraska Avenue) connects North Florida Avenue on the west with Nebraska Avenue on the east, passing under Interstate-275 and crossing several other streets
- Hurontario Street (Lake Huron and Lake Ontario) from Mississagua, Ontario on Lake Ontario to Collingwood, Ontario on Lake Huron
- Ken Tenn Highway (Kentucky and Tennessee) Tennessee State Route 214, a road between Fulton, Kentucky/South Fulton, Tennessee and Union City, Tennessee
- Melqua Road (Melrose, Oregon and Umpqua, Oregon) road between two small Oregon communities
- Semoran Boulevard (Florida State Road 436) runs in Seminole County, Florida and Orange County, Florida
- Tamiami Trail (Tampa and Miami) highway connecting two Florida cities
- Tenn-Tom (Tennessee River and Tombigbee River) popular name for the Tennessee–Tombigbee Waterway

=== Other border portmanteaus ===
- Frelard (Fremont, Seattle and Ballard, Seattle) an unofficial neighbourhood where two other neighbourhoods meet
- Mantario Trail (Manitoba and Ontario) hiking trail mostly in Manitoba but partially in Ontario
- Mari-Osa State Wildlife Area, Missouri (Maries and Osage Counties)
- Minn-Kota State Wildlife Management Area, Minnesota (Minnesota and South Dakota)

=== Maps ===
Below are maps of the towns (red dots), bodies of water (blue dots), and other geographic features (green dots) that are portmanteaus of country, state, and province names. Also included are pseudo-border portmanteau towns (yellow dots).

Border portmanteaus in Manitoba
Border portmanteaus in and near Alberta
C
Border portmanteaus in and near Saskatchewan
Border portmanteaus in the United States
Border portmanteaus in Alaska

Map legend:

red dot = border portmanteau towns and localities
yellow dot = pseudo-border portmanteaus
blue dot = bodies of water
green dot = other features

== Pseudo-border portmanteaus ==
Some places have names that are blends of country, state, and provincial names. However, they are either not near their mutual border, or of regions that do not have a mutual border.

- Altario, Alberta (Alberta and Ontario), formerly Saskalta (Saskatchewan and Alberta)
- Altorado, Alberta (Alberta and Colorado), named by Mormon settlers from Colorado
- Arizmo, Arizona (Arizona and Missouri), settled by people from Missouri
- Arkana, Arkansas (Baxter County) (Arkansas and Louisiana)
- Cal-Ida, California (California and Idaho)
- Counciltucky (Council Bluffs and Kentucky), a derogatory nickname for Council Bluffs, Iowa, used by residents of neighboring Omaha, Nebraska.
- Delmar Boulevard (Delaware and Maryland), major street in St. Louis, Missouri; named by two early landowners along the street, one from Delaware and one from Maryland
- Delmar Township, Pennsylvania (Delaware and Maryland), originally Virdelmar (Virginia, Delaware and Maryland)
- Flomich, Florida (Florida and Michigan), founder being a native of Michigan
- Floribec, Florida (Florida and Quebec), area of Florida very popular with Québécois vacationers and increasingly all-year residents
- § Kaneb, Nebraska (Kansas and Nebraska), BNSF Railway stop in Fillmore County
- Kyana, Indiana (Kentucky and Indiana)
- § Kymo, Arizona (Kentucky and Missouri), first settlers were two families, one from each state
- Lake Wissota, Wisconsin (Wisconsin and Minnesota), town on the lake, also known as Lake Wissota Village
- Mankota, Saskatchewan (Manitoba and North Dakota), original homes of the settlers
- Mantario, Saskatchewan (Manitoba and Ontario), named after two provinces in imitation of nearby Alsask
- Michillinda Lodge, Michigan (Michigan, Illinois, and Indiana)
- Ohiowa, Nebraska (Ohio and Iowa), settled by people from both states.
- Ovapa, West Virginia (Ohio, Virginia, Pennsylvania)
- Sasman No. 336, Saskatchewan (Saskatchewan and Manitoba), Regional Municipality, the equivalent of a county
- Tennala, Alabama (Tennessee and Alabama)
- Texhoma City, Texas (Texas and Oklahoma) oil boom town in Archer County during the 1920s; gradually disappeared after the oil was gone
- Texla, Texas (Houston County) (Texas and Louisiana) not near Houston, but also not near the Louisiana border
- Texmo, Oklahoma (Texas and Missouri) settlers from Missouri
- Ukalta, Alberta (Ukraine and Alberta)
- § Viropa, West Virginia (Virginia, Ohio, Pennsylvania)
- Wyodak, Wyoming (Wyoming and South Dakota)

== From personal names ==
Most here are blends of two personal names, but some are of a personal name with some other name or word.

- Adsul, Texas — Adams and Sullivan, sawmill owners
- Albertha, North Dakota — Allen Town and Bertha Dickie
- Alikanna, Ohio — Alexander and Anna Beatty, town founders
- Allock, Kentucky — J. B. Allen and H. E. Bullock, mine owners
- Almena, Wisconsin — Albert and Wilhelmena Koehler, early settlers
- Alpat Lake (body of water in Saskatchewan) — Al Billwiller and Pat Gillis, prospectors
- Andale, Kansas — Anderson and Dale, early settlers
- Anjean, West Virginia — Ann and Jean, mother and daughter, respectively, of mine owner, Mr Leckie
- Annabella, Utah — Ann S. Roberts and Isabella Dalton, early settlers
- Annada, Missouri — Ann and Ada Jamison, daughters of Carson Jamison, early settler
- Annelly, Kansas — Ann and Ellie, wife and daughter of a railroad official
- Annfred, West Virginia — Anna and Fred, railway official and wife
- Annis, Idaho — Ann Kearney (first postmistress) and the word "island"
- Arizola, Arizona — Arizona and Ola Thomas, daughter of an early settler
- Artanna, Ohio — Arthur "Art" and Anna Wolfe, store owners
- Arthyde, Minnesota — Arthur and Clyde Hutchins, town founders
- Atolia, California — Atkins and DeGolia, mining company officials
- Austwell, Texas — Preston R. Austin and Jesse C. McDowell, founders
- Berclair, Texas — Bert and Clair Lucas, local ranchers
- Birkbeck, Illinois — two railroad officials: Birk and Beck
- Birome, Texas — Bickham and Jerome Cartwright, brothers, ranchers, landowners
- Broad Park, Indiana — J. C. Broadstreet and Hugh Parker, local landowners
- Brookneal, Virginia — John Brooke and Sarah Neal Brooke, husband and wife, owners of a tobacco warehouse
- Brownfield, Illinois — two prominent local citizens: John Brown and Lewis Field
- Carson, North Dakota — early businessmen: Frank Carter and David and Simon Pederson
- Churchill, Idaho — Church and Hill were common family names among the early settlers
- Clemscott, Oklahoma — Clem Brooks and Scott Sparks
- Coeburn, Virginia — W. W. Coe, Chief Engineer of the N&W RR and Judge W. E. Burns
- Cokesbury, Maryland — Thomas Coke and Francis Asbury, dead bishops
- Colton, Washington - J. A. Cole and Clinton Wolford
- Colver, Pennsylvania — Coleman and Weaver, mine owners
- Como, Missouri — Covey and Moberley, founders (note: not Como, Missouri in New Madrid County)
- Cookson, Saskatchewan — Jack Cook and Albert Hodgson, homesteaders
- Cootehill, County Cavan, Ireland — Thomas Coote and Frances Hill, husband and wife (early name dating from the 17th century)
- Coppereid, Nevada — "copper" and John T. Reid, prospector
- Coxby, Saskatchewan — George Cox and Grandby, Quebec, homesteader and former home
- Craneco, West Virginia — Cole and Crane, a Cincinnati lumber company
- Cresbard, South Dakota — John A. Cressey and Fred Baird, early settlers
- Cuyuna Range, Minnesota – Cuyler Adams and his dog Una, prospectors
- Cynthiana, Kentucky — Cynthia and Anna Harrison, daughters of Robert Harrison, land donor
- Daisetta, Texas — Daisy Barrett and Etta White (early residents)
- Dalkena, Washington — Dalton and Kennedy, mill owners
- Dankin, Saskatchewan — Bob Daniels and Bill King, early settlers
- Davella, Kentucky — postmaster Dave Delong and wife Ella
- Dayhoit, Kentucky — Day (family name and original town name) plus Roy Wilhoit (mine owner)
- Declo, Idaho — Dethles and Cloughly, family names of early settlers
- Denmar, West Virginia — Dennison and Maryland, early settler and his state of origin
- Dewmaine, Illinois — George Dewey, U.S. admiral in the Spanish–American War, and the USS Maine, ship whose destruction precipitated that war
- Donora, Pennsylvania — William Donner and Nora Mellon, wife of banker Andrew W. Mellon
- Doral, Florida - Doris and Alfred Kaskel
- Dorintosh, Saskatchewan — Dorise Nielsen and Cameron Ross McIntosh, successive Members of Parliament for North Battleford
- Dunbar, Kentucky — Dunn and Barrow, two local family names
- Dunbridge, Ohio — Dunn and Trowbridge, early settlers
- Dunrea, Manitoba — Adam Dunlop, postmaster and Thomas Rea, farmer
- Rural Municipality of Eldon No. 471, Saskatchewan — Alexander Elliott and John Albert Gordon, early homesteaders
- Elmonica, Oregon — Eleanor and Monica Stoy, daughters of Sam B. Stoy, early resident and landowner
- Elwin, Illinois — Elwood and Martin, town founders
- Elyria, Ohio — Heman Ely and wife Maria
- Emmalena, Kentucky — Emma Thurman, wife of the petitioner for the post office, and Orlena Combs Morgan, first postmistress
- Emington, Illinois — Emma Marvin, wife of founder William Marvin, and Livingston County
- Faywood, New Mexico — J. C. Fay and William Lockwood, two of three developers
- Felda, Florida — Felix and Ida Taylor, husband and wife
- Floydada, Texas — Floyd County and Ada Price, mother of T. W. Price, local rancher
- Fluvanna County, Virginia — fluvius (Latin, "river") and Anne, Queen of Great Britain
- Frenchglen, Oregon — Peter French and Dr Hugh James Glenn, ranchers
- Geraldton, Ontario — Fitzgerald and Joseph Errington, mine financiers
- Gilsum, New Hampshire — Samuel Gilbert and his son-in-law, Thomas Sumner
- Gladmar, Saskatchewan — Gladstone and Margaret Black, children of first postmaster
- Gladstell, Texas — Gladys and Estell Grogan, the daughters of George and Will Grogan, sawmill owners
- Glenada, Oregon — "glen" plus Ada, for Jane Ada Colter and Ada Colter, wife and daughter of George Colter, town founder
- Glenbain, Saskatchewan — Richard Bruce McBain, JP and Glengarry County, Ontario, his former home
- Glendora, California — "glen" and Ledora Whitcomb, wife of George Whitcomb, town founder
- Gracemont, Oklahoma — Grace and Montgomery, two friends of the first postmaster
- Gragreen, North Dakota —A. H. Gray and D. W. Green, early pioneers
- Grano, North Dakota — either Charles Grace and Lano Robert Ortberg, newspapermen from Mohall ND, or A. D. Greene, railroad official, and Charles Lano, postmaster at Mohall (or possibly from Grain-0 cereal)
- Greenspond, Newfoundland and Labrador — first two families: Green and Pond (very old name dating from the early 1700s)
- Hanfield, Indiana — Hancock and Garfield
- Hargill, Texas — William Apsey Harding and Samuel Lamar Gill, town developers
- Haysi, Virginia — Charles M. Hayter and Otis L. Sifers, store owners
- Hernshaw, West Virginia — Robert Herndon and partner Renshaw, coal mine owners
- Hughton, Saskatchewan — Hugh and Milton Winters, sons of O. O. Winters, first village overseer
- Idabel, Oklahoma — Ida and Belle Purnell, daughters of Isaac Purnell, railroad official
- Idalou, Texas — either Lou and Ida Bacon, early settlers, or Ida and Lou Bassett, daughters of Julian M. Bassett, rancher
- Idana, Kansas — Ida Howland and Anna Broughton, early settlers
- Iraan, Texas — Ira and Ann Yates, local ranchers
- Isaban, West Virginia — Isabel and Ann, persons unknown
- Ismay, Montana — Isabella and May, daughters of a railroad official
- Jan Phyl Village, Florida — Janet and Phyllis, daughters of the founder, Henry Lesnik
- Jerico Springs, Missouri — Jericho (ancient city) and Joseph B. Carrico, settler
- Joetta, Illinois — Joel and Marietta Booz, son-in-law and daughter of James Martin, first postmaster
- Jonancy, Kentucky — Joe Hudson and Nancy Ratliffe, employees (bookkeeper and timekeeper, respectively) of the local coal mining company (Kentucky Block Fuel Company)
- Juliaetta, Idaho — Julia and Etta, daughters of Charles Snyder, the first postmaster
- Kenbridge, Virginia — Kennedy and Bridgeforth, landowners' names
- Kerman, California – W.G. Kerckhoff and Jacob Mansar (promoters)
- Keymar, Maryland — Key, family name (Francis Scott Key was a member) and Maryland
- Kildav, Kentucky — Killebrew and Davis, mine owners
- Knightsen, California – George W. Knight (town founder) and his wife Christina Christensen
- Kormak, Ontario — Charles Korpela and Oscar Maki, lumbermen
- Krydor, Saskatchewan — Peter Krysak and Teodor Lucyk, prominent settlers
- LaBelle, Florida — Laura June and Carrie Belle, daughters of Francis Asbury Hendry, politician and rancher
- Langruth, Manitoba — Langdon and Ruth, landowners
- Lewanna, Nebraska — Lewellen, last name of first postmaster plus Anna, his daughter
- Lanton, Missouri — Lancaster and Sutton, early settlers
- Lawtell, Louisiana — Lawler and Littell, town founders
- Lazbuddie, Texas — D. Luther "Laz" Green and Andrew "Buddie" Sherley, store owners
- Leaday, Texas — J. C. Lea and Mabel Doss Day, ranch owners
- Lillybrook, West Virginia — Lilly and Hornbrook, mine owners
- Lisabeula, Washington — Elisa and Beulah Butts, daughters of the first postmaster
- Livermore, Colorado — Adophus Livernash and Stephen Moore, early settlers
- Mabank, Texas — G. W. Mason and Thomas Eubank, town founders, ranchers
- Macworth, Saskatchewan — McEwen and Elsworth, local families
- Mansfield, Texas — Ralph S. Man and Julian Feild[sic], mill and business owners
- Marchwell, Saskatchewan — Frank M. and Charles H. March and Henry Wells, owners of March Brothers and Wells, a land holding and development company
- Marianna, Florida — Mary and Anna, daughters of town founder Scott Beveridge
- Marietta, Pennsylvania — Mary Cook and Etta Anderson, wives of the founders
- Marshan Township, Dakota County, Minnesota — Michael and Ann Marsh, early settlers
- Martwick, Kentucky — Charles A. Martin and Judge William A. Wickliffe, mine owners
- Marwayne, Alberta — S. C. Marfleet, first postmaster, and Wainfleet, Lincolnshire, England, his original home
- Mary Esther, Florida — daughters of the first postmaster, John Newton
- Maunie, Illinois — Maude Sheridan and Jennie Pumphrey, daughters of early settlers
- Maxstone, Saskatchewan — Alexander Maxwell and Stonehenge, a nearby district
- Meleb, Manitoba — Melnyk, farmer, and Lebman, storekeeper
- Micola, Missouri — Michie and Coleman, founders
- Milden, Saskatchewan — Charles Mills and Robert Bryden, early settlers
- Milfay, Oklahoma — Charles Mills and Edward Fay, railroad officials
- Mindale, Illinois (Schuyler County) — Minnie and Dale Gallaher, general store owners
- Minneola, Kansas — Minnie Davis and Ola Watson, early settlers
- Moronts, Illinois — Moore and Chonts, railroad construction workers
- Naicam, Saskatchewan — Naismith and Cameron, railway construction contractors
- Napfor, Kentucky — Napier, local family name, and Foreman, coal company official
- Nelscott, Oregon — Charles P. Nelson and Dr W. G. Scott, town founders (now part of Lincoln City, Oregon)
- Nicoma Park, Oklahoma — Dr G. A. Nichols, town founder, and Oklahoma
- Noralee, British Columbia — Nora and Lee Newgaard
- Nucrag, Idaho — rail siding and spur on the Camas Prairie Railroad, named for two rail workers: Newton, a conductor, and Craig, an engineer
- Olaton, Kentucky — Ola Wilson and her uncle Joel Payton, the postmaster
- Palco, Kansas — Palmer and Cole, railroad officials
- Palmdale, Minnesota — Frank Palmquist and Ogda Emilia Elmdahl, husband and wife
- Paragould, Arkansas — J. W. Paramore and Jay Gould, railroad owners
- Raljon, Maryland — former name of town where FedExField is located, for Ralph and John, sons of former Washington Redskins owner Jack Kent Cooke
- Raymore, Missouri — George Rae and H. C. Moore, town founders
- Raywick, Kentucky — Ray and Wickliffe, pioneer family names
- Roseglen, North Dakota — "rose" and Glennon, first settlers
- Roselawn, Indiana (originally Rose Lon) — Orlando Rose and Lon Craig, early merchants
- Rosiclare, Illinois — Rose and Clare, daughters of an early settler who were drowned in a boating accident
- Rush Hill, Missouri — town founders: Reusch and Hill
- Ruthilda, Saskatchewan — Ruth and Hilda, daughters of early settler H. Alex Goodwin
- Saidora, Illinois — Sadie and Dora, pioneer women
- Sarona, Wisconsin — combination of Sauer (early settler) plus Sharon plain in Israel
- Scotford, Alberta — Thomas Walter Scott, first premier of Saskatchewan, and Alexander Cameron Rutherford, first premier of Alberta
- Shawswick Township, Lawrence County, Indiana — William Shaw, war hero, and Judge William W. Wick, eminent jurist
- Sherridon, Manitoba — Carl Sherritt and J. Peter Gordon, founders of Sherritt Gordon Mines, Ltd., now Sherritt International Corporation
- Snowflake, Arizona — Erastus Snow and William Jordan Flake, Mormon bishops
- Stronghurst, Illinois — William B. Strong and R. D. Hurst, president and vice president, respectively, of the Santa Fe Railroad
- Valmeyer, Illinois — "valley" and Meyer, local family name
- Veda Lake — lake in the Oregon Cascades, first stocked by Vern Rogers and Dave Donaldson, who the lake was named after
- Vidora, Saskatchewan — Vivian and Dorothy, wife and daughter of J. M. MacArthur, CPR railway official
- WaKeeney, Kansas — Albert Warren and James F. Keeney, real estate developers
- Wallard, Saskatchewan — Charles H. Waller and George Washington Card, first postmaster and first settler, respectively
- Walbert, Missouri — sons of early postmaster: Walter and Herbert Baur
- Wardell, Missouri — R. L. Warren + "dell"
- Wayan, Idaho — Wayne and Ann Nevils, early settlers
- Westlock, Alberta — William Westgate and William Lockhart
- Wilark, Oregon — Wilson and Clark, two families of lumbermen who owned the Clark and Wilson Lumber Company
- Wilfred, Indiana — Wilford and Fredman, coal mining operators
- Wilmont Township, Nobles County, Minnesota — compromise name between Willumet and Lamont (significance of those names unknown)
- Woodmohr, Wisconsin — Woodard, an assemblyman and Lawrence Mohr, early settler
- Zenoria, Louisiana — Zed and Noria, husband and wife, early settlers

== Livestock ==
- Bimble, Kentucky — Bim and Bill, two oxen owned by Will Payne, first postmaster
- Clemretta, British Columbia — Clementine and Henrietta, two cows owned by the first postmaster

== Other portmanteaus ==
- Acmar, Alabama — Acton and Margaret, two other Alabama towns with mines owned by the same company
- Algoma (various places with this name, such as Algoma District, Ontario) — Algonquian and goma, derived from -gamaa (Algonquian: "lake"); coined by Henry Rowe Schoolcraft
- Alkabo, North Dakota — "alkali" and "gumbo", two types of soil in the area
- Aquadeo, Saskatchewan — "aquatics" and "rodeo"
- Arenac County, Michigan — arena (Latin: "sand") and auke (Algonquian: "place"); coined by Henry Rowe Schoolcraft
- Arrowbear Lake, California, a small community halfway between Lake Arrowhead and Big Bear Lake in the San Bernardino mountains.
- Ashton, Maryland — Ashland and Clifton, two nearby estates
- Bellevyria, North Dakota — Bellevue, Ohio and Elyria, Ohio, original homes of two early settlers
- Belmopan, Belize — Belize River and the Mopan River
- Bethalto, Illinois — Bethel, original name of the town, and Alton, nearby town
- Borosolvay, California — Pacific Coast Borax Company and the Solvay Process Company
- BosWash or BosNYWash, terms occasionally used for the chain of interlocking coastal metropolitan areas (stretching from Boston in the north to Washington, D.C. in the south) that make up the Northeast megalopolis.
- Bralorne, British Columbia — Bralco and Lorne (name of the mine); Bralco is a company name coined by combining BRitish, ALberta, and COlumbia
- Calistoga, California — California and Saratoga
- Canoat, Saskatchewan — Canadian oats
- Canwood, Saskatchewan — Canadian woodlands
- Carcross, Yukon — Caribou Crossing
- Carlea, Saskatchewan — Carrot and Leather Rivers flow together near the town
- Carway, Alberta — Cardston and "highway"
- Centrahoma, Oklahoma — central Oklahoma
- Clackamette Cove — Clackamas River and Willamette River, an inlet along the Clackamas River near the confluence. Also called Clackamette Lake. Clackamette Park is nearby.
- Clearco, West Virginia — Clear Creek Coal Company
- Colora, Maryland — culmen and aura (Latin: "ridge", "breeze")
- Crekola, Oklahoma — Creek (tribe) and Oklahoma
- Dacoma, Oklahoma — Dakota (tribe) and Oklahoma
- Dakem, North Dakota — North Dakota and Emmons County
- Delanco, New Jersey — Delaware River and Rancocas Creek
- Delanson, New York — Delaware and Hudson
- Delawanna station (New Jersey Transit stop in Clifton, New Jersey) — Delaware, Lackawanna and Western Railroad
- Donavon, Saskatchewan — Don River (Ontario) and Avon River (Ontario)
- Echola, Alabama — "echo" and Alabama
- Enehoe, Oklahoma — last letters of Cheyenne and Arapaho
- Flagami, Miami, Florida — neighbourhood around Flagler Street and Tamiami Canal
- Gascozark, Missouri — Gasconade River and Ozarks
- Glentana, Montana — "glen" and Montana
- Golburn, Saskatchewan — "goldenrod" and "burning"
- Granisle, British Columbia — Granby Mining Company and "isle", for McDonald Island where its mine was located
- Haybro, Colorado — Hayden brothers, coal operators
- Idahome, Idaho — Idaho and "home"
- Indiahoma, Oklahoma — Indian and Oklahoma, a portmanteau which most likely honors the area's Native-American roots
- Indialantic, Florida — between the Indian River (Florida) and the Atlantic Ocean
- Indrio, Florida — Indian River (Florida) and rio (Spanish: "river")
- Irrigon, Oregon — "irrigation" and Oregon
- Lake Itasca, Minnesota — veritas and caput (Latin: "truth", "head"); coined by Henry Rowe Schoolcraft
- Kanwaka, Kansas — Kansas and Wakarusa Rivers
- Lempom, California — "lemon" and "pomegranate"
- Linwood, Michigan — "line" and "wood"
- Lorwood, Missouri — Lorain County, Ohio and Wood County, Ohio, original homes of three mill owners
- Marfrance, West Virginia — Margaret and Frances, two coal mining companies
- Millux, California — Miller & Lux, stock-raising firm
- Miloma, Minnesota — two railroads: the Milwaukee Road (Chicago, Milwaukee, St. Paul and Pacific Railroad), and the Omaha Road (Chicago, St. Paul, Minneapolis & Omaha Railway)
- Lake Mohawksin, Wisconsin — last syllables of the three rivers that flow into the lake: the Somo, the Tomahawk and the Wisconsin
- Norlina, North Carolina — "North" and "Carolina" - a town in Warren County, North Carolina near the state's northern border with Virginia.
- Oaknolia, Louisiana — "oak" and "magnolia", trees growing in the area
- Okeelanta, Florida — Lake Okeechobee and Atlantic Ocean
- Okeene, Oklahoma — the last syllables of Cherokee and Cheyenne
- Oklaunion, Texas — Oklahoma and "union"
- Orlovista, Florida — Orlando and vista (Spanish: "view")
- Orovada, Nevada — oro (Spanish: "gold") and Nevada
- Oscoda County, Michigan — ossin and muscoda (Algonquian: "pebble", "prairie"); coined by Henry Rowe Schoolcraft
- Palwaukee Municipal Airport — Palatine Road and Milwaukee Avenue in Cook County, Illinois; now renamed Chicago Executive Airport
- Penndel, Pennsylvania — named after the Pennsylvania/Delaware Highway
- Penn Yan, New York — Pennsylvania and Yankee
- Riverhurst, Saskatchewan — Riverside and Boldenhurst, two nearby post offices
- Rondowa, Oregon — from Grande Ronde River and Wallowa River
- Salvisa, Kentucky — located between Salt River and Levisa River (former name of Kentucky River)
- Sanganois State Fish and Wildlife Area, Illinois — Sangamon River and Illinois
- Camp Saskadet — Saskatchewan and "cadet"; military campground for training of cadets, near Kelvington, Saskatchewan
- Solromar, California — sol, oro, and mar (Spanish: "sun", "gold", and "sea")
- Shewag Creek and Shewag Lake, Idaho — in between Sheep Creek and Wagonhammer Creek
- Sylmar, Los Angeles, California — silva and mare (Latin: "forest" and "sea")
- Tamiami, Florida — Tampa to Miami
- Tehrangeles — Tehran and Los Angeles
- Transcona, Winnipeg, Manitoba — Transcontinental Railway and Strathcona (for Donald Smith, Lord Strathcona)
- Uravan, Colorado — "uranium" and "vanadium"
- Valsetz, Oregon — Valley and Siletz Railroad
- Vansterdam — Vancouver and Amsterdam
- Walland, Tennessee — Walton and England, from the Walton and England Leather Co. which established a tannery there.
- Weskan, Kansas — western Kansas
- Winnitoba railway station, Manitoba — Winnipeg and Manitoba
- Woolaroc — museum and game preserve in Oklahoma; name is a blend of "woods" "lakes" and "rocks"

== See also ==
- List of portmanteaus
- List of geographic acronyms and initialisms
- List of geographic anagrams and ananyms
