= Cal Neva =

Cal Neva or Calneva may refer to:

- Club Cal Neva in Reno, Nevada
- Cal Neva Lodge & Casino in Crystal Bay, Nevada
- Calneva, California

== See also ==
- Cal-Nev-Ari, Nevada
