= List of killings by law enforcement officers in the United States, July 2022 =

This is a list of people reported killed by non-military law enforcement officers in the United States in July 2022, whether in the line of duty or not, and regardless of reason or method. The listing documents the occurrence of a death, making no implications regarding wrongdoing or justification on the part of the person killed or officer involved. Killings are arranged by date of the incident that caused death. Different death dates, if known, are noted in the description. The table below lists 80 people.

== July 2022 ==
Date	Name (age) of deceased	Race of deceased	Location	Description
2022-07-31	Darrin Baker (56)	Black	Greenfield, IN	
2022-07-31	Joseph Torres (35)	Hispanic	Ingleside, TX	
2022-07-30	Adam Mostafa Youines (35)	White	Pasadena, CA	
2022-07-30	Charles White (48)	White	Lorain, OH	
2022-07-30	Kevin Hargraves-Shird (31)	Black	Washington, DC	
2022-07-30	Joshua Clayton Hippler (27)	White	Rochester, Minnesota	A man armed with an ax, who was a suspect in a recent business robbery, was fatally shot by police early in the morning on July 30.
2022-07-30	Bobby James Brown (41)	Black	Jacksonville, FL	
2022-07-30	Daniel Bruce (39)	White	Sundance, WY	
2022-07-30	Name Withheld ()	White	Port Richey, FL	
2022-07-30	Mark Allen (67)	White	Canton, GA	
2022-07-29	Dante Kittrell	Black	South Bend, Indiana	Police responded to a call of a man with a gun in a field near a school. Kitrrell did not have a gun when police arrived, and during a 40 minute standoff, he told police he wanted to kill them and kill himself. Kittrell then pulled a gun and pointed it at the ground and in the air, and was shot dead when he pointed it at officers. The gun was a replica Glock.
2022-07-29	David Pelaez Chavez (36)	Hispanic	Healdsburg, CA	
2022-07-28	Patrick Wayne Cater (52)	Asian	Summersville, West Virginia	Cater shot and killed a pair of married coworkers at the nail salon he worked at before being killed by police.
2022-07-27	Aaron Stanton	Unknown	Portland, Oregon	
2022-07-27	Kyle Dail (30)	Black	Dallas, TX	
2022-07-27	Marcos Maldonado (31)	Hispanic	Los Angeles, CA	
2022-07-27	Susana Morales (16)	Hispanic	Norcross, GA	
2022-07-26	Marvin Moran Jr	Unknown race	Rapid City, SD	
2022-07-26	Name Withheld	Unknown race	Palacios, TX	
2022-07-25	Sean C. McCormick (64)	White	Strasburg, VA	
2022-07-25	Daniel Robert Strange (51)	White	Waterloo, SC	
2022-07-25	Jeremiah C. Jones (38)	White	Table Grove, IL	
2022-07-25	Tyrone Jones (38)	Unknown race	Jackson, MS	
2022-07-24	Cody Bennett (29)	White	Monongahela, PA	
2022-07-24	William Whitfield (42)	White	Benton, AR	
2022-07-24	Johnathan Worth (19)	White	Portland, Oregon	Officers responded to a call for a man and a woman fighting. While attempting to arrest the man, he fired a shot. An officer returned fire, hitting and killing the suspect.
2022-07-24	Jonathan Huertas Reyes (32)	Hispanic	Tampa, FL	
2022-07-22	Jay Jackson (49)	White	Moreno Valley, California	Police responded to a report that a man with a gun was threatening to shoot someone. When deputies arrived they encountered Jackson, who allegedly told them he had a gun and had a hand in his pocket. When Jackson pulled a metal object out and charged police, a deputy shot him. Jackson was holding a Gillette razor.
2022-07-21	Raymond Chaluisant (18)	Black	New York City, New York	An off-duty corrections officer shot and killed Chaluisant in The Bronx after he fired an Orbeez gun at his back. The corrections officer did not report the shooting and was charged with murder and manslaughter.
2022-07-17	Sofia Molina (12)	Unknown	Las Vegas, Nevada	A North Las Vegas officer shot his wife, son, and daughter before killing himself. His wife and son survived, while his daughter was killed.
2022-07-16	Robert Marquise Adams (23)	Black	San Bernardino, California	Adams was in the parking lot outside an illegal gambling operation (he was convicted in March 2022 of robbing a similar operation on the same block). Police responding to a report of a man with a gun in the parking lot, and found Adams "pulling something from his waistband". Adams fled from police and was shot dead because police believed he was "taking cover behind parked cars to shoot at them". Police recovered a loaded gun with a bullet in the chamber.
2022-07-15	Trent William Millsap	White	Anaheim, California	Millsap, suspected of stabbing NASCAR driver Bobby East to death in Westminster, was shot and killed by police during his arrest. Few details were released, other than that a police dog suffered a non-life-threatening gunshot wound and that Millsap was unarmed when he was shot.
2022-07-14	Andrew Tekle Sundberg (20)	Black	Minneapolis, Minnesota	At 9:30 p.m. on July 13 at the 900 block of 21st Avenue in the Seward neighborhood, Minneapolis police responded to reports of shots being fired from one apartment unit into another. Police that arrived at the scene observed more shots being fired through interior walls and evacuated the apartment building. A six-hour standoff ensued with Sundberg, the alleged assailant, who police also claim fired at officers. At about 4:30 a.m. on July 14, two police snipers fired their rifles, fatally wounding Sundberg. Hennepin County Attorney Michael O. Freeman concluded in a report released on December 21, 2022, that the police officers' actions were legally justified and no charges would be filed against them.
2022-07-14	Maurice "Corey" McCarthy Hughes (45)	Black	Hattiesburg, MS	
2022-07-14	Brian Keith McKinney ()	Unknown race	Ontario, CA	
2022-07-13	Matthew Hyde (36)	Black	Hollywood, FL	
2022-07-13	Timothy Ostrander (31)	White	Carthage, IL	
2022-07-13	Malachi Lavar Carroll (20)	Black	Highland Springs, VA	
2022-07-13	Curtis Dale Barnett (60)	Unknown race	Salinas, CA	
2022-07-13	Robert "Bobby" Fletemier-Brown (16)	Hispanic	Salem, OR	
2022-07-13	Romayne Manuel (31)	Black	Grand Prairie, TX	
2022-07-14	Paul David Chavez (30)	Hispanic	Modesto, California	Police responded to a call by Chavez's father-in-law reporting Chavez was threatening him and ripping off a screen door. Officers shot and tased Chavez, who was allegedly holding a tow hitch that was never referred to as a weapon.
2022-07-13	Gloria Melton (77)	Black	Gary, IN	
2022-07-13	Name Withheld (45)	Unknown race	Houston, TX	
2022-07-13	Michael Silletto (26)	Black	Denver, CO	
2022-07-12	Thomas Cromwell (27)	White	Mason, OH	
2022-07-12	Mark Evers (65)	White	Clearcreek, OH	
2022-07-11	Terrill Anton Jones (32)	Black	Tucson, AZ	
2022-07-10	Madeline Miller (64)	Black	Flossmoor, IL	
2022-07-10	Cardell Crawford (24)	Black	Kansas CIty, MO	
2022-07-09	Raul Hardy (60)	Hispanic	Queens, NY	
2022-07-09	Malik Williams (19)	Black	Brooklyn, NY	
2022-07-09	Jaime Rodriguez (42)	Hispanic	Long Beach, CA	
2022-07-09	Dillon E Walker (31)	Unknown race	Cave City, KY	
2022-07-09	Mack Lee (27)	Black	Colorado Springs, CO	
2022-07-08	Shane Netterville (28)	Native American	Fargo, North Dakota	Police responded to reports of three men slumped over in a van. Two of the men fled on foot, while an officer shot Netterville after he allegedly drove towards the officer.
2022-07-08	Roderick Brooks (47)	Black	Houston, Texas	A deputy responded to a report of a man shoplifting and shoving an employee at a Dollar General. The deputy encountered Brooks and restrained and tased him, before shooting him in the back of the head during the struggle. Bodycam footage shows Brooks had grabbed the dropped taser, but did not point it at the officer and had let go of it when the deputy shot him.
2022-07-07	Jasper Aaron Lynch (26)	White	McLean, Virginia	Police responded to a report of a man in crisis. Lynch, a trans man, allegedly threw a tribal mask at officers and ran after them swinging a bottle. Police tased and shot Lynch multiple times, killing him.
2022-07-07	Brett Rosenau (15)	Black	Albuquerque, New Mexico	During a standoff with 27-year-old Qiaunt Kelley, police threw a pepper spray canister into the home where the standoff occurred. A fire broke out on a mattress, which started a house fire. In the ensuing blaze, Kelley exited the house, while Rosenau, who had entered the house with him, stayed inside and died of smoke inhalation. A representative for Albuquerque Fire Rescue stated that all other possible ignition sources had been deemed impossible and that the pepper spray canister was the most likely cause of the fire.
2022-07-07	Nathaniel James Gomez (33)	Hispanic	Safford, AZ	
2022-07-07	Raphael Esteban Ramirez (26)	Hispanic	Marietta, GA	
2022-07-07	Felipe Guerrero (36)	Hispanic	Los Angeles, CA	
2022-07-06	Matthew Scott Jones (36)	White	Beckley, West Virginia	
2022-07-06	Jerry Lee Esparza (38)	Unknown	Beeville, Texas	
2022-07-06	Juan Carlos Bojorquez (15)	Hispanic	Glendale, Arizona	
2022-07-06	Ehmani Mack Davis (19)	Black	Detroit, Michigan	
2022-07-05	Trevon Darion Hull (21)	Black	Port Neches, Texas	
2022-07-05	James Lee Spears Howard (36)	White	Davella, Kentucky	
2022-07-05	Raudnesia J. Waring (24)	Black	North Charleston, South Carolina	
2022-07-05	Chanin Emil Mayfield (32)	Black	Toccoa, Georgia	
2022-07-05	Reginald Humphrey (31)	Black	Wilmington, California	
2022-07-03	Glenn Nisich (57)	White	Sioux Falls, South Dakota	
2022-07-03	James "Brian" Parks (44)	White	Warner Robins, Georgia	
2022-07-03	Bryan W. Humble (63)	Unknown race	Chaparral, New Mexico	
2022-07-03	Miguel Gallarzo (46)	Hispanic	Las Vegas, Nevada	
2022-07-02	Name Withheld (30)	Unknown race	Huntington Park, California	
2022-07-02	Jesus Rodolfo Torres (30)	Hispanic	Los Angeles, California	Two officers were patrolling South Los Angeles when they encountered Torres, who appeared to have a bulge in his pants that resembled a gun. The officers ordered Torres to stop and remove his hands from his pockets, but he walked away from them. One officer shot Torres with a foam projectile, causing him to drop a gun, and ten officers shot him when he reached to pick it up. Police Chief Michel Moore stated that a sergeant and five officers violated department policy in the shooting.
2022-07-02	Michael Moore (75)	White	Sacramento, California	
2022-07-02	Ponciano Alvarez-Guzman	Hispanic	Denver, Colorado	
2022-07-01	Jada Elizabeth Johnson (22)	Black	Fayetteville, North Carolina	

== See also ==
- Death in custody § United States
- Henry A. Wallace Police Crime Public Database
- List of cases of police brutality
- List of countries with annual rates and counts for killings by law enforcement officers
- List of law enforcement officers killed in the line of duty in the United States
- List of law enforcement officers convicted for an on-duty killing in the United States
- List of shootings by US immigration agents
- List of police reforms related to the George Floyd protests
- List of unarmed African Americans killed by law enforcement officers in the United States
- Lists of killings by law enforcement officers
- Police brutality in the United States
- Police misconduct § United States
- Police riot § United States
- Police use of deadly force in the United States
