= Madison, Saskatchewan =

Community in Saskatchewan, Canada

Madison
- Unincorporated community
- Location of Madison in Saskatchewan Madison (Canada)
- Coordinates: 51.216821°N 109.024130°W
- Country: Canada
- Province: Saskatchewan
- Region: Southwest
- Census division: 8
- Rural municipality: Newcombe No. 260

Government
  - Governing body: RM of Newcombe No. 260

Area
  - Land: 0.46 km^{2} (0.18 sq mi)

Population (2001)
  - Total: 10
  - Density: 21.7/km^{2} (56/sq mi)
- Area code: 306
- Highways: Highway 44
- Railways: Big Sky Rail (formerly CN)

Madison is an unincorporated community in the Rural Municipality of Newcombe No. 260, Saskatchewan, Canada. The community had a population of 10 in 2001. It previously held the status of village until February 1, 1998. The hamlet is located 20 kilometres (12 mi) west of the town of Eston on Highway 44 along the Canadian National Railway subdivision.

== History ==
Prior to February 1, 1998, Madison was incorporated as a village, and was restructured as a hamlet under the jurisdiction of the RM of Newcombe No. 260 that date.

== See also ==
- List of communities in Saskatchewan
- List of hamlets in Saskatchewan
