= Madison no. 8 mine Dewmaine IL =

Madison #8 Mine
- Location within Illinois
- Location: Illinois, United States; 37°46′50″N 89°04′37″W
- Products: Coal
- Type: Coal
- Greatest depth: 100 feet
- Opened: 1890
- Active
- Closed: 1923
- Company: Madison Coal Company

Madison #8 mine is a closed coal mine that was located in Dewmaine, Illinois. Samuel T. Brush, a founder of the city of Carbondale and owner of the St. Louis and Big Muddy Coal Company, opened the mine near the village in 1890. The mine was originally named the Captain Brush Mine.

A mine strike in 1898 led Brush to recruiter the African-American miners from Virginia and Tennessee to work in the mine.

Brush sold the St. Louis and Big Muddy Coal Company to Madison Coal Corporation in 1905. The Madison #8 mine was closed in 1923. In its history the mine produced 8,928,389 tons of coal.

At one time, Madison #8 was the highest-producing mine in Illinois. In addition to African-Americans, the mine was worked by numerous European immigrants including Polish, Russians, Czechoslovaks, and Rusyns.

== Location ==
The former mine entrance is located just north of Rizwood Lane, northeast of the former center of the village of Dewmaine.
