= Dankin =

- Unincorporated community
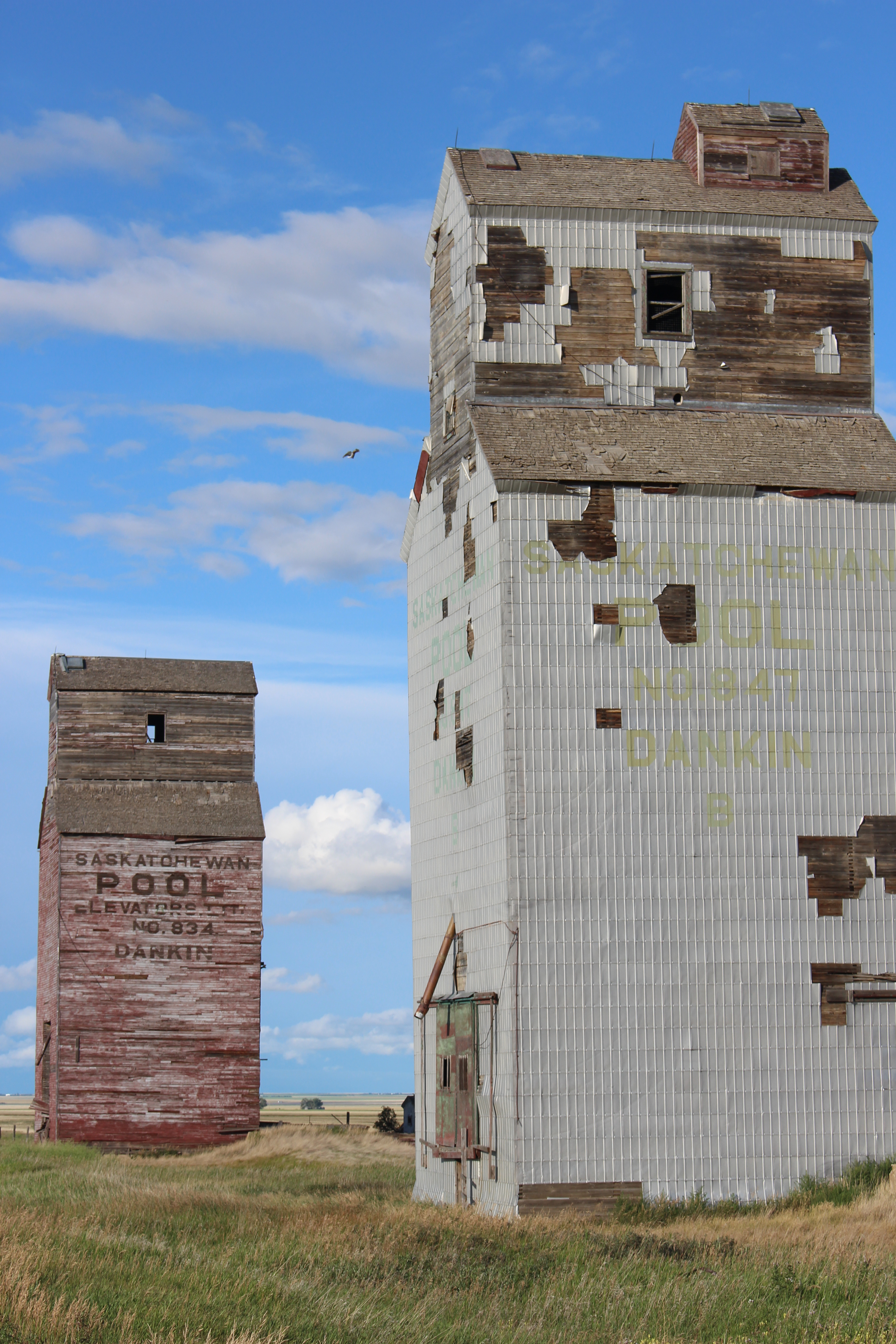
- Former Saskatchewan Wheat Pool No. 834 and "B" grain elevators in Dankin.

- Location of Dankin in Saskatchewan
- Coordinates: 51.224334°N 109.280246°W
- Country: Canada
- Province: Saskatchewan
- Region: Southwest Saskatchewan
- Census division: 8
- Rural Municipality: Newcombe

Government
  - Governing body: Rural Municipality of Newcombe No. 260

Population (2016)
  - Total: 0
- Area code: 306
- Highways: Highway 44
- Railways: Canadian Pacific Railway

Dankin is an unincorporated community in Newcombe Rural Municipality No. 260, Saskatchewan, Canada. The community is located 9 km east of the Town of Eatonia on highway 44 along the Canadian National Railway subdivision. The name "Dankin" is a combination of the last names of Bob Daniels and Bill King, early settlers in the area.

== See also ==
- List of communities in Saskatchewan
- List of geographic names derived from portmanteaus
