= Ruthilda, Saskatchewan =

Unincorporated in Saskatchewan, Canada

Ruthilda
- Unincorporated
- Location within Saskatchewan Location within Canada
- Coordinates: 51.533467°N 108.280547°W
- Country: Canada
- Province: Saskatchewan
- Region: Southwest
- Census division: 13
- Rural municipality: Grandview No. 349
- Dissolved: December 31, 2013

Area
  - Total: 0.67 km^{2} (0.26 sq mi)

Population (2006)
  - Total: 5
  - Density: 7.5/km^{2} (19/sq mi)
  - Dwellings: 3
- Time zone: CST
- Postal code: S0K 3S0
- Area code: 306
- Highways: Highway 51

Ruthilda is a former village in the Rural Municipality of Grandview No. 349, Saskatchewan, Canada. It dissolved from village status to become part of the RM of Grandview No. 349 on December 31, 2013. Ruthilda is located about 5 kilometres (3.1 mi) south of Highway 51 approximately 30 kilometres (19 mi) southwest of the town of Biggar.

The name is a blend of Ruth and Hilda, daughters of H. Alex Goodwin, an early settler.

== History ==
The first homesteaders arrived in the district as early as 1905. Among the first to settle in the district were Charles Fraser, Harry Hobbs, James Bowden, Harry Hannah, Bert Pugh, Tom Veitch and son Guy; George and Edward Goldie, J. Sanders and sons, John Nyquist and sons, and Alex Scott. In 1910 a site for a railway station and town site was surveyed. The village was given its name after the two daughters of Alex Goodwin, Ruth and Hilda.

The Grand Trunk Pacific Railway built the grade for the track in 1911; in 1912 the rails were laid and the Ruthilda train station was built. A post office was officially established on November 1, 1912. Other businesses soon followed. Construction continued through 1914 when the Ruthilda school was built. That same year, two new grain elevators were erected.

On February 3, 1921 the village of Ruthilda was incorporated. A couple of years later, the Saskatchewan Wheat Pool erected a third grain elevator. Despite the community's small size, in 1925 it fielded one of the province's most formidable baseball teams. A United Church was built in 1928 to give parishioners who had previously worshipped in a variety of places, including; private homes, the lumberyard, the school and the community hall. A second church, Glad Tidings Gospel, was open from 1936 until it closed in 1956. Several fires tore through Ruthilda over the years — in 1926, 1936, 1951, and 1959.

Despite reaching a peak population of 114 in 1931, the end was already in site for the community. In 1947, one of the grain elevators was dismantled. The town still had two grain elevators in operation in the late 1970s; however the rail line was abandoned in the mid-1980s. Today, there are no elevators in Ruthilda. The Ruthilda school was closed in 1964. Children were bused to the nearby community of Plenty. Population decline soon followed. In 1966 the community had 85 residents, however, by 1971 that number had fallen to 48. Business closures quickly followed. Today, there are only five residents and no businesses left in the community.

== Spring Water Hutterite Colony ==
The Spring Water Hutterite Colony was founded in 1982 near Ruthilda as a division from the Valley View Hutterite Colony in Linden, Alberta. In 2017 the Spring Water Hutterite Colony became a member of Dariusleut group.

== Demographics ==
In the 2021 Census of Population conducted by Statistics Canada, Ruthilda had a population of 10 living in 4 of its 5 total private dwellings, a change of 100% from its 2016 population of 5. With a land area of 0.69 km^{2} (0.27 sq mi), it had a population density of 14.5/km^{2} (37.5/sq mi) in 2021.

== Gallery ==
Water tower in Ruthilda

Garage in Ruthilda

== See also ==
- List of communities in Saskatchewan
- List of villages in Saskatchewan
- List of geographic names derived from portmanteaus
