= Rural Municipality of Newcombe No. 260 =

Rural municipality in Saskatchewan, Canada

Newcombe No. 260
- Rural municipality
- Rural Municipality of Newcombe No. 260
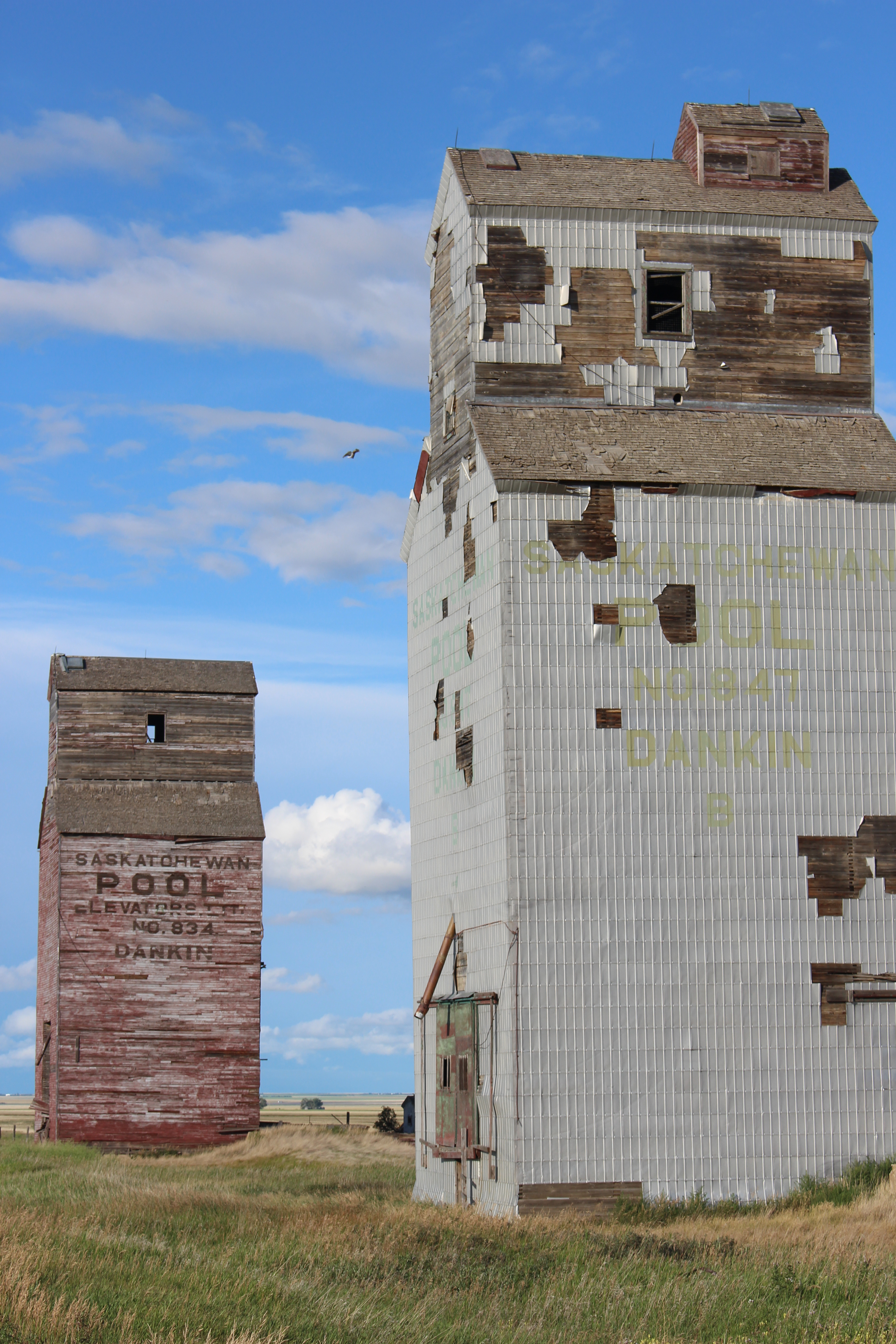
- Old grain elevators in Dankin

- Location of the RM of Newcombe No. 260 in Saskatchewan
- Coordinates: 51.042°N 109.111°W
- Country: Canada
- Province: Saskatchewan
- Census division: 8
- SARM division: 3
- Formed: December 11, 1911

Government
  - Reeve: Ken McBride
  - Governing body: RM of Newcombe No. 260 Council
  - Administrator: Monica Buddecke
  - Office location: Glidden

Area (2016)
  - Land: 1,075.6 km^{2} (415.3 sq mi)

Population (2016)
  - Total: 342
  - Density: 0.3/km^{2} (0.78/sq mi)
- Time zone: CST
  - Summer (DST): CST
- Area codes: 306 and 639

The Rural Municipality of Newcombe No. 260 (2016 population: 342) is a rural municipality (RM) in the Canadian province of Saskatchewan within Census Division No. 8 and SARM Division No. 3. It is located in the west-central portion of the province.

== History ==
The RM of Newcombe No. 260 incorporated as a rural municipality on December 11, 1911. It is named after Allan Simpson Newcombe who played a leadership role in establishing the Boston Colony of immigrants from Massachusetts.

Heritage properties

There is one designated heritage property in the RM.

- Ukrainian Catholic Parish of St. John the Baptist - Constructed in 1944 the church is located 20 km southwest of Kindersley. The site also contains a one-room school that was related to the site in 1961 for use as a church hall. Religious services were last conducted at the church in 1986.

== Geography ==
=== Communities and localities ===
The following unincorporated communities are within the RM.

Localities

- Dankin
- Glidden (dissolved as a village, October 19, 2000)
- Inglenook
- Madison (dissolved as a village, February 1, 1998)
- Sandgren

== Demographics ==
Population history (1981–2016)
| Year | Pop. | ±% |
|---|---|---|
| 1981 | 444 | — |
| 1986 | 419 | −5.6% |
| 1991 | 368 | −12.2% |
| 1996 | 349 | −5.2% |
| 2001 | 405 | +16.0% |
| 2006 | 361 | −10.9% |
| 2011 | 400 | +10.8% |
| 2016 | 342 | −14.5% |
Source: Statistics Canada via Saskatchewan Bureau of Statistics

In the 2021 Census of Population conducted by Statistics Canada, the RM of Newcombe No. 260 had a population of 356 living in 110 of its 133 total private dwellings, a change of 4.1% from its 2016 population of 342. With a land area of 1,094.64 km^{2} (422.64 sq mi), it had a population density of 0.3/km^{2} (0.8/sq mi) in 2021.

In the 2016 Census of Population, the RM of Newcombe No. 260 recorded a population of 342 living in 112 of its 119 total private dwellings, a −14.5% change from its 2011 population of 400. With a land area of 1,075.6 km^{2} (415.3 sq mi), it had a population density of 0.3/km^{2} (0.8/sq mi) in 2016.

== Government ==
The RM of Newcombe No. 260 is governed by an elected municipal council and an appointed administrator that meets on the second Thursday of every month. The reeve of the RM is Ken McBride while its administrator is Monica Buddecke. The RM's office is located in Glidden.

== Transportation ==
The RM is at the intersection of Highway 21 and Highway 44. The Lemsford Ferry is located within the RM.
