= Manasota, Florida =

- Unincorporated community
- Manasota
- Location within the state of Florida
- Coordinates: 27°00′55″N 82°24′09″W
- Country: United States
- State: Florida
- County: Sarasota
- Elevation: 10 ft (3.0 m)
- Time zone: UTC-5 (EST)
  - Summer (DST): UTC-4 (EDT)
- Area code: 941
- FIPS code: 12-42720
- GNIS feature ID: 286345

Manasota is an unincorporated community in Sarasota County, Florida, United States, located on the mainland south of Venice. The Manasota Bridge (County Road 774) crosses Lemon Bay (Gulf Intracoastal Waterway), connecting Manasota to Manasota Beach and Manasota Key. It is home to a United States Postal Service processing and distribution center for Manatee and Sarasota counties.
