= Dewmaine, Illinois =

- Unincorporated community
- Location within Illinois Location within the United States
- Coordinates: 37°46′50″N 89°04′37″W
- Country: United States
- State: Illinois
- County: Williamson
- Elevation: 430 ft (130 m)
- Time zone: UTC-6 (Central (CST))
  - Summer (DST): UTC-5 (CDT)
- ZIP Code: 62918
- Area code: 618
- GNIS feature ID: 407173

Dewmaine was an unincorporated African-American coal-mining community in Williamson County, Illinois. Today the area is almost completely non-residential and vacant land, though it now sits at the northern edge of Carterville. Its name is an amalgamation of Admiral Dewey and the USS Maine from the Spanish–American War.

A post office was established at Dewmaine in 1901, and remained in operation until 1931. It is now served by the Carterville post office. Estimated population in 1958 was 50.

A school, two churches, and several stores existed in the town. The school was open from 1910-1929.

Dewmaine was located a mile north of Carterville on the Carterville—Colp Road.

== Coal mining ==
Samuel T. Brush a founder of the city of Carbondale and owner of the St. Louis and Big Muddy Coal Company opened the Captain Brush Mine in the town in 1890.

The United Mine Workers of America was organized in 1890 however the price of coal dropped. Mine operators in the region lowered wages lower than the price of coal, leading to union strikes. By 1897 then national union had grown stronger and had over 50,000 members. The union organized at the Dewmaine Mine in 1898, and in April of that year the union led a strike over low wages.

A mine strike in 1898 led Brush to recruite African-American miners from Virginia and Sweetwater, Tennessee to work in the mine.

By 1897, the Dewmaine Mine became top coal producing mine in the state of Illinois. After that, production dropped and continued to do so. Brush sold the St. Louis and Big Muddy Coal Company to Madison Coal Corporation in 1905 and the mine was renamed the Madison #8 mine in 1906. The new company recognized the union. The African-American miners were allowed to keep their jobs on the provision that they joined the union.

The Madison #8 mine was closed in 1923.

In addition to African-Americans, the mine was worked by numerous European immigrants including Polish, Russians, Czechoslovaks, and Rusyns.
