= Denmar, West Virginia =

Unincorporated community in West Virginia, United States

- Unincorporated community
- Location within West Virginia Location within the United States
- Coordinates: 38°05′10″N 80°13′20″W
- Country: United States
- State: West Virginia
- County: Pocahontas
- Elevation: 2,090 ft (640 m)
- Time zone: UTC-5 (Eastern (EST))
  - Summer (DST): UTC-4 (EDT)
- Area codes: 304 & 681
- GNIS feature ID: 1554289

Denmar is an unincorporated community in Pocahontas County, West Virginia, United States. Denmar is 3.5 miles (5.6 km) south-southwest of Hillsboro.

The name Denmar is an amalgamation of Dennison and Maryland, the later the native state of the former, a first settler.
