= Coppereid, Nevada =

- Ghost town
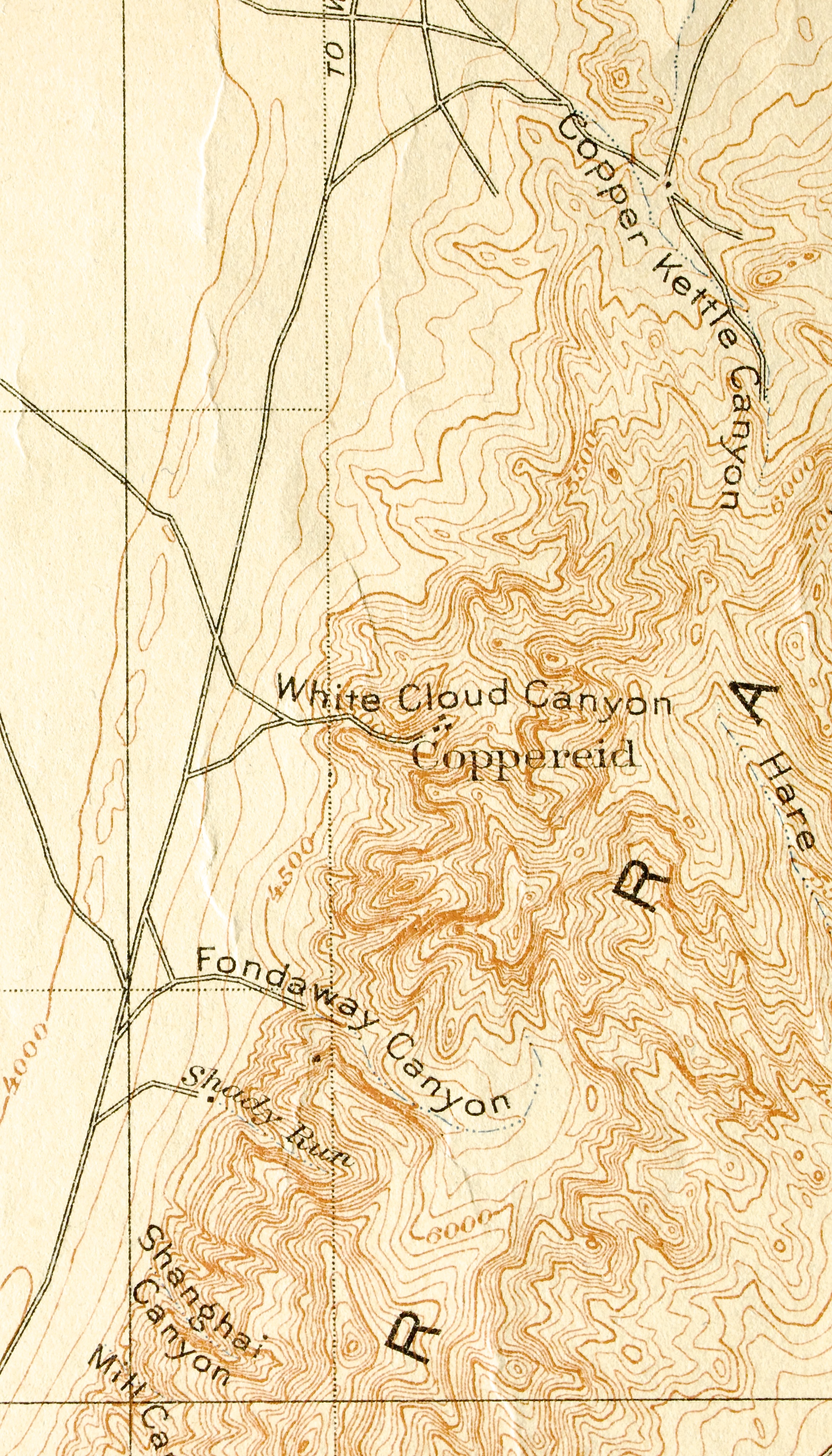
- Detail from 1910 USGS map of White Cloud Canyon and Coppereid

- Location within Nevada Location within the United States
- Coordinates: 39°50′56″N 118°11′28″W
- Country: United States
- State: Nevada
- County: Churchill
- Elevation: 4,147 ft (1,264 m)

Coppereid, also known as White Cloud City is a ghost town in Churchill County, Nevada. It had a total population of 40 people. The site of Coppereid is south of Lovelock, east of the Carson Sink in the Stillwater Range.

== Soil ==
Coppereid has very soft, shallow, and well drained soils. They are found on mountain slopes. They are mostly dry throughout the year, except for Winter, where they become moist.

== History ==
From 1893 to 1896, a small copper smelter was in operation.

Coppereid was named after John T. Reid. Coppereid had a post office from April 1907 to June 1914.

On December 2, 1909, Fallon became the supply for the site due to the fact that it was closer than Lovelock.
