= Moark, Missouri =

Extinct town in Dunklin County, Missouri

Coordinates: 36°22′57″N 89°59′20″W

Moark is an extinct town in Dunklin County, in the U.S. state of Missouri. The GNIS classifies it as a populated place.

A post office called Moark was established in 1900, and remained in operation until 1905. The community derives its name from the Missouri-Arkansas Lumber Company.
