= Michillinda Lodge =

Summer resort in Whitehall, Michigan

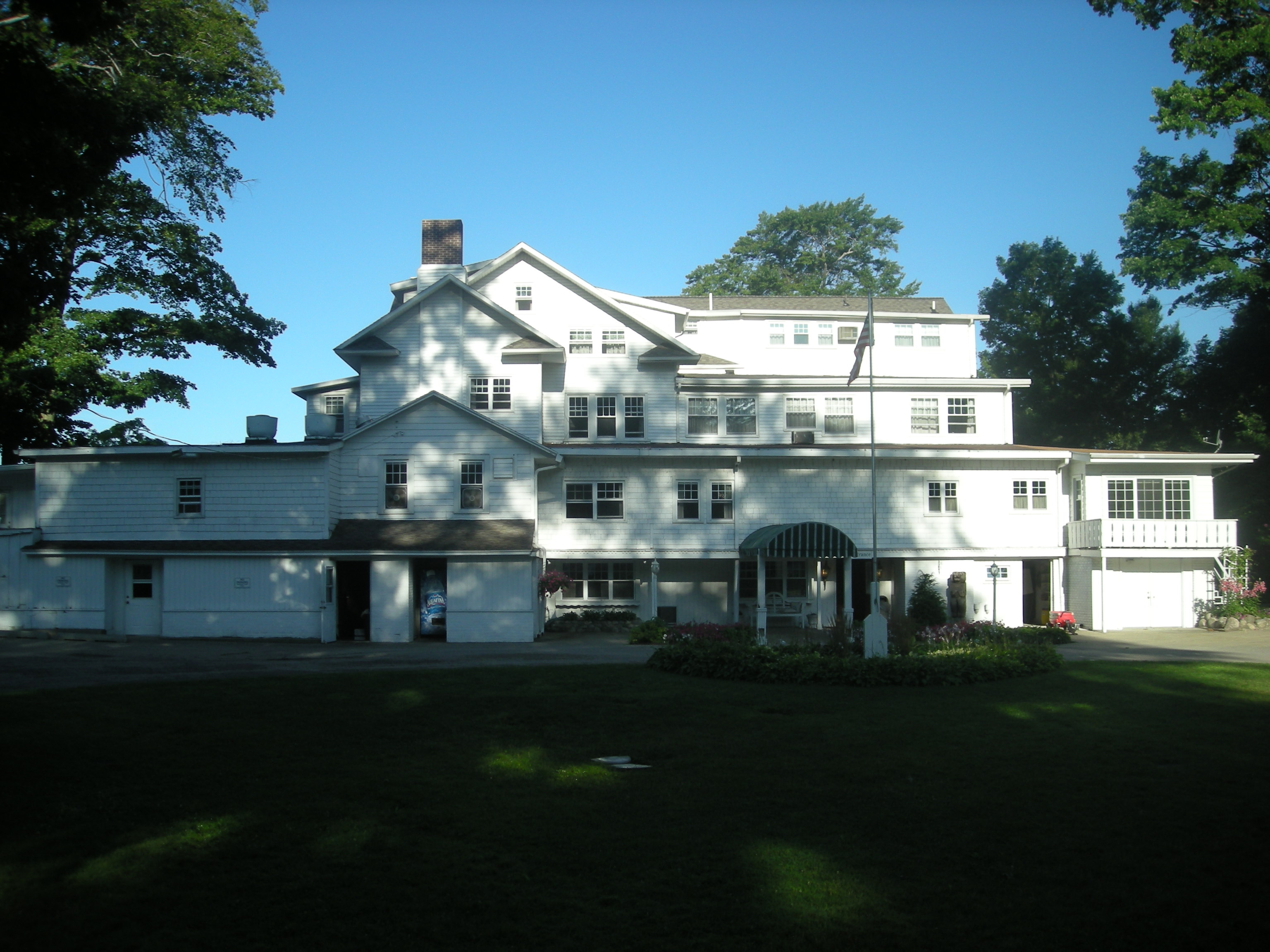
- The exterior of the main lodge in August 2011

- Location within Michigan
- Former names: MICH-ILL-INDA, Michillinda Beach Tavern, Michillinda Beach Lodge
- Etymology: MICHigan, ILLinois, INDianA

General information
- Type: Summer resort
- Location: 5207 Scenic Drive, Whitehall, Michigan, United States
- Coordinates: 43°21′3.69″N 86°24′42.96″W
- Completed: 1904 (main lodge)
- Opened: 1894 (residential beach association); 1920 (resort)
- Destroyed: December 2, 2012 (main lodge)

Technical details
- Floor count: 4
- Floor area: 13,000 square feet (1,200 m^{2})
- Grounds: 22 acres (8.9 ha)

Other information
- Seating type: Dining room
- Seating capacity: 200
- Number of units: 18 (main lodge); 26 (total after the fire)

Website
- michillindalodge.com

Michillinda Lodge (previously MICH-ILL-INDA, the Michillinda Beach Tavern, and Michillinda Beach Lodge) is a summer resort on the Lake Michigan shoreline in Whitehall, Michigan. Its current property was purchased in 1894 by a group of leaseholders and investors from Michigan, Illinois, and Indiana, and named "MICH-ILL-INDA" in reference to those states in 1895. Originally a residential beach association, in 1920 Emanuel "Manny" Duttenhofer purchased an 18-room, 13,000-square-foot (1,200 m^{2}) summer house on the site, which he subsequently opened as a resort.

Between 1920 and 2000, the Lodge was owned and operated by only three families—those of Duttenhofer and his sisters, Ray and Frances Johansen, and Don Eilers—and it developed slowly as both new buildings and activities were gradually debuted. In 2000, the Eilers family sold the Lodge to the investment group Promised Land LLC, which initially proposed the development of a "cottage community" on the site with 36 houses, cottages, and townhouses, although its plan was ultimately rejected by local officials.

On December 2, 2012, the original lodge was completely destroyed in a fire. No one was injured and none of Michillinda's other buildings were severely damaged, although the total losses were estimated in the "millions" of dollars. After being sold to Parkland Properties and developer Jon Rooks in September 2013, Michillinda Lodge reopened to the public in October 2013. As of January 2014, the resort's future directions are still undecided: while plans for rebuilding the lodge on its former footprint have been proposed, the redevelopment of the surviving buildings into either single-family "site condominiums" or weekly vacation rentals are also possibilities.

Since the fire, Michillinda Lodge consists of nine buildings offering 26 guest units in total. The resort positions itself as both family-oriented and historic in nature, and it includes numerous on-site amenities, ranging from an outdoor swimming pool and a miniature golf course to a campfire and a 400-foot (120 m) private beach on Lake Michigan. Additionally, Michillinda Lodge accommodates weddings and receptions, as well as reunions and other gatherings. Before the restaurant in the main lodge was destroyed in the fire, it provided dining for both resort guests and the general public.

== History ==
=== Early history (1894–1951) ===
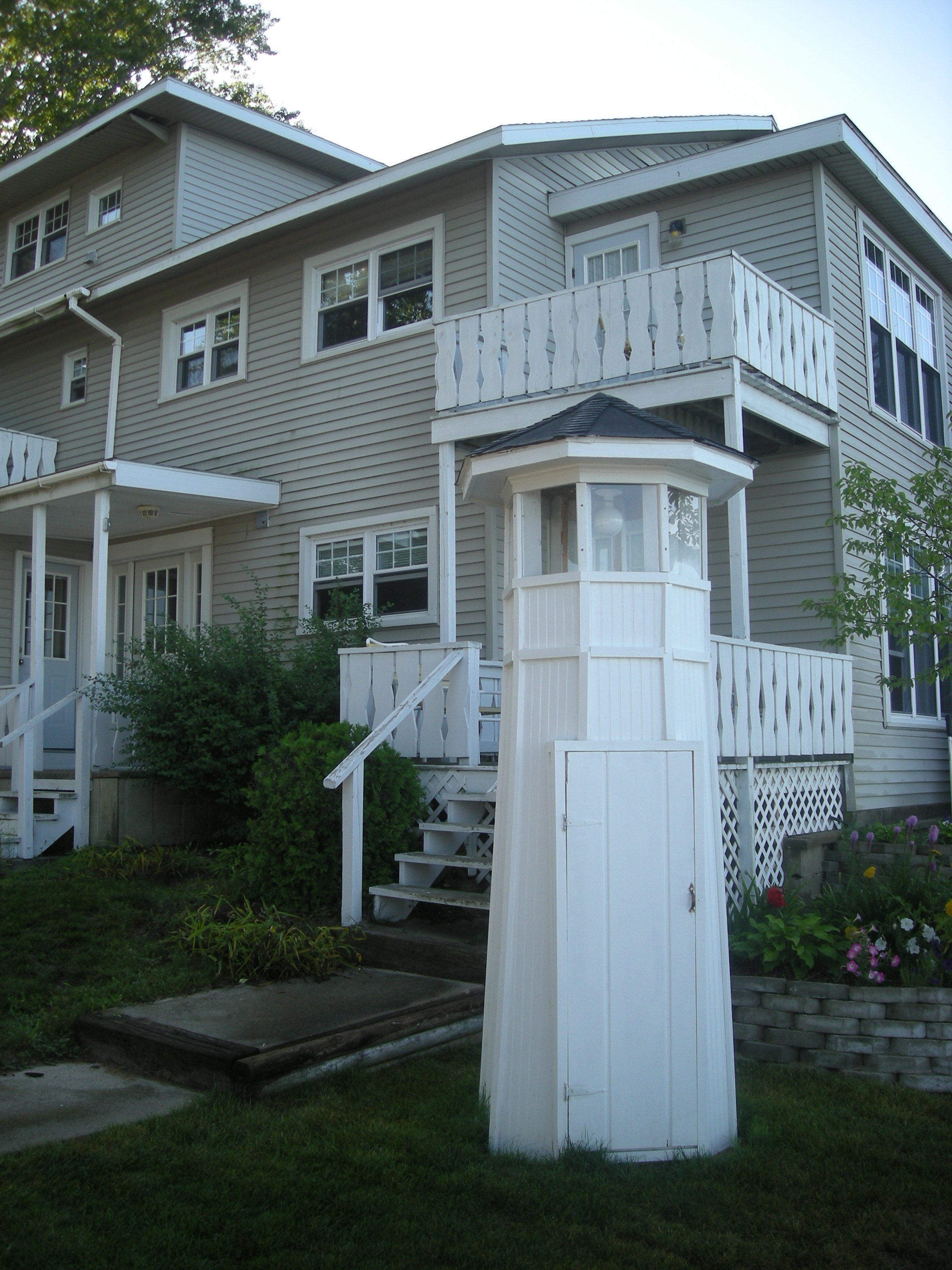
The Annex, built during the Duttenhofer ownership of Michillinda Lodge

The history of Michillinda Lodge began in 1894, when Theo Willson, a Moline, Illinois native and former Congregational pastor in Muskegon, Michigan, vacationed in a cottage at Sylvan Beach, Michigan, with three of his deacons. Sylvan Beach was a cottage community that had been established in 1883. The four men were so impressed by the experience that they decided to purchase 22 acres (8.9 ha) of land along the Lake Michigan shore that would ultimately become the grounds of the future resort. Together with one investor from Grand Rapids, Michigan, and another from Indiana, they bought the property from John R. Austin for $1,000. An alternate account in a contemporary 1895 issue of the Pharos-Tribune states the new private resort covered 40 acres (16 ha) and was platted by three men, respectively hailing from Moline; Elkhart, Michigan; and South Bend, Indiana.

Willson and his group decided to split the property into 23 lots and create a residential beach association, requiring that all leaseholders build on their land within two years or else relinquish their leases. Combined with the stipulation that all buildings constructed had to be worth at least $600, the result was the creation of a number of comfortable and fairly simple two-story cottages. In 1895, the property's leaseholders decided to name it "MICH-ILL-INDA", in reference to the three states from which they hailed: Michigan, Illinois, and Indiana.

Constructed in either 1904 or 1909, what would eventually become the main lodge was built as the vacation home of C. R. Stephens of Moline; it was erected using balloon construction, along with a wooden truss roof and asphalt shingles. The four-story building, which the Stephens family christened "Lover's Lane," measured 13,000 square feet (1,200 m^{2}) and, in its final configuration, featured 18 guest rooms as well as a kitchen and a pair of dining rooms with a capacity of 200. In 1920, Whitehall resident Emanuel "Manny" Duttenhofer purchased this building, which was one of the two largest summer homes at Michillinda. Initially, he intended to make it a summer retreat for his family, but after the unexpected death of his wife he instead used it to host friends and relatives. Shortly thereafter, he opened the building as a public resort and christened it the Michillinda Beach Tavern. In 1933, the resort was renamed Michillinda Beach Lodge to differentiate itself from alcohol-serving saloons, many of which renamed themselves "taverns" after the repeal of the Eighteenth Amendment to the United States Constitution. During their ownership, Duttenhofer and his sisters helped to develop Michillinda into one of the area's most frequented resorts, and the increased demand necessitated the construction of a two-story, 10-room Annex.

=== Johansen and Eilers ownership (1951–2000) ===
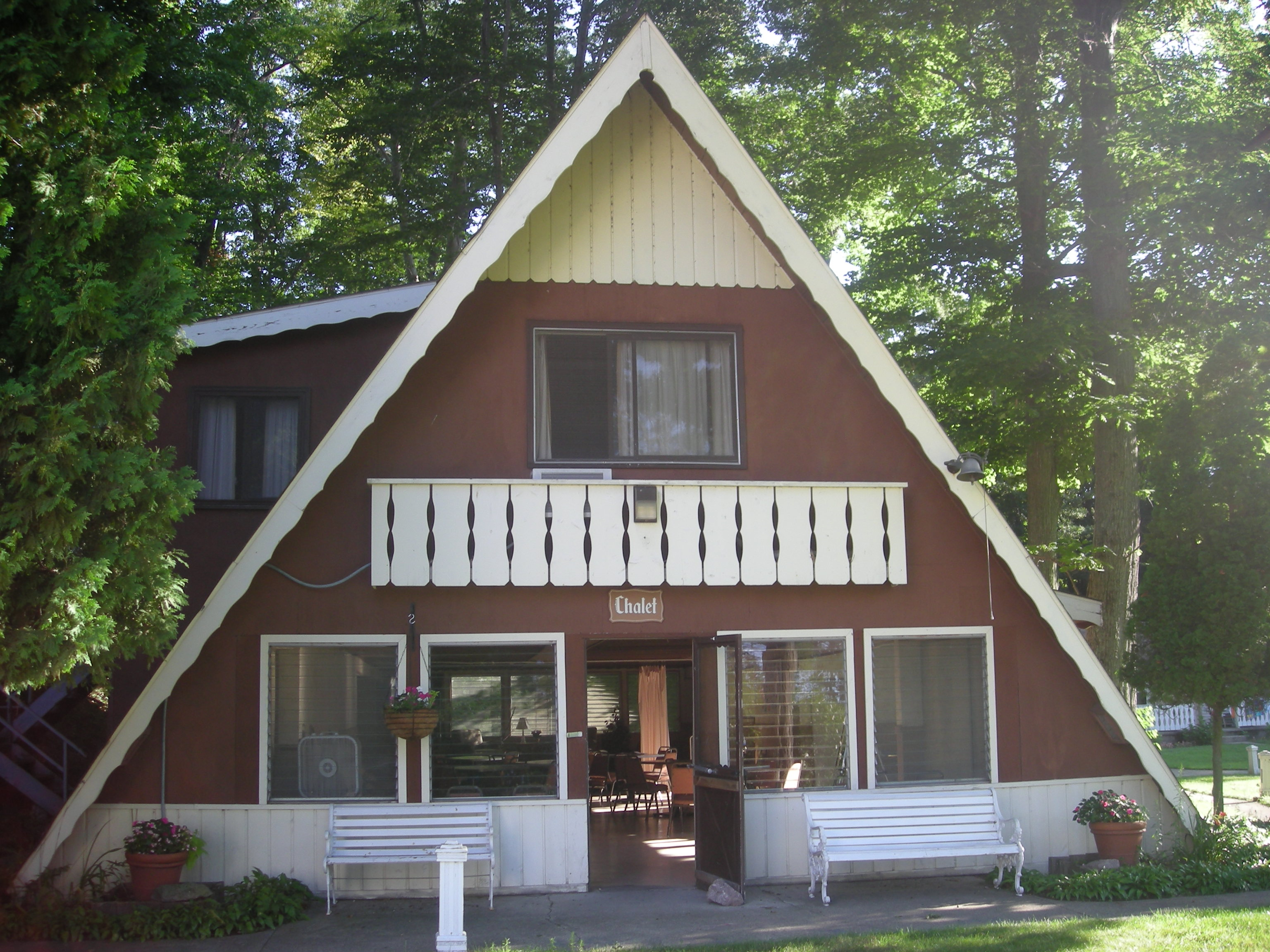
The Chalet, built in 1965 during the Johansen ownership of Michillinda Lodge

In 1951, after Manny Duttenhofer's death, Ray and Frances Johansen of Twin Lake's South Shore Resort bought Michillinda and put an emphasis on modernization and innovation at the resort. One of their most notable new creations was the "Evening Coffee Hour", which began a long-standing tradition of serving coffee and cookies at sunset. As Michillinda's reputation grew, it attracted the interest of local celebrities, including Nancy Fleming, who enjoyed a private retreat at the Lodge after being crowned Miss America in 1960. In 1965, the Johansens built a Chalet on the grounds to host evening programs, including a variety show on Friday nights; the same year, their daughter Judith married Don Eilers.

In 1972, the couple moved into the Lodge with plans to ultimately buy and operate it themselves; in 1973, after Judith's sudden illness and unexpected death, Don Eilers decided to acquire and manage Michillinda himself. Eilers, eventually with his second wife Sue, ran Michillinda Beach Lodge for the next 28 years, during which a number of new activities were introduced, including bingo on Sunday nights and a Western-style campfire. In 2000, the couple retired and sold the property for $1.65 million to Grand Rapids-based investment group Promised Land LLC, which was named in reference to Wilson's description of the site as the "promised land" to his congregation.

=== 21st century ===
In 2000, shortly after purchasing Michillinda, Promised Land LLC revealed new plans for the Lodge that involved the creation of a "cottage community" consisting of a total of 36 houses, cottages, and townhouses. However, the proposal was rejected by Fruitland Township planners, and in 2001 Promised Land decided to continue to operate Michillinda Lodge as it existed. Also that year, Promised Land invested $1 million into renovating the main lodge, as well as upgrading Michillinda's lakeside buildings to make them usable during the off-season. In the summer of 2012, Promised Land hired Hotel Investment Services, of Troy, Michigan, to manage the Lodge.

==== 2012 fire ====
On December 2, 2012, the original lodge was entirely destroyed by a fire while it was under renovation. At the time of the fire, there were five workers staying in the building, all of whom escaped safely. After a delay of 15 minutes during which the lodge's occupants attempted to suppress the fire themselves, the fire was reported at 4:27 am as it quickly spread through the building. The first fire truck arrived on the scene at 4:37 am; in total, 40 vehicles were involved in battling the blaze, including two aerial trucks and 15 tanker trucks, until fire loss was reported as stopped at 7:30 am. With no fire hydrants in the area, firefighters had to use the surrounding lakes as sources of water instead. Furthermore, winds blowing in from Lake Michigan at 35 mph (56 km/h) fueled the flames and further increased the difficulty of the firefighting operation. In all, 77 firefighters and equipment from 15 different fire departments participated in the response. While they were not able to prevent the destruction of the 110-year-old main lodge, they were able to successfully protect the other buildings in the immediate vicinity.

Gregory Holman, the fire chief of the White Lake Fire Authority, noted that the firefighting effort would have been much more difficult had the fire occurred during the summer, when the lodge would have been at or near capacity. According to Holman, the cause of the fire was still "undetermined of an unknown origin" in May 2013. Ron Wilson, the CEO of Hotel Investment Services, stated that his "best guess" was that the fire was caused by an electric short in the building's heaters, although fire investigators could neither confirm nor deny an electrical cause to the fire. Business adviser John Harrington, who spoke on behalf of Michillinda's owners, estimated the damages as in the "millions" of dollars, including more than $1 million in recent renovations as well as lodging and wedding reservations already made for the 2013 season. The disaster took an additional emotional toll on the Lodge's owners, employees, and returning guests, some of whom were members of families who had vacationed at Michillinda for multiple generations. In the aftermath of the fire, Muskegon County police also reported that copper heat registers worth an estimated $2,000 were stolen from the burnt main lodge.

==== Post-fire recovery ====
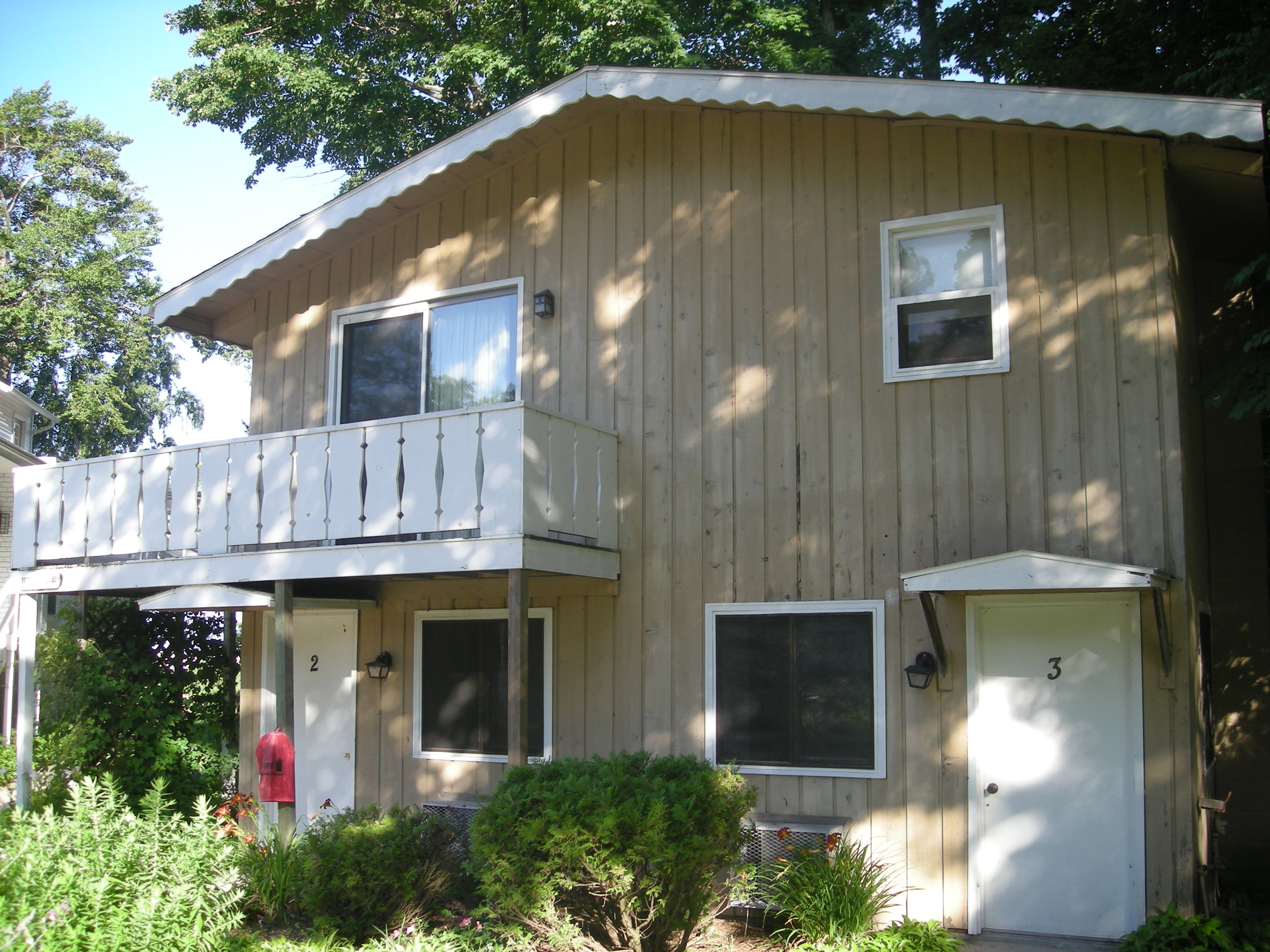
Hillside, one of the Michillinda cottages that survived the fire

While Hotel Investment Services and Promised Land LLC originally hoped to reopen Michillinda Lodge to the public during the summer of 2013, on September 6, 2013, they sold it to a local real estate firm, Parkland Properties, and developer Jon Rooks. While a final purchase price was not disclosed, the entire property and related assets, including the lodge fire insurance settlement, was listed at $2.6 million. After ultimately losing the entire summer 2013 season, the Lodge was reopened for business in October 2013 with a North Muskegon High School reunion followed by a private party. Upon reopening, the resort included a total of 11 cottages, the largest of which could accommodate guests in 14 rooms.

In August 2013, Rooks voiced his desire to keep Michillinda "as it is now as much as possible and preserve the history". Taking into account both township land-use ordinances and Michigan Department of Environmental Quality regulations, he outlined three possible future directions for Michillinda: rebuilding the lodge, converting all of the surviving buildings into single-family "site condominiums", or refurbishing those buildings as weekly vacation rentals instead. As the only lodge and restaurant on the Lake Michigan shoreline in all of Muskegon County before it burned down, Michillinda received strong support for rebuilding the lodge from the local tourism community, which included the White Lake Area Chamber of Commerce and the Muskegon County Convention & Visitors Bureau.

By January 2014, Rooks had decided to present plans for rebuilding the lodge on its former footprint to Fruitland Township officials. He stated that there would be "no intensive development plan and the lodge will be as similar to the old one as possible". However, the rebuilding proposal was still only in the planning stages, and Michillinda Lodge's future redevelopment plans remained undetermined.

== Accommodations and amenities ==
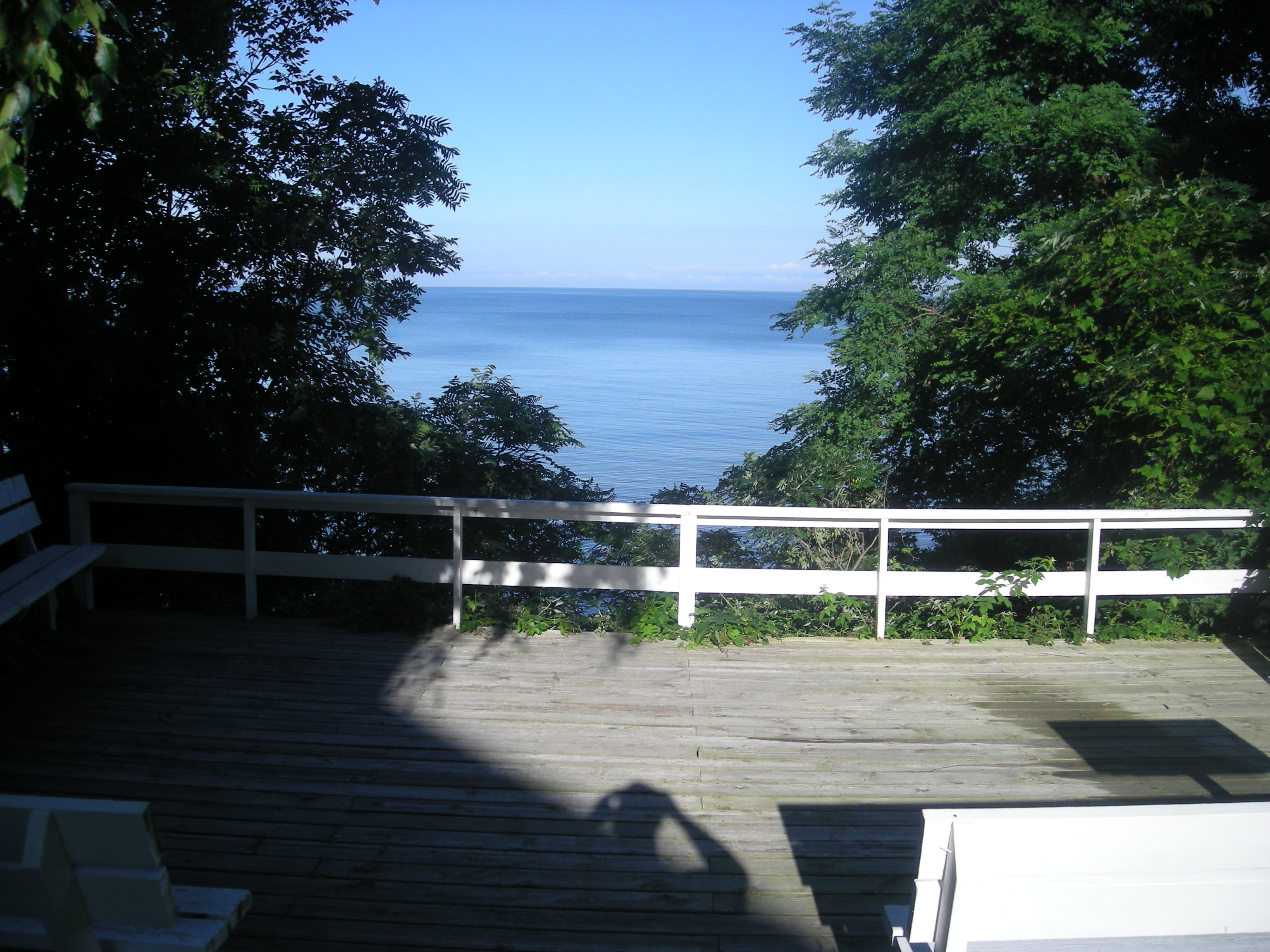
The deck overlooking Lake Michigan that is used for wedding ceremonies

As of 2015, Michillinda Lodge consists of nine buildings providing 26 guest units in total. The resort positions itself as both family-oriented and historic in nature, and does not provide either telephones or televisions in its guest rooms. On-site amenities include a heated outdoor swimming pool, two shuffleboard courts, a miniature golf course, basketball and volleyball courts, and two tennis courts. Also on the grounds are a playground, a campfire, and a 400-foot (120 m) private beach on Lake Michigan. The destruction of the main lodge in 2012 did not damage any of these amenities.

Michillinda Lodge also accommodates weddings and receptions, the former on a deck overlooking Lake Michigan and the latter in a wedding tent on its lawn. By 2012, the Lodge was hosting roughly 35 weddings annually. Additionally, the Lodge hosts other types of gatherings, such as reunions, meetings, and parties. Before the destruction of the main lodge, meals were served in its dining rooms, and public dining that attracted a number of local patrons was also offered. However, after the Lodge's restaurant was lost in the fire, it simply recommends local restaurants to its guests.

=== Gallery ===
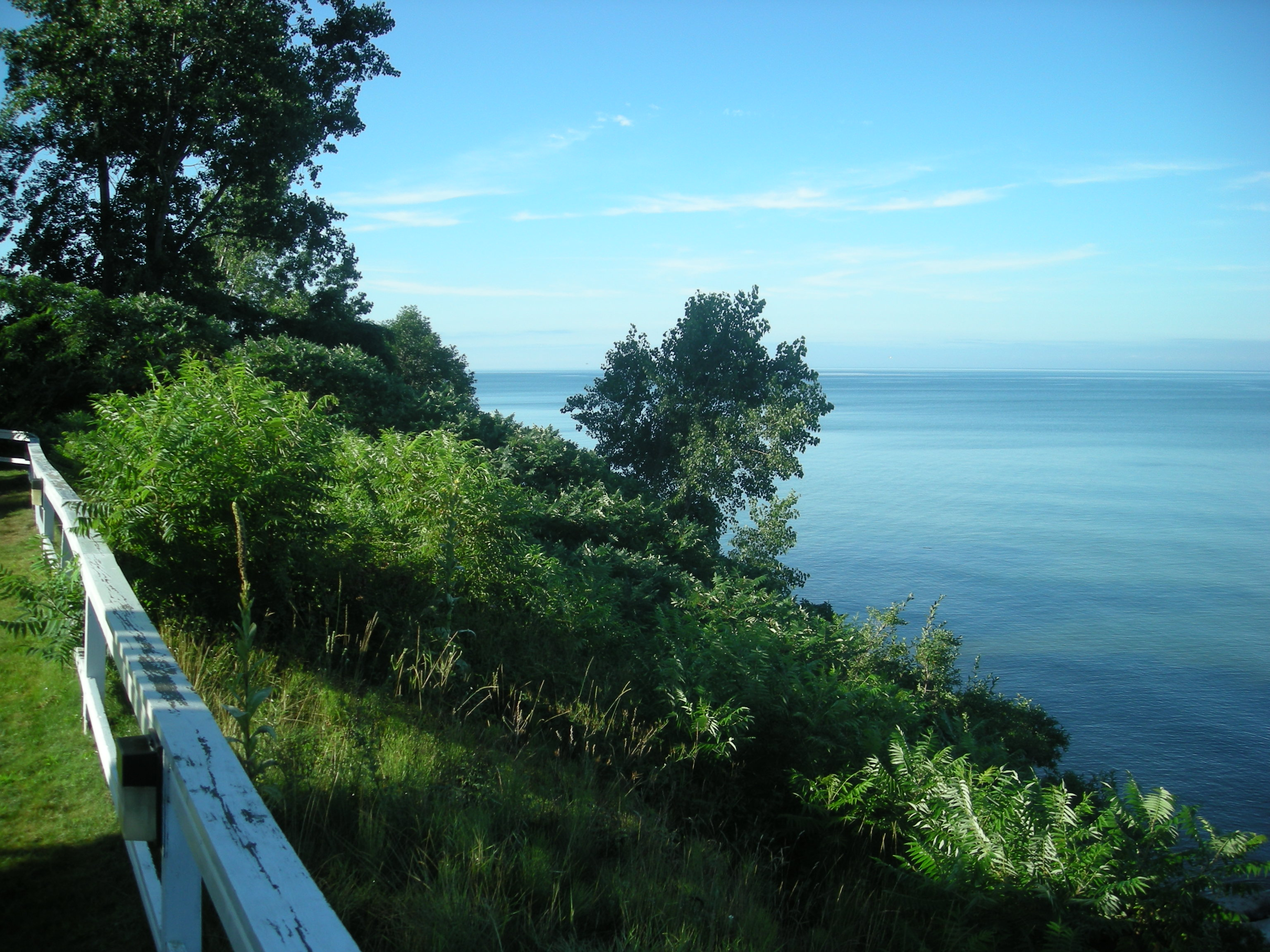
View of Lake Michigan

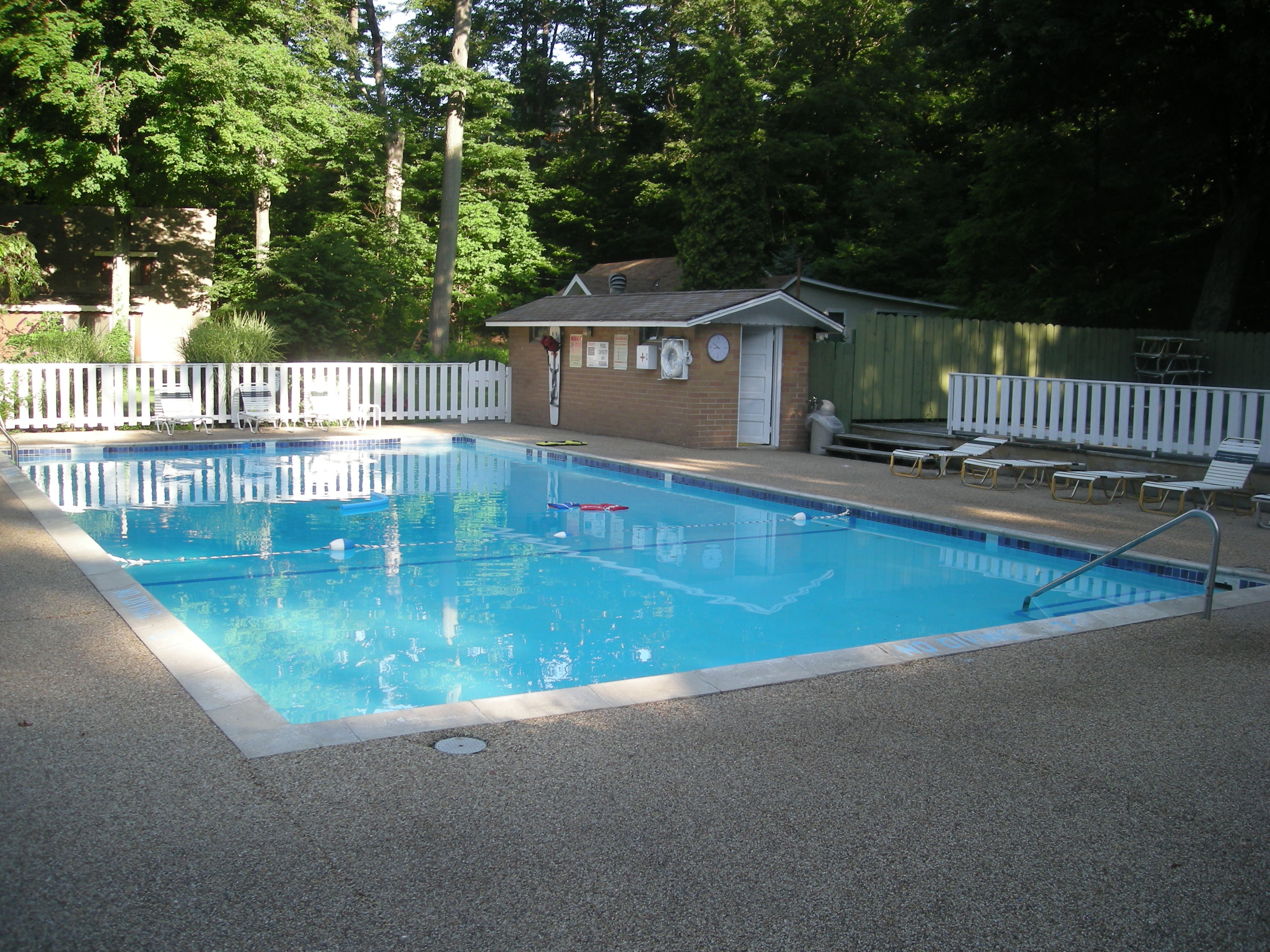
Swimming pool

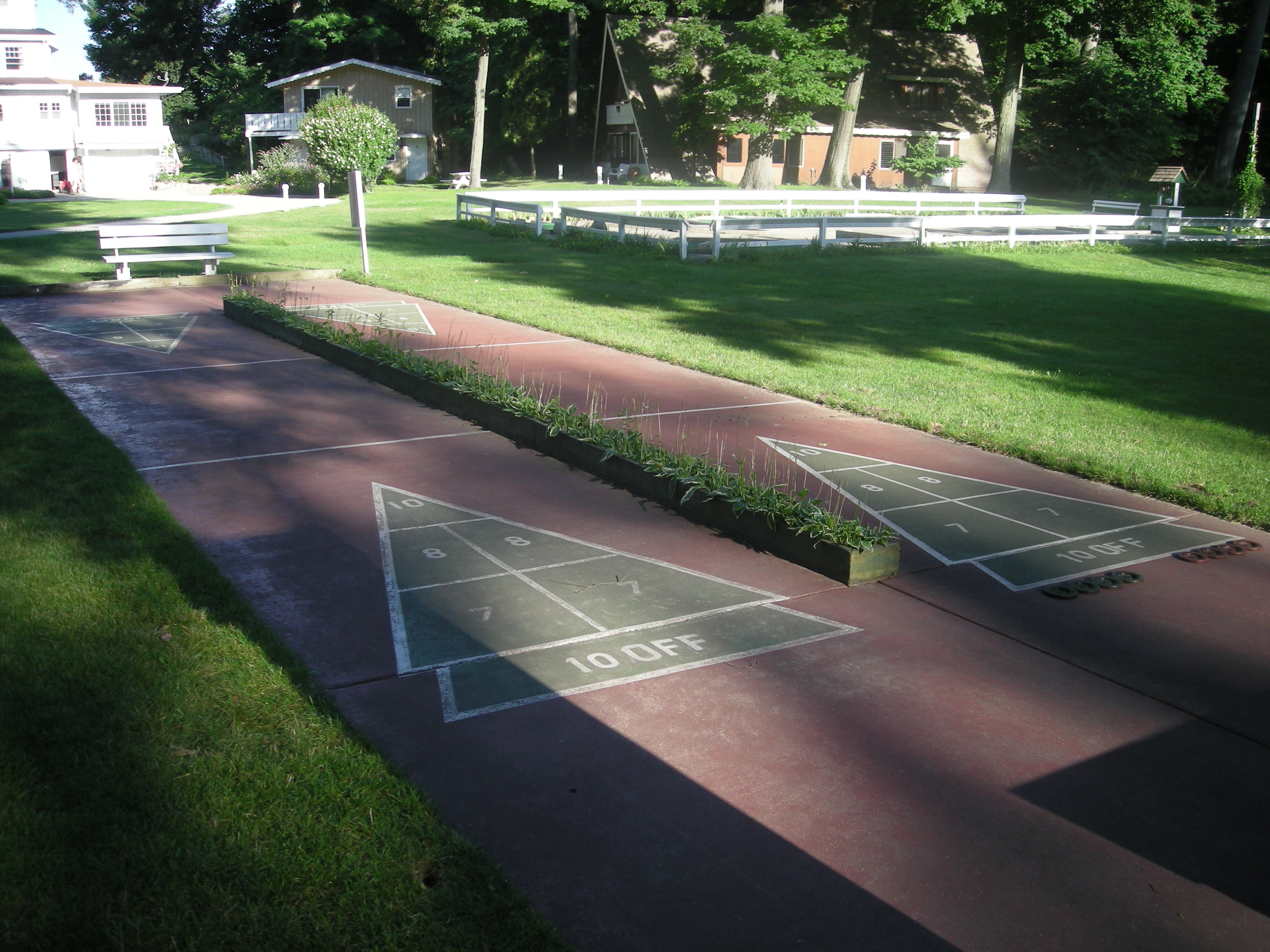
Shuffleboard courts

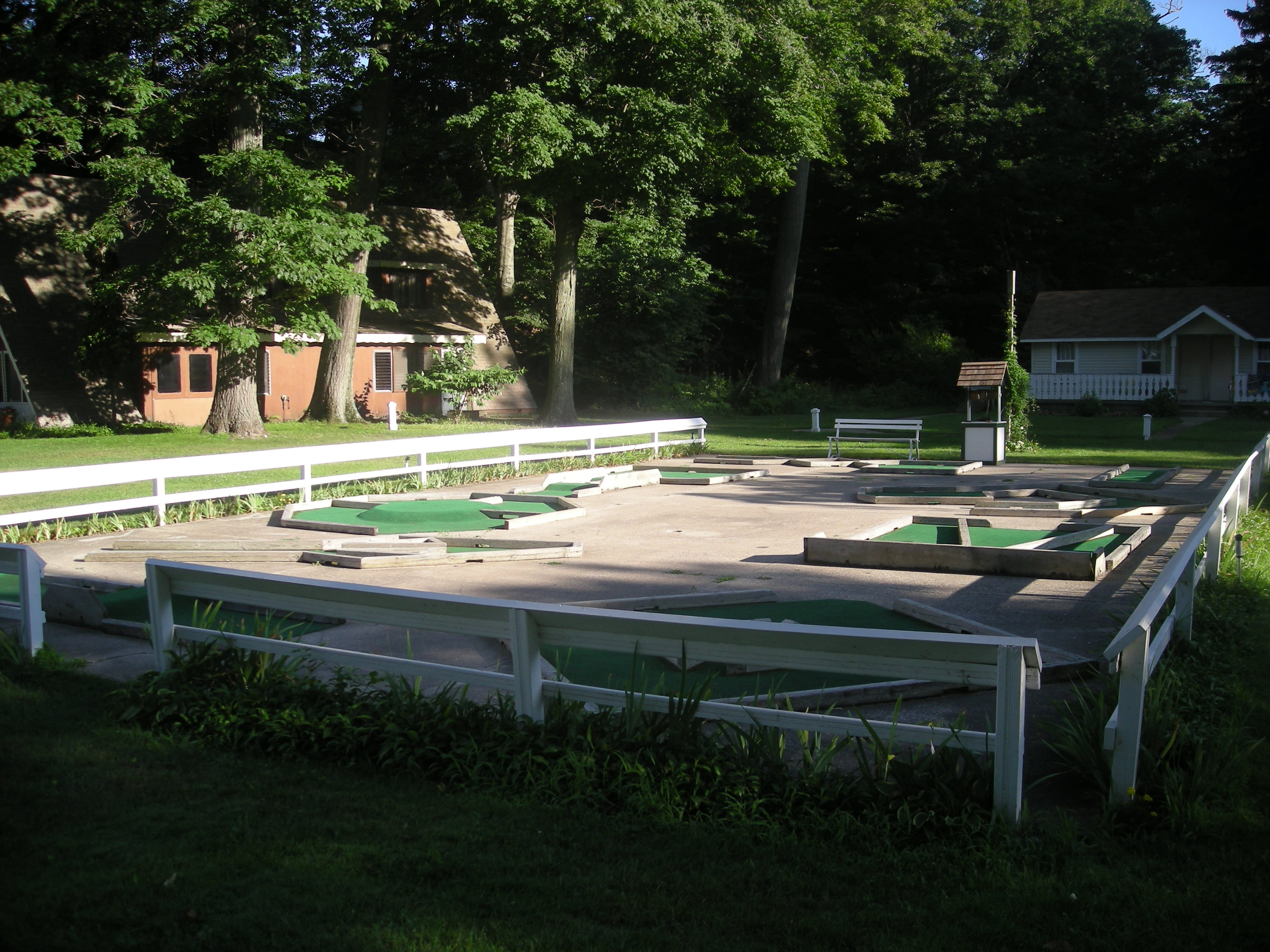
Miniature golf course

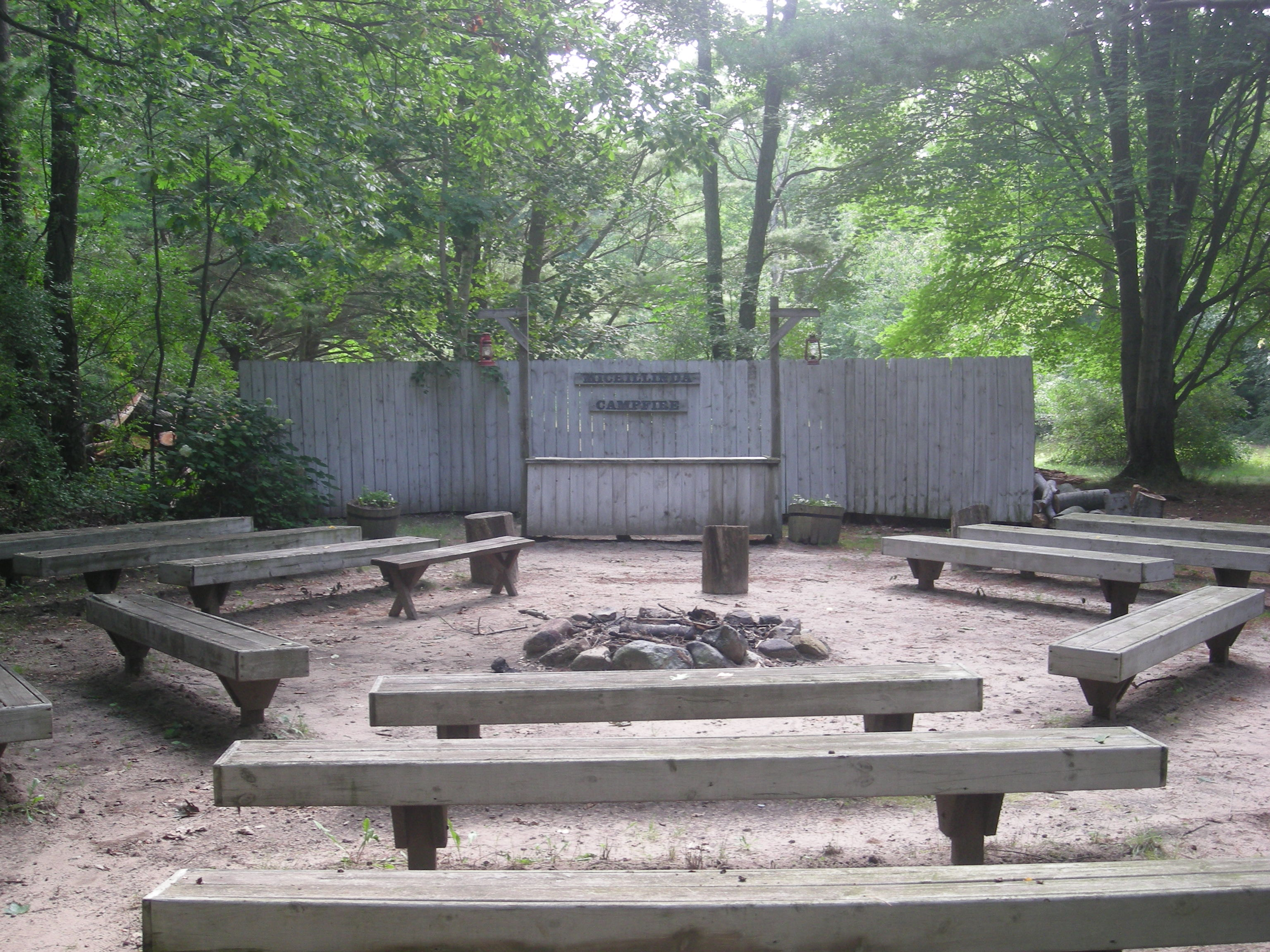
Campfire
