= Cal-Ida, California =

Unincorporated community in California, United States

- Unincorporated community
- Location within California Location within the United States
- Coordinates: 39°31′34″N 121°00′57″W
- Country: United States
- State: California
- County: Sierra
- Elevation: 3,537 ft (1,078 m)
- Time zone: UTC-8 (Pacific (PST))
  - Summer (DST): UTC-7 (PDT)
- Area code: 530
- GNIS feature ID: 1658189

Cal-Ida is an unincorporated community in Sierra County, California, United States. Cal-Ida is 7 miles (11 km) west of Goodyears Bar. A former sawmill camp, Cal-Ida was down to four residents by 1971; a few buildings remain at the site today.
