= Lisabeula, Washington =

Unincorporated community in Washington, US

- Unincorporated community
- Location in Washington and the United States Lisabeula (the United States)
- Country: United States
- State: Washington
- County: King
- Elevation: 171 ft (52 m)
- Time zone: UTC-8 (Pacific (PST))
  - Summer (DST): UTC-7 (PDT)
- Area code: 360
- GNIS feature ID: 1511100

Lisabeula is an unincorporated community in King County, Washington, United States.

== History ==
A post office called Lisabeula was established in 1892, and remained in operation until 1935. The community's name is an amalgamation of Elisa and Beulah.
