= Ucolo, Utah =

Unincorporated community in the state of Utah, United States

Ucolo
- Unincorporated community
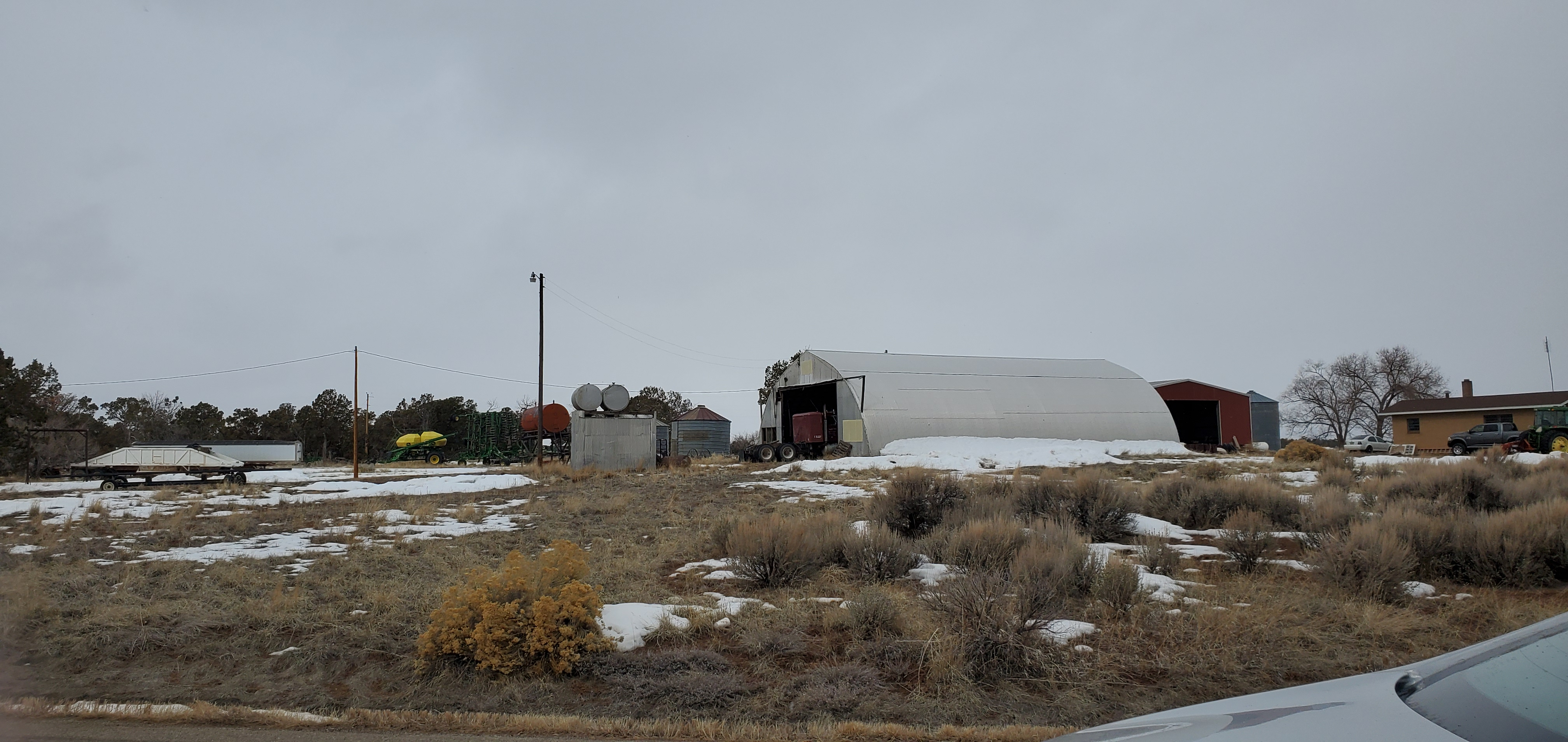

- Location within the state of Utah
- Coordinates: 37°51′39″N 109°03′53″W
- Country: United States
- State: Utah
- County: San Juan
- Named after: Portmanteau of Utah and Colorado
- Elevation: 6,762 ft (2,061 m)
- Time zone: UTC-7 (Mountain (MST))
  - Summer (DST): UTC-6 (MDT)
- ZIP code: 84512
- Area code: 435
- GNIS feature ID: 1455156

Ucolo is an unincorporated community in San Juan County, Utah, United States.

== Description ==
Historical population
Census	Pop.	Note	%±
1940	224		—
1950	379		69.2%
Source: U.S. Census Bureau

The settlement is located close to the Colorado border, and its name is a portmanteau of Utah and Colorado. The nearest major highway is U.S. Route 491, and the nearest established settlement is Egnar, Colorado.
