= Calneva, California =

Unincorporated community in California, United States

Calneva
- Unincorporated community
- Location in California Calneva (the United States)
- Coordinates: 40°09′10″N 120°00′32″W
- Country: United States
- State: California
- County: Lassen
- Elevation: 4,009 ft (1,222 m)

Calneva (/kælˈniː.və/) is an unincorporated community in Lassen County, California, United States. It is located 10 miles (16 km) north-northeast of Doyle, at an elevation of 4009 feet (1222 m). Calneva is on the Nevada state line—its name is a portmanteau of California and Nevada.

The town was developed in the hope of finding sufficient water to sustain it. However this proved problematic with the water proving too saline for drinking. This, combined with the farm prices crash of the 1920s, failure of mining ventures and the cancellation of an additional rail line led to the town declining until it was no longer viable to operate either a post office or a station there.

During the 1916 New York City polio epidemic a quarantine officer was stationed there to medically examine passengers from New York, New Jersey and Chicago in an attempt to prevent the disease spreading to California.

A post office operated at Calneva from 1911 to 1919, and from 1920 to 1933.
