= Davella, Kentucky =

Unincorporated community in Kentucky, United States

- Unincorporated community
- Location within Kentucky Location within the United States
- Coordinates: 37°47′53″N 82°34′55″W
- Country: United States
- State: Kentucky
- County: Martin
- Elevation: 692 ft (211 m)
- Time zone: UTC-5 (Eastern (EST))
  - Summer (DST): UTC-4 (EDT)
- ZIP codes: 41212
- GNIS feature ID: 507815

Davella is an unincorporated community located in Martin County, Kentucky, United States.

A post office was established in 1902 with Dave Delong as the postmaster. The town was named after Delong and his wife Ella.
