= Franklin County Jail (Benton, Illinois) =

- U.S. National Register of Historic Places
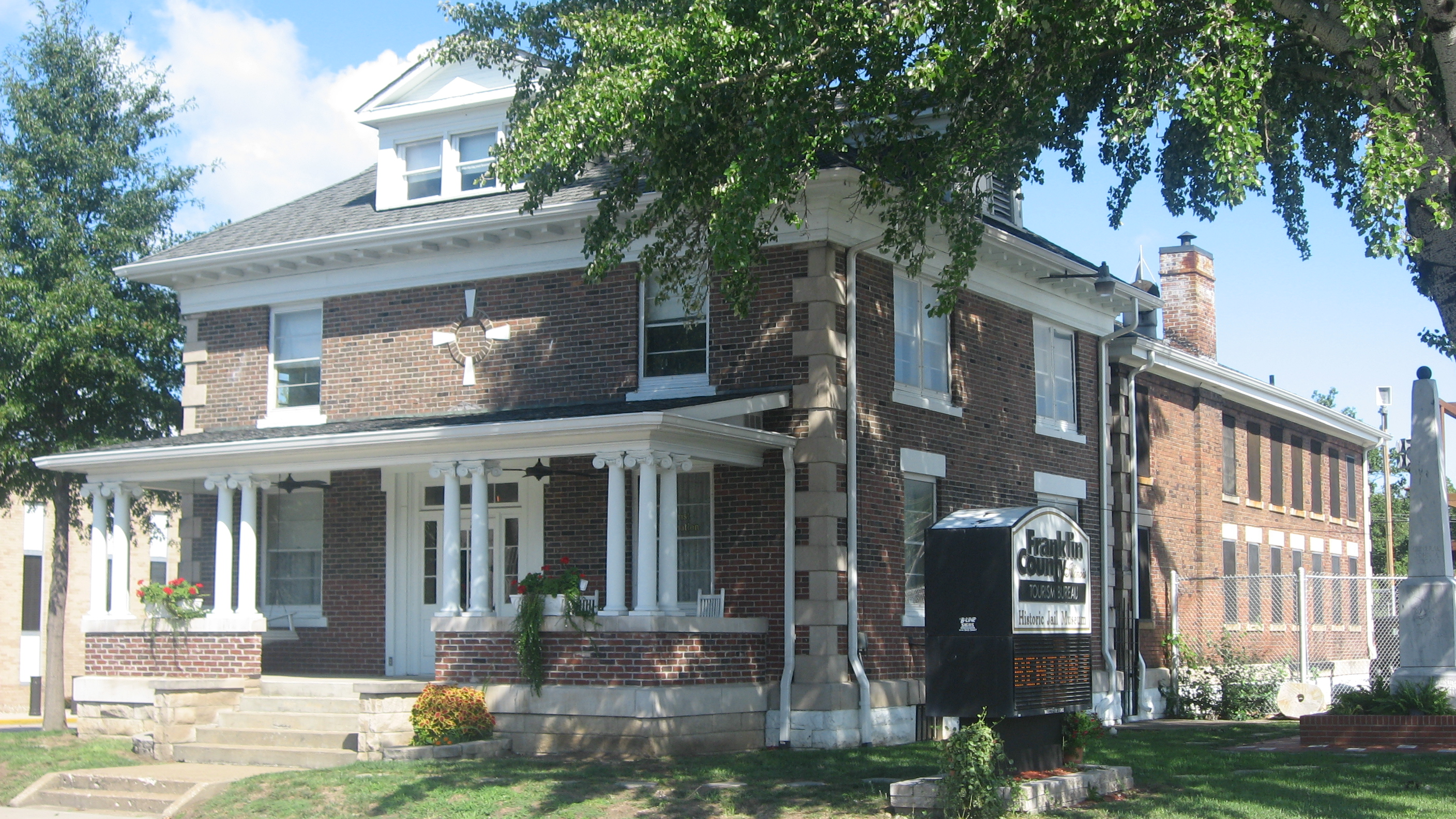
- Front and side of the old jail

- Location within Illinois Location within the United States
- Location: 209 W. Main St., Benton, Illinois
- Coordinates: 38°0′15″N 88°54′58″W
- Area: Less than 1 acre (0.40 ha)
- Architects: J.R. Royer, R.Z. Gill
- Architectural style: Classical Revival
- NRHP reference No.: 99000111
- Added to NRHP: February 5, 1999

The Franklin County Jail, located at 209 W. Main St. in Benton, is the former county jail of Franklin County, Illinois. The jail was built in 1905–06 to replace the county's previous jail, which was built in the 1840s after the county seat moved to Benton. Architect Joseph W. Royer designed the jail; the brick building features limestone trim, a hip roof with gabled dormers, and a front porch which was rebuilt in 1997. The building also included the county sheriff's residence, an arrangement which allowed for the sheriff to continuously watch the prisoners. The jail housed prisoners until 1990, when a new jail was constructed after the State of Illinois condemned the old building. The Franklin County Historic Preservation Society has since converted the old jail to a historic museum.

The jail building was added to the National Register of Historic Places in 1999. It is one of three listed properties in Franklin County. The other two are the Sesser Opera House, in Sesser and the West Frankfort City Hall, in West Frankfort.

== See also ==
- Franklin County Courthouse
