= Sesser Opera House =

- U.S. National Register of Historic Places
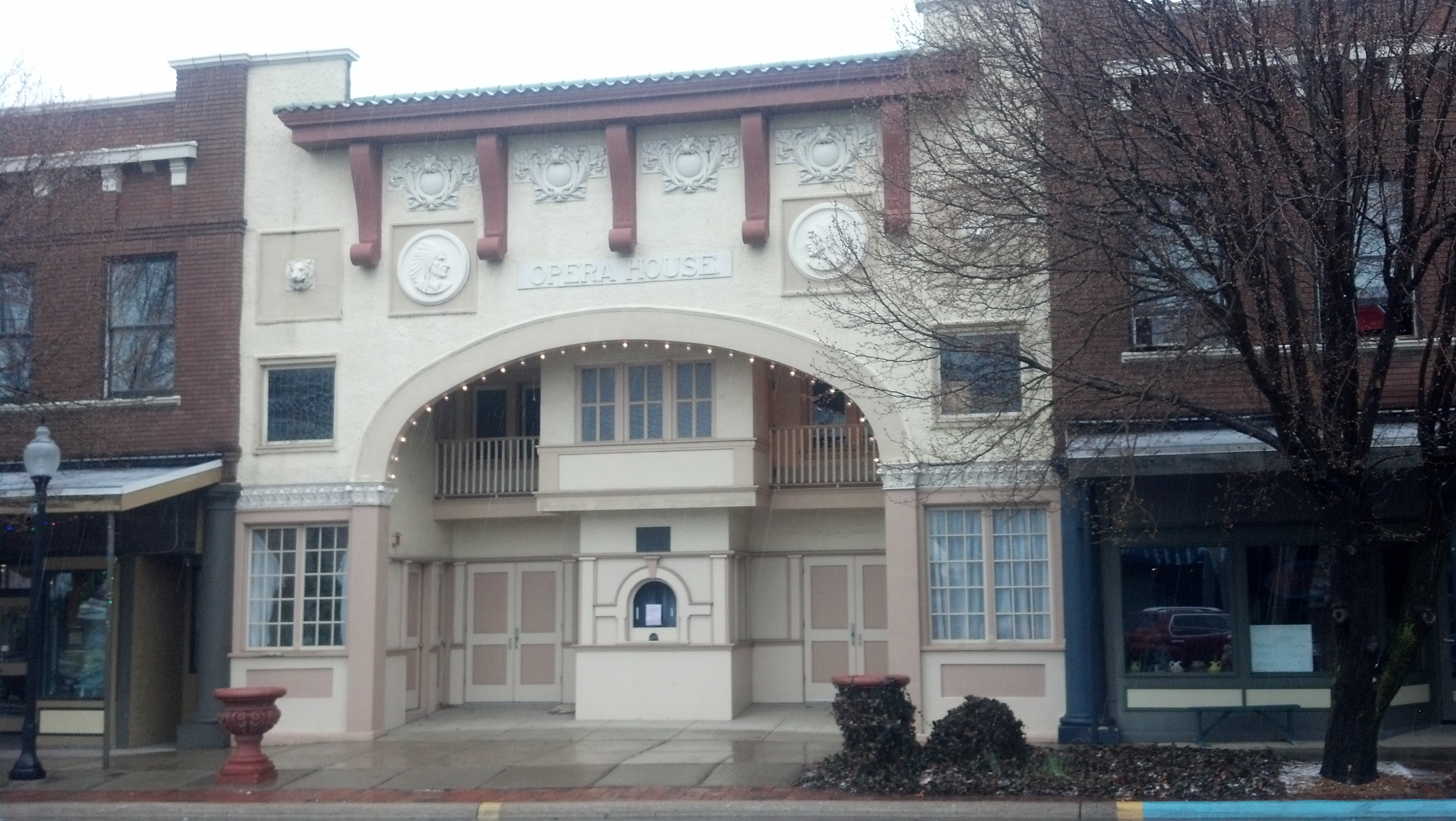

- Location within Illinois Location within the United States
- Location: 106 W. Franklin Ave., Sesser, Illinois
- Coordinates: 38°5′29″N 89°3′2″W
- Area: less than one acre
- Built: 1914
- Built by: James H. Hill; Sam Criswell; Canada Jones
- Architectural style: Mission Revival
- NRHP reference No.: 82002535
- Added to NRHP: March 12, 1982

The Sesser Opera House is a historic theater located at 106 W. Franklin Ave. in Sesser, Illinois. The theater was built in 1914 to replace a previous theater, which had been built in 1904 and burned down ten years later. The theater was designed in the Mission Revival style and features a stucco interior, a large arch around the entrance designed to resemble an arcade, and a projecting eave topped with Spanish tiles. The theater was used for plays and vaudeville entertainment, traveling musicians, and showing films; its predecessor was the first theater in Sesser to be built with a projection room. The building also hosted local meetings and events as well as entertainment performed by community members.

The building was listed on the National Register of Historic Places in 1982. The Sesser Opera House is one of three Franklin County sites listed on the National Register. The other two are the West Frankfort City Hall in West Frankfort and the Franklin County Jail in the county seat of Benton.
