= West Frankfort City Hall =

- U.S. National Register of Historic Places
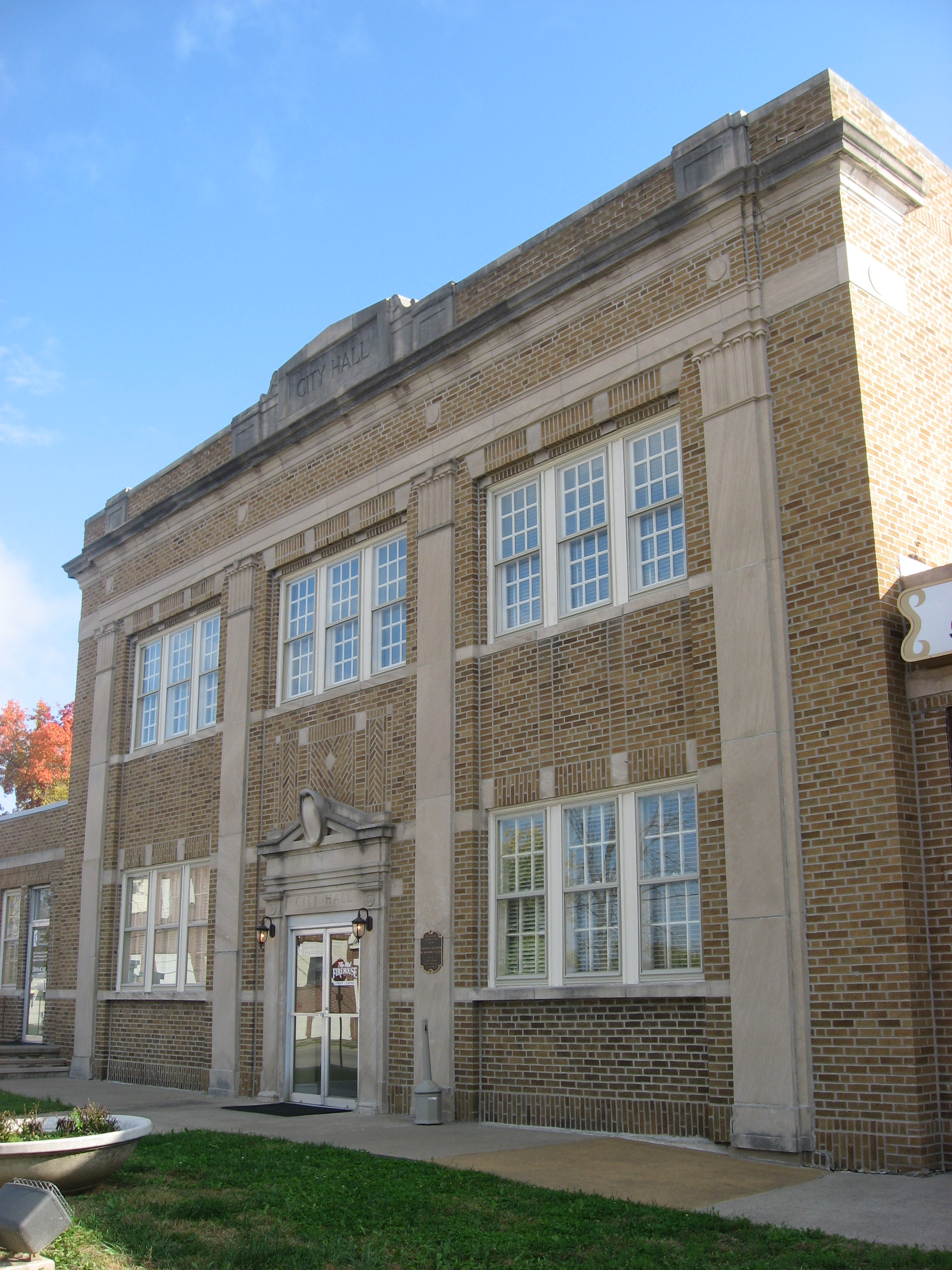
- Main facade of the building

- Location within Illinois Location within the United States
- Location: 108 N. Emma St., West Frankfort, Illinois
- Coordinates: 37°53′55″N 88°55′24″W
- Area: less than one acre
- Built: S. M. Wilson
- NRHP reference No.: 02000460
- Added to NRHP: May 9, 2002

West Frankfort City Hall, located at 108 N. Emma St., is the former city hall of West Frankfort, Illinois. The city hall was built in 1921 to serve the city, which had no city hall up until that time. West Frankfort was first settled in 1895, when the Frankfort railway station was built 1.5 miles (2.4 km) west of Frankfort; the original city of Frankfort merged into West Frankfort in 1923. The city hall is a two-story brick building which was built by contractor S. M. Wilson at a cost of $35,000. It was used as the city hall through 1979, when a new City Hall was constructed; the building is now used for meetings of the West Frankfort Civic Center Authority.

The building was listed on the National Register of Historic Places on May 9, 2002. The City Hall is one of three properties in Franklin County listed on the National Register. The other two are the Sesser Opera House, in the city of Sesser, and the Franklin County Jail in the city of Benton.
