= Franklin County Courthouse (Illinois) =

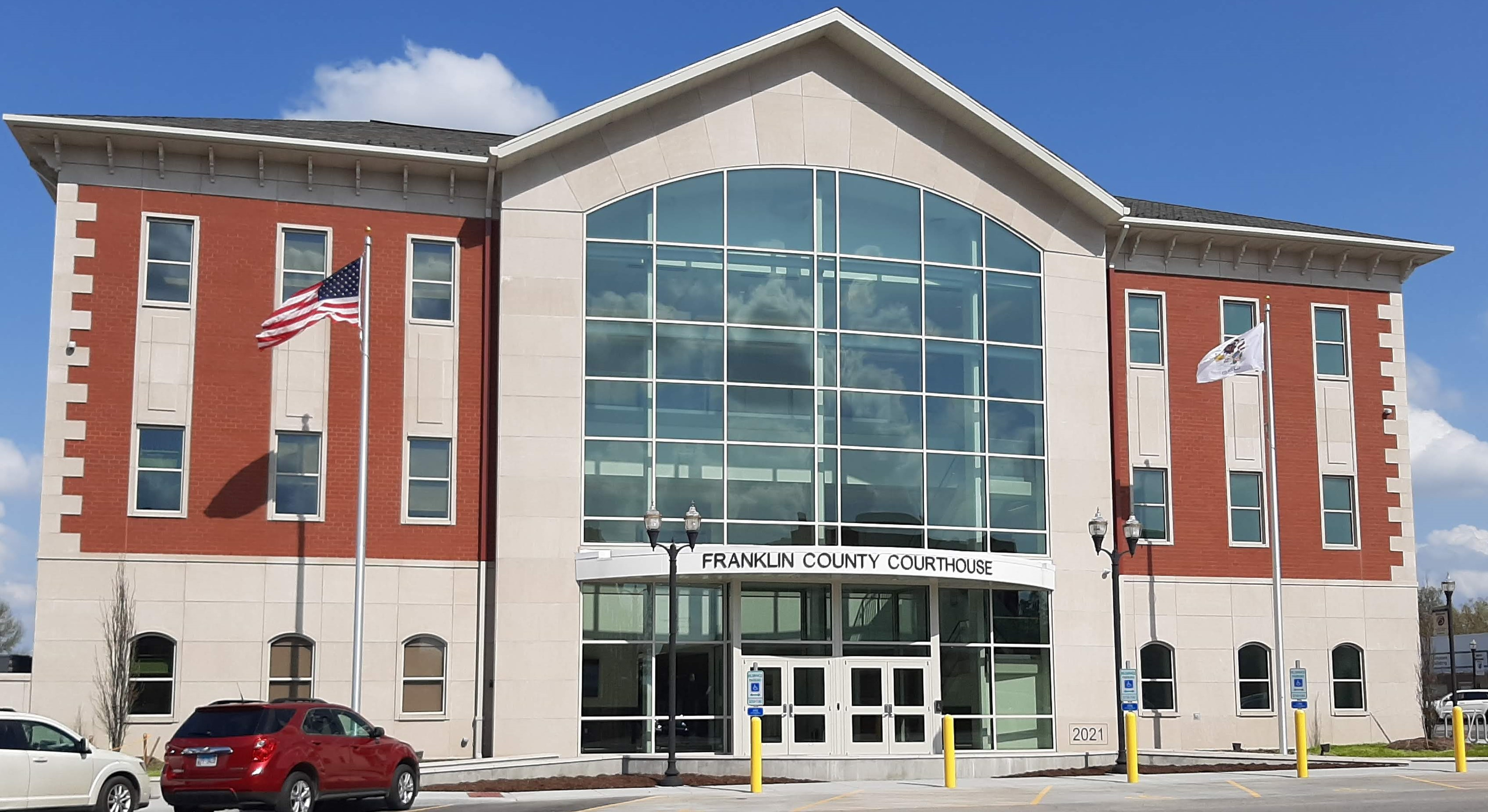
- The courthouse on its opening day

General information
- Construction started: August 5, 2020 (including demolition)

The Franklin County Courthouse is a government building located in Benton, Illinois. It took 620 days to complete from start to finish, costing around $13 million for the courthouse itself. A nearby government building also saw renovations so it could house the courtrooms and the Circuit Clerk's office while the courthouse was under construction. That brought the total cost to around $18 million.

The courthouse was finished ahead of schedule and was reported to have been cheaper than fixing the previous courthouse.

== Early history ==
Franklin County was settled slowly. Few squatters occupied public lands before the land office at Shawneetown opened in 1814, and as late as 1850, half of the public land remained in federal ownership; only after the Bit Act of 1854, which cut prices by 90%, did private men purchase most of the remaining lands. The county was organized in 1818 from parts of Gallatin, Jackson, and White counties, with the location of the county seat to be determined by a commission of three. The commission chose the house of one Moses Garrett to serve as the temporary seat of government; it remained in use until a small courthouse and jail were built at Frankfort in 1826. However, the separation of southern Franklin County in 1839 to form Williamson County left the formerly central Frankfort far south of most of the rest of the county; the remnant residents obtained legislative consent to move the seat to a more convenient location, and the new town of Benton was platted in a field in January 1841. A temporary frame courthouse was erected within a few months, but it was soon sold for relocation and conversion into a residence, and a new brick courthouse opened in 1845.

== Fourth Courthouse ==
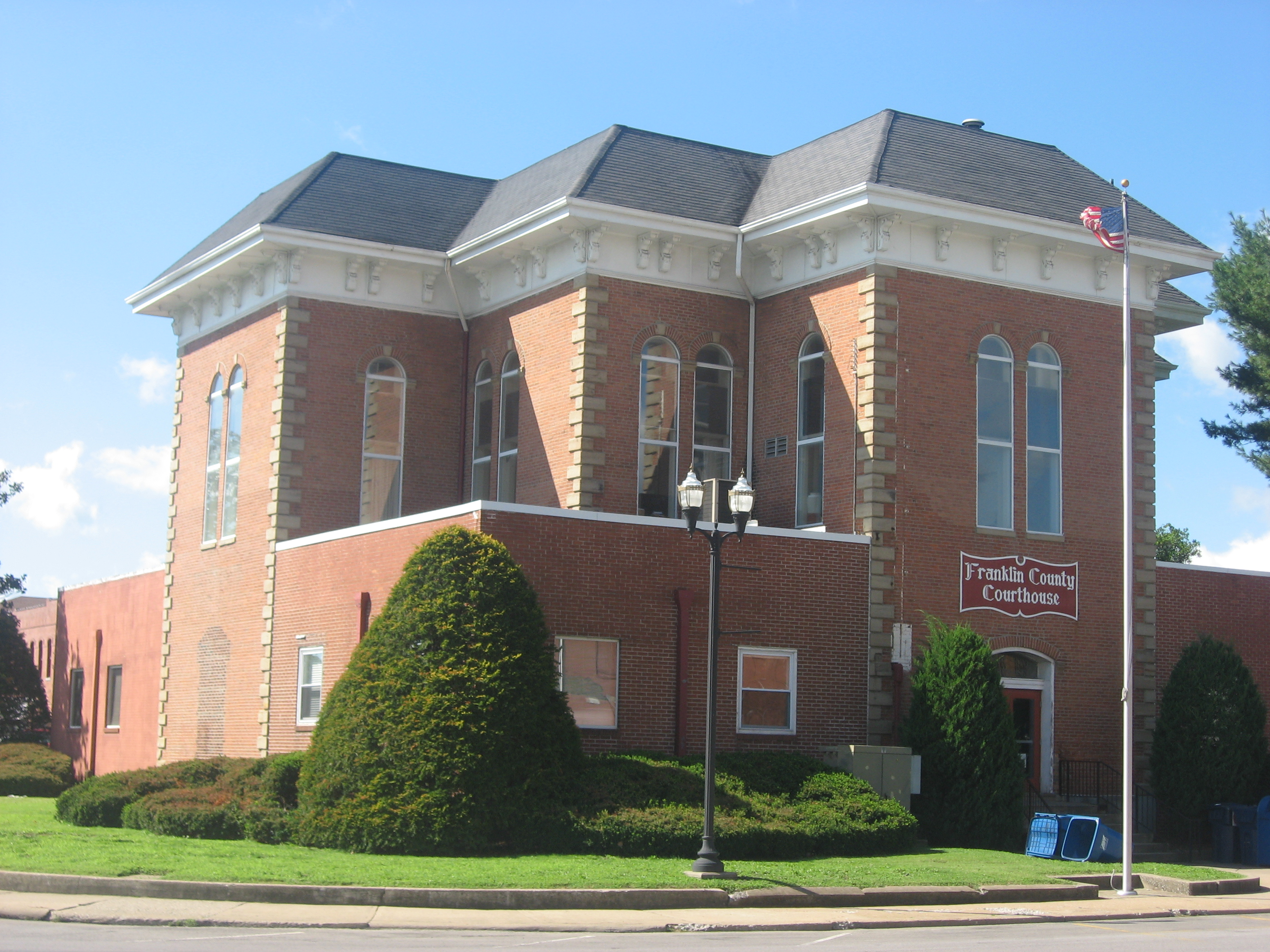
Eastern and northern sides

The fourth Franklin County Courthouse was a government building in central Benton, the county seat of Franklin County, Illinois, United States. Built in 1874 to replace an older structure that could no longer serve the county's needs, it was the fourth building to serve as a courthouse for Franklin County. Demolition of the building started on Aug. 5, 2020, and was completed within the month. The new courthouse, inaugurated on April 22, 2022, was built on the same location.

As the county developed, this third courthouse began to prove insufficient, and the commissioners' court planned for its replacement in 1870. Poor harvests (and thus unexpectedly low tax revenues) forced the project's postponement, and only in 1874 could local contractor John J. St. Clair erect the current courthouse. He was paid $24,000 to build the new structure, into which he incorporated many bricks from the previous courthouse. A two-story building, it originally was divided into offices on the first floor and into a courtroom and jury rooms on the second. All early county records having been destroyed by an 1845 fire in the county clerk's office, St. Clair included fireproof vaults for records storage in his new design.

Prominent architectural features of the Italianate courthouse include a hip roof supported by brackets under the eaves, large stone quoins on the corners of the brick walls, and pairs of narrow arch windows on the second floor. The original plan was functionally a square with projections at the center of each side, leaving an L-shaped area of open land at each corner, but these corners were filled in with plain single-story sections after 1900.

== See also ==
- Franklin County Jail
