= Jann Carl =

American television personality (born 1960)

- Born: May 19, 1960 (age 66); Carthage, Missouri, U.S.
- Education: University of Missouri
- Occupations: Television host, reporter and journalist
- Awards: Three Emmy Awards and the 61st Annual Distinguished Service Award from the University of Missouri Alumni Association in 2016
- Website: http://www.smalltownbigdeal.com

Jann Carl (born May 19, 1960) is an American co-host and part owner of the syndicated TV show Small Town Big Deal. Carl and her co-host, Rodney K. Miller, report on uplifting stories about people, places and events throughout communities big and small across the United States. The show first aired on September 6, 2012, on the RFD-TV cable network. Small Town Big Deal has aired almost 100 episodes since 2012 and is now viewed on network and local television stations in nearly 80 percent of the United States.

== Career ==
Carl is also well known for her 14 years at Entertainment Tonight. She is nationally respected for her interviews with influential newsmakers. Some of the most famous include Brad Pitt, Oprah Winfrey, Tom Cruise, Steven Spielberg, Tom Hanks, Diane Sawyer and Barack and Michelle Obama. She began as a news reporter at WLS-TV in Chicago. She later moved to Los Angeles, where she reported for KABC-TV, and hosted KABC’s Eye on L.A. magazine show alongside Chuck Henry.

Throughout the late 1980s and early 1990s, Carl was the co-anchor with the late Los Angeles broadcast legend Hal Fishman at KTLA where she earned three Emmys. Later, Carl was an executive producer of the show Sold! for the History Channel.

Carl has appeared on Candid Camera and America’s Next Top Model. She has co-hosted the “Oscar Countdown” Academy Award show, the Emmy pre-show, the Jerry Lewis MDA Telethon and the Tournament of Roses Parade on CBS and HGTV.

Carl serves as an Assistant Professional Practice Professor at the University of Missouri School of Journalism.

== Personal life ==
Carl was born in Carthage, Missouri. She graduated from the University of Missouri School of Journalism. Carl has been associated with Muscular Dystrophy Association for more than 25 years. After co-hosting the MDA Labor Day Telethon in Los Angeles for eight years, she was chosen by Jerry Lewis as a national co-host in 1996. Carl says that MDA and those with muscular dystrophy "are a family." She marked her 17th year on the coast-to-coast broadcast in 2012. She has also served on MDA's national board of directors, and as a national vice president. MDA has recognized her contributions with the Directors’ Award and the Paragon Award. In addition to her service for the Muscular Dystrophy Association, Carl is a supporter of her alma mater, University of Missouri. She has performed as the school's tiger mascot as well as serving as Mizzou Homecoming Grand Marshal. Carl has also served as the master of ceremonies for the "Model Citizen" fashion shows. These shows benefit the MU Thompson center for Autisim and Neurodevelopmental Disorders. In November 2016, the University of Missouri Alumni Association awarded Carl the "Distinguished Service Award", the highest award bestowed upon a University of Missouri alum.

== Filmography ==
=== Film ===
Year	Title	Role	Notes
1990	Captain America	Herself	credited as Jann T. Carl
1998	Bulworth	Carl Jann	
2001	Josie and the Pussycats	Herself	credited as Jann T. Carl

=== Television ===
Year	Title	Role	Notes
1995 - 2008	Entertainment Tonight		
2009	Wow! Wow! Wubbzy!	Jann Starl	3 episodes
2012 - present	Small Town Big Deal	herself	co-host
