= Benton Public Library =

Public library in Benton, Illinois

- 37°59′28″N 88°55′12″W
- Location: 502 South Main St, Benton, Illinois, USA
- Type: Public
- Established: May 1916

Collection
- Size: 48,975

Access and use
- Circulation: 27,829
- Population served: 10,170

Other information
- Director: Susan Stickel
- Employees: 15
- Website: www.bentonlibrary.com

Benton Public Library serves the town of Benton, Illinois, and the residents of the Benton Public Library District. The library is located at 502 S. Main St. in Benton.

== History ==
Benton Public Library was established in May 1916.

In 1929, Andrew S. Cleveland donated his home to the library. The building was remodeled and officially dedicated on September 20, 1930. The building was destroyed by fire in 1955.

A new library building was constructed and opened on July 23, 1956.

The library has been located at this address for over 80 years and has operated in the current building since November 2005.
