= Carl Choisser =

American newspaper editor, lawyer, and politician

William Carl Choisser (July 10, 1895 – September 25, 1939) was an assassinated American politician, lawyer, and newspaper editor.

Choisser was born in Ozark, Johnson County, Illinois. In 1917, he graduated from the University of Illinois College of Law, where he received a bachelor of laws, and was on the varsity wrestling team. He then served in the United States Army Air Service during World War I. Choisser practiced law in Benton, Illinois, and was the editor of the Benton Evening News. He served as a Republican member of the Illinois House of Representatives from 1923 to 1929. Choisser was murdered in 1939 with a firearm in Benton, Illinois, after a quarrel with a defendant involving a murder trial.
