= The Benton Evening News =

The Benton News
- Type: Daily newspaper
- Owner(s): Paddock Publications
- Publisher: Southern Illinois LOCAL Media Group
- Editor: Geoff Ritter
- Founded: January 2, 1922
- ISSN: 1089-9537
- Website: bentoneveningnews.com

The Benton News is an American weekly newspaper published in Benton, Illinois.

In addition to Benton, the Evening News covers Christopher, Sesser and Thompsonville, and Franklin County.
