= William A. Denning =

American judge

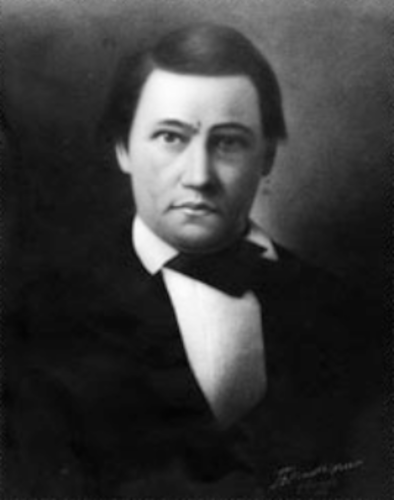
Denning's portrait at the Illinois Supreme Court.

William A. Denning (c. 1817 – September 4, 1856) was an American jurist and politician.

Born in Kentucky, Denning moved to Frankfort, Illinois to practiced law. He then moved to Benton, Illinois when the county seat for Franklin County, Illinois was relocated from Frankfort to Benton. From 1844 to 1847, Denning served in the Illinois House of Representatives and was a Democrat. From 1847 to 1848, Denning served on the Illinois Supreme Court and resigned in 1848 when the Illinois Constitution of 1848 went into effect. He then served as Illinois Circuit Court judge in 1848 and served until 1854, Denning died in Benton, Illinois.
