= Ernest J. Odum =

American politician

Ernest James Odum (November 15, 1882–October 1, 1919) was an American lawyer and politician.

Odum was born in Benton, Illinois, He went to the public schools and graduated from Benton High School. He went to Ewing College in Benton and studied law in St. Louis, Missouri. Odum was admitted to the Illinois bar and he practiced law in Benton. He served as the Benton city attorney and was involved with the Republican Party. Odum serve in the Illinois House of Representatives in 1917 and 1918. He died at a hospital in Anna, Illinois.
