= Rodney K. Miller =

American television personality

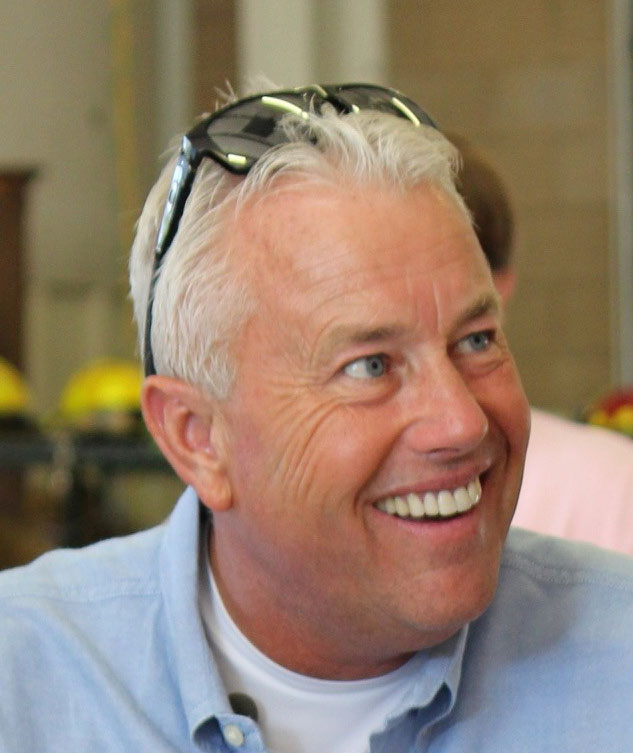
- Education: Benton Consolidated High School and Rend Lake College
- Occupations: Television host, farmer, entrepreneur
- Awards: Alumnus of the Year (2009) from Benton Consolidated High School
- Website: smalltownbigdeal.com

Rodney Miller is the creator and co-host of Small Town Big Deal, an American nationally syndicated broadcast and cable television show. Miller and co-host Jann Carl, a former TV reporter and weekend anchor with Entertainment Tonight, travel the country sharing uplifting stories about American communities and people. Small Town Big Deal first aired on September 6, 2012, on the RFD-TV cable network. Since then, Small Town Big Deal has entered national broadcast syndication and appears on over 150 local stations (80 percent of the United States) each week. It also began broadcasting on the Armed Forces Network in the Fall of 2017.

Prior to television, Miller was an executive in the agricultural machinery industry as CEO of Montana Tractors in Springdale, Arkansas, and McCormick International, USA in Duluth, Georgia. A businessman, farmer, and entrepreneur, he also operates the Buford Corn Maze in the Atlanta metro area. Miller has said that "in a lot of ways the maze is a symbol of my life. I did not take the straight path, and I had a lot of failures – but I never gave up chasing my dream." The maze is open from early September to late November each year. Miller is a supporter and board member with the Georgia AgriTourism Association.

Miller was born in McLeansboro, Illinois, and grew up on a farm near Benton, Illinois as a fourth-generation farmer, by his parents John Eugene Miller and Elizabeth Emmagene Miller (Tate), who were devout born again Christians and raised him as such. Miller considers his faith in Jesus Christ as "the greatest blessing in his life". In Southern Illinois, he graduated from Akin Grade School, Benton Consolidated High School, and Rend Lake College. He was honored as " Alumnus of the Year" in 2009 at BCHS. He and his wife, Kendra, live on a farm near Ocilla, Georgia, and operate a farm in southern Illinois. They have three children and two grandchildren. In his free time, Miller enjoys collecting, repairing and restoring antique tractors and equipment to their original pristine condition.
