= The Jerry Lewis MDA Labor Day Telethon =

American telethon

- Logo used for the telethon in 2011
- Also known as: MDA Labor Day Telethon; MDA Show of Strength; The MDA Kevin Hart Kids Telethon
- Presented by: Jerry Lewis (1966–2010); Nigel Lythgoe (2011); Jann Carl (2011–2014); Alison Sweeney (2011–2014); Nancy O'Dell (2011–2014)
- Narrated by: Johnny Olson (1966–1972); Ed McMahon (1973–2008); Shawn Parr (2009–2014)
- Opening theme: "Smile" by Charlie Chaplin (1966–2012); "Stronger (What Doesn't Kill You)" (Instrumental version) by Kelly Clarkson (2013)
- Ending theme: "You'll Never Walk Alone" by Rodgers and Hammerstein (1966–2010); "God Bless America" by Irving Berlin (2011); "You've Got a Friend" by Carole King (2012); "Lean on Me" by Bill Withers (2013); "Give" by LeAnn Rimes (2014)
- Country of origin: United States
- Original language: English
- No. of episodes: 45

Production
- Executive producer: R. A. Clark (2012–2014)
- Camera setup: Multi-camera
- Running time: 1,290 minutes (1966–2010); 360 minutes (2011); 180 minutes (2012); 120 minutes (2013–2014)
- Production companies: Muscular Dystrophy Association (national segments); Various local stations (local segments; 1968–2012)

Original release
- Network: WNEW-TV (1966–1967); Syndication (1968–2012); ABC (2013–2014)
- Release: September 4, 1966 – August 31, 2014

The MDA Labor Day Telethon was an annual telethon held the night before and through Labor Day in the United States to raise money for the Muscular Dystrophy Association (MDA). The Muscular Dystrophy Association was founded in 1950 with hopes of gaining the American public's interest. The show was hosted by comedian, actor, singer and filmmaker Jerry Lewis from its 1966 inception until 2010. The history of MDA's telethon dates back to the 1950s, when the Jerry Lewis Thanksgiving Party for MDA raised funds for the organization's New York City area operations. The telethon was held annually on Labor Day weekend beginning in 1966, and raised $2.45 billion for MDA from its inception through 2009.

For most of its run, the telethon was syndicated nationwide to individual local television stations, regardless of network affiliation, and aired for up to 21 1/2 hours starting on the Sunday evening preceding Labor Day and continuing until late Monday afternoon of the holiday itself. MDA called its network of participating stations that aired the telecast, the "Love Network". The show originated from Las Vegas for 28 of the years it was broadcast. Beginning in 2011 and coinciding with Lewis's departure, MDA radically reformatted and shortened the telethon's format into that of a benefit concert, airing exclusively on the Sunday evening before Labor Day and shortening the length of the special each successive year. The 2011 edition reduced the telecast to six hours, and was syndicated to approximately 160 television stations throughout the United States on September 4. Nigel Lythgoe, Jann Carl, Alison Sweeney and Nancy O'Dell were brought on as co-hosts and shared hosting duties for that year’s edition.

Successive telethons from 2012 to 2014 ran under the new title MDA Show of Strength and further reduced the show's airtime. The 2012 edition, which aired on Sunday, September 2, ceased referring to the broadcast as a "telethon" and was reduced to a three-hour, primetime-only broadcast airing at 8 p.m. Eastern and Pacific Time; that year’s edition was televised live only in the Eastern and Central time zones, and tape delayed in the rest of the country. The 2013 Show of Strength, airing on Sunday, September 1, and running for two hours, discontinued the broadcast’s long-standing syndication distribution format and aired for the first time as a national network telecast on ABC. The final edition aired on ABC on August 31, 2014, again as a two-hour special, beginning at 9:00 p.m. ET/PT. On May 1, 2015, the MDA announced that it would discontinue the annual event. The MDA revisited the national telethon concept on October 24, 2020 and again in 2021 with a new social media-based telethon, The MDA Kevin Hart Kids Telethon.

== History ==
=== Prior to 1966 ===
Jerry Lewis began hosting telethons to benefit the Muscular Dystrophy Associations of America (MDAA) in 1952 after a plea from a staff member who worked with Lewis and Dean Martin on The Colgate Comedy Hour. Lewis had previously taken part in what has been described as the very first telethon, a marathon 1951 broadcast benefiting a cardiac hospital that was organized by Budd Granoff, which featured the Martin and Lewis comedy team, who were his clients at that time.

The MDAA benefit broadcasts first originated from a variety of locations in New York City in 1954, as local telethons seen exclusively on WABD (later WNEW-TV and now WNYW) or WABC-TV, who donated their broadcast time for the event. Lewis hosted several four-hour shows in the New York area and elsewhere to benefit MDAA and promote the battle against muscular dystrophy during the later 1950s and early 1960s. By the mid-1960s, the success of those shows convinced MDAA to stage a telethon to support MDA's New York efforts, with Lewis agreeing to host the big event when approached by the organization.

According to the MDA's website, on December 28, 1951, Dean Martin and Jerry Lewis concluded their popular NBC show with a special appeal to support muscular dystrophy research. MDA's website additionally states that the second national appeal was during its January 4, 1952 network radio program.

MDA's website lists five early local MDA telethons: Cleveland on March 7, 1952; Atlanta on June 6 and 7, 1952; Washington, D.C., on December 26 and 27, 1952; Grand Rapids, Michigan, on June 27 and 28, 1953; and Madison, Wisconsin on September 12 and 13, 1953. These telethons did not star or feature Jerry Lewis, but were hosted by other stars such as Dick Van Dyke, Robert Alda, Virginia Graham, and Al Hodge in character as Captain Video.

On June 29 and 30, 1956, Martin and Lewis hosted an MDAA telethon called The Martin and Lewis Roundup, live from Carnegie Hall. The pair ended their comedy partnership a month later, and Lewis was named national chairman of MDAA later that year. Lewis went on to host Thanksgiving Day telethons in 1957 and 1959.

=== 1966 through the 1970s ===
By the mid-1960s, organizers of the telethon chose Labor Day weekend to stage their event, as it was the only time frame made available to hold it. Many, however, expected the Labor Day broadcast would fail, as many people would have traveled out of town and/or be away from their television sets during the holiday weekend; even New York City officials were skeptical that it would succeed, which made them reluctant to issue a fund-raising permit to the MDAA, though one would indeed be granted at the urging of Robert Ross, MDAA's then-Executive Director.

The first MDA Labor Day Telethon was held the weekend of September 4 and 5, 1966. Broadcast by local independent station WNEW-TV, the event was staged at New York's Americana Hotel, with a stage featuring a talk show-style desk and seating area for Lewis and performers, a performance area for a 19-piece jazz band, phone banks, and a large tote board to keep track of donations received. Proving the doubters wrong, the event was so successful that Lewis had to climb a ladder and paint a seventh digit, a "1," on the six-digit tote board when the final total reached $1,002,114 ($9,991,695.17 in 2025 dollars.) The show repeated its success in 1967, raising $1,126,846 ($10,898,962.47 in 2025 dollars.)

Emboldened by positive word of mouth generated from the telethon's success in attracting both donations and celebrity appearances, the event's organizers sought out a wider audience in 1968 by offering a live broadcast to stations outside the New York City market. Before that, however, approval needed to be gained from the Theater Authority, an organization that represented theatrical-related talent unions whose permission was required before their membership could perform at benefits, such as telethons, without reimbursement. MDA gained the Theater Authority's permission and proceed to form a family of stations that was later billed as "The Love Network." Joining WNEW-TV in that 1968 telecast were:

- WGR-TV in Buffalo, New York (known today as WGRZ)
- WHEC-TV in Rochester, New York
- WKBG-TV in Boston, Massachusetts (known today as WLVI-TV)
- WTEV in New Bedford, Massachusetts (known today as WLNE-TV)
- WMUR-TV in Manchester, New Hampshire

Buoyed by the Love Network's reach, the 1968 Labor Day Telethon generated $1,401,876 in donations. Though the original intent was for the stations to carry the entire 1968 telethon broadcast, breaking only for mandatory station identifications, WHEC-TV chose to break away for a few minutes every hour to show Rochester area volunteers taking donation calls. As a result, WHEC-TV generated more proceeds than the other Love Network stations. With WHEC's move, the "local cutaway" was born: from that point forward, every Telethon broadcast granted local stations cutaway time, usually five or ten minutes per hour, to allow local celebrities, volunteers, and sponsors to highlight fundraising efforts and the services MDAA provided at the local level, with the intention of building local goodwill toward MDAA, its local chapters, and the Love Network stations. The cutaways became an integral part of every MDA Telethon broadcast during its syndication run, an approach later duplicated by other nationally-syndicated charitable telethons.

By 1970, the MDA Labor Day Telethon was seen nationwide on 64 stations, including the addition of Los Angeles and San Francisco stations to the Love Network roster, making the 1970 event the first telethon seen from coast to coast. Proceeds from the 1970 event totaled $5,093,385. The show continued to gain popularity and major stars through the next two years, helped in part by the Theater Authority permanently lifting its ban on nationwide telethon performances by its members in 1970 (at the MDA's appeal).

In 1973, with 150 Love Network stations in tow, the telethon moved to Las Vegas, Nevada, where it originated at the Sahara Hotel. That year, Lewis explained the mission of the MDA with his comment: "God goofed, and it's up to us to correct His mistakes." The 1973 telethon was also when the event broke the $10 million mark for the first time (the final tote being $12,395,973). Co-host Ed McMahon made an on-air prediction that donations would surpass $10 million (one digit more than the seven digits the Solari tote board could accommodate); at the moment it did, he came on stage to tell Lewis, "I have a brush, and I have some paint..." and Lewis repeated his 1966 stunt by painting a "1" on the board, this time punctuating it by wiping the paintbrush up and down the front of his tuxedo in celebration. An additional Solari number flipper was added the next year, allowing a display of under $100 million.

In 1976, the Love Network grew to a peak of 213 stations, effectively making it America's fourth major television network, if only for 21 1/2 hours. The 1976 telethon was also perhaps the most memorable one in the MDA's history, highlighted by the emotional reunion of Jerry and his former partner, Dean Martin, arranged by frequent telethon guest and mutual friend Frank Sinatra. It was the first time Martin and Lewis were seen together publicly since they separated their act in 1956. The 1976 telethon also was one of the most-watched, drawing more than 85 million viewers, according to the A.C. Nielsen ratings service.

In 1979, donations were a record $30 million.

=== 1980s–1990s ===
During the telethon's Las Vegas years in the 1970s and 1980s, the show originated at the Sahara until 1982 when it moved to a bigger space at Caesars Palace. The show continued there until 1989 when it originated from the Cashman Center in Las Vegas – the only time it was broadcast from a Las Vegas-area venue that was not a hotel and the first time it originated from a venue physically located within the city of Las Vegas itself. Lewis always anchored the entire broadcast which ran 21 1/2 hours ever since 1973. That said, in 1983 he rested for a few hours offstage, having undergone cardiac-bypass surgery the year before, but he returned to full force in 1984. In 1986, the telethon had a three-way live simulcast during the 8:30 a.m. half-hour, including Today on NBC and Good Morning America on ABC. In 1990, the telethon originated from the Aquarius Theater in Los Angeles, then returned to Las Vegas and the Sahara Hotel until 1995 when it moved again to Southern California, to CBS Television City for nine years and then in 2005 to Beverly Hills. In 1998, MDA's all-star landmark show became the first to be broadcast on the Internet by RealNetworks on the association's website. During this time, Lewis got annoyed when local station cut-ins came back late or when WGN-TV pre-empted part of the telethon for a Chicago Cubs game.

After the telethon, the site featured a special highlights reel of the telethon for that year. Lewis still continued to host at least 16 hours of his telethon until 1999 (a year when he had various medical issues), where he appeared for the first five hours and the last five hours of the telecast, with an extended pre-recorded segment presented during late-night hours, and other celebrities filling in for Lewis and Ed McMahon during the morning hours. Co-hosts have included talk show host Larry King, comedians Norm Crosby, Elayne Boosler, Bob Zany, television personalities Chad Everett, David Hartman, Casey Kasem, Jann Carl, Leeza Gibbons, John Tesh, veteran singers Tony Orlando, Julius LaRosa (who began co-hosting for Lewis from remote locations in 1975), and many others.

=== 2000s–2010s ===
The telethon returned to Las Vegas in 2006 at the South Point Hotel, Casino & Spa (which was the "South Coast" its first year there), a complex owned by a friend of Lewis, Michael Gaughan, and remained there through the 2011 telethon. In 2007, Lewis caused a stir when he used a gay slur during the 18th hour of the telethon apparently believing his microphone was off. Lewis later apologized. In 2009, the telethon extended its coverage to social media, with followers on Twitter, Facebook and YouTube receiving additional information and behind-the scenes material. Beginning in 2010, viewers could also text their pledges for an automatic $10 donation, aside from texting charges. Through 2010, the national segments of the telethon were not broadcast in high definition, though some stations broadcast their local segments in HD. The 2010 edition was syndicated to approximately 190 Love Network affiliates throughout the United States.

==== 2011 cutback, overhaul and Lewis's departure ====
On October 6, 2010, the MDA announced that the telethon would be trimmed back considerably, to six hours, beginning with the 2011 edition televised on September 4, 2011. This new version of the telethon, broadcast from 6 p.m. to 12 midnight local time on the Sunday preceding Labor Day only, was in response to lagging donations, stations showing only part of the telethon or dropping it altogether, and the less-than-stellar talent in recent telethons – as well as Lewis, whose career as a film star and comedian was dwindling, was now in his mid-80s and devoting less and less time appearing on-air due to his age and health. The telethon, seen live in the Eastern Time Zone and tape-delayed in the rest of the country, was revamped in order to attract more stations to the Love Network (which had shrunk from its peak of 213 stations in 1976 to 190 in 2010), as well as to attract more top celebrities and talent to the show, resulting in more viewers and donations. The other aspects of the telethon, such as corporate donations, stories from those who relied on the MDA's help, and local segments, remained, though local segments were restricted to two 7- to 8-minute segments every hour. Stars featured in the first short-form version included Lady Antebellum, Martina McBride and Darius Rucker, in pre-taped segments from the Grand Ole Opry in Nashville, Tennessee, the judges of American Idol (Jennifer Lopez, Steven Tyler, and Randy Jackson), Celine Dion, Jon Secada, Tommy Emmanuel, Richie Sambora, Jimmy Webb, Michael Feinstein, Maureen McGovern, Jordin Sparks and Greyson Chance. The 2011 telethon was the first edition to broadcast the national segments in high definition; the broadcast of local segments in HD remained optional for the station.

On May 16, 2011, it was first announced by the MDA that the 2011 edition of the telethon would be Lewis's last as host, and that he would continue his role as MDA's National Chairman, still appearing at the close of each telethon, to sing his signature closing song, "You'll Never Walk Alone". In a press conference with the Television Critics Association's summer press tour in late July 2011, Lewis denied that he ever said it would be his last telethon, would not elaborate on his role in the current telethon (stating that it was "none of your business"), and announced he would indicate his future plans the day after the telethon broadcast, citing "I will have plenty to say about what I think is important." At the same conference, Lewis criticized the reality television shows his telethon co-hosts were involved in – Lythgoe's American Idol, which Lewis said featured contestants who were "McDonald's Wipeouts"; and Sweeney's The Biggest Loser, a series which Lewis claims is about contestants "knocking their brains out trying to see how we beat the fat lady at 375 pounds, and in four months she's going to be 240. Who cares? It's ridiculous."

The MDA announced on August 3, 2011, that Lewis had "completed his run" as both host and national chairman, effective immediately, and that Lewis would not appear in the 2011 telethon. The wording of the release left it ambiguous whether he had been fired or if he had resigned. The MDA also confirmed that Lythgoe, O'Dell, Sweeney, and Carl, all slated to be co-hosts under Lewis, would share hosting duties; the MDA left the position of national chairman unfilled. Numerous celebrities came out in support of Lewis and opposed to his dismissal from the MDA shortly after it was announced; Lewis himself was mostly silent about the issue, saying that the controversy is "very difficult to get into." On August 21, 2011, the Las Vegas Review-Journal released a report stating that the MDA reinstated Lewis as host of the telethon; however, Lewis's publicist denied that report. The following day, on August 22, 2011, the Review-Journal retracted the report, saying that Lewis had not been invited back to the telethon; the source close to Lewis said that the MDA had reconciled with Lewis, not reinstated Lewis.

In addition, admission to the telethon by the general public was severely restricted, due to the cut in the length of the telethon, and the cut in the length of the local segments; in previous years, the telethon used the local segment time to swap audiences. Most of the attending audience members were representatives and invited guests of sponsors and major donors.

Despite Lewis's departure and anything that took place backstage, the 2011 telethon's hosts paid tribute to Lewis with a one-minute montage of clips of him hosting the telethon over the years. During the presentation, the hosts said that Lewis "retired" from his position as host.

Following the telethon, Lythgoe commented that he was sorry that Lewis did not take part, but that the show had to move on to ensure its survival, and added that he was welcome to make an appearance on the telethon anytime, saying that the annual event was "his baby." Lythgoe also said that the orchestra had contingency plans in place in the event Lewis did show up, either live or pre-recorded, to sing his signature song, "You'll Never Walk Alone", but never showed up at the venue. Lewis's publicist Candy Cazau did not comment to the Associated Press about contingency plans, but had said earlier that Lewis did not agree to make any appearances on the show. The song used at the close of the show was "God Bless America", sung by a large children's choir, all the hosts and performers from the show, following renditions of "America the Beautiful", "Strike Up the Band", and "The Stars and Stripes Forever".

==== 2012 edition: The "Show of Strength" ====
On February 10, 2012, the MDA announced that the 2012 edition would be cut to three hours (from six hours the previous year), airing during primetime on Sunday, September 2, 2012, still syndicated to the Love Network stations. The 2012 edition, renamed the MDA Show of Strength (moving away from its heritage as a telethon), was executive-produced by R. A. Clark, a producer and son of Dick Clark. The show was also seen first-run in the Atlantic, Eastern and Central time zones at 8 p.m. ET/7 p.m. CT, with the special tape-delayed in the Western time zones at 8 p.m. PT/7 p.m. MT. The venue segments and hosts varied, depending on the local networks airing it. The majority of the pre-produced performances were taped in Los Angeles and New York City, airing on various broadcast and cable channels in 150 markets around the United States. While there was not a traditional tote board tallying donations from local hosts in their respective cities, the overall event urged national phone, text and website pledges toward funding efforts to find treatments and cures for neuromuscular diseases.

Performers and guest appearance included Brandy, Maryse Ouellet, The Miz, Carrie Underwood, Luke Bryan, Tim McGraw, Lou Ferrigno, Eva Simons, Max Adler, Paula Abdul, Khloé Kardashian, Alison Sweeney, Diana DeGarmo and B.o.B, among others. Additional guests appearing in pre-recorded segments from CBS Television City in Hollywood, taped August 7 to August 9, 2012, included OneRepublic, Brandy, The All American Rejects, Hot Chelle Rae, Karmin, will.i.am, Big Bad Voodoo Daddy, Silhouettes, Carole King, Reagan Imhoff, Pitbull, Gavin DeGraw and Alanis Morissette, among others. Portions with country artists were recorded at the Grand Ole Opry in Nashville, Tennessee.

The majority of the program was pre-recorded. Entertainment Tonight co-anchor Nancy O'Dell and KKGO (Los Angeles) deejay Shawn Parr introduced the majority of national segments. For the second straight year, the show closed with a different song. Carole King performed her song "You've Got A Friend" with a montage of the featured patients with muscular dystrophy in her background. The local segments were also mainly pre-recorded, and check presentations from companies which sponsored MDA were replaced by public service announcements from those companies, which, in previous years, had often been part of the presentations.

==== 2013 Show of Strength Telethon ====
On June 17, 2013, the MDA announced on Twitter that the "Show of Strength" would air on Sunday, September 1, 2013. For the first time, the show aired nationally on ABC, in effect bringing an end to the Love Network of individual stations (the majority of which were ABC affiliates). The show was cut from three hours to two, airing beginning at 9 p.m. ET/PT. The local segments were discontinued (phone pledges were accepted solely through a national toll-free number, instead of being collected directly by each station for the individual local or regional chapters of the MDA). The 2013 edition was the first to be broadcast with commercial interruption, although breaks consisted primarily of promos for ABC shows and local advertisements on ABC's stations, however many stations carried spots mentioning donations made by corporate entities during the breaks.

The show included appearances by Darius Rucker, Lee Ann Womack, Austin Mahone, Backstreet Boys, Enrique Iglesias, Ryan Seacrest, Paula Abdul, Matthew Morrison, Vintage Trouble, Kenny Loggins and the Blue Sky Riders, Chris Mann, Jessica Sanchez, Jann Carl, Florence Henderson, Bart Conner, Nadia Comăneci, Dr. Richard E. Besser, and Jabbawockeez. Performances were taped in early August at CBS Television City in Los Angeles. The show also featured the 2012 performances from Luke Bryan, Carole King, and Pitbull.

The show's theme song was the instrumental from "Stronger (What Doesn't Kill You)" by Kelly Clarkson. For the third straight year, the show ended with a different number; this time, with a performance of Bill Withers's "Lean On Me", led by Jessica Sanchez and Chris Mann featuring MDA patients and families present at the show's taping.

==== 2014: the last Show of Strength Telethon ====
The 2014 edition aired on Sunday, August 31, on ABC. Taping for the 2014 Show took place during May and June 2014, at the Palladium in Los Angeles and the Grand Ole Opry in Nashville. It is the earliest time of recording for the telethon in show history.

Performers included Jason Derulo, Fall Out Boy, Rascal Flatts, Jordin Sparks, R5, Bret Michaels, Sara Evans, LeAnn Rimes, Aloe Blacc, Matt Nathanson, and American Authors. Others who appeared were Kesha, Ludacris, Brad Paisley, Laila Ali, Nancy O'Dell, Alyssa Milano, Kevin Frazier, Terry Fator, Victor Ortíz, Dr. Richard E. Besser, Josh Groban, Charles Esten, Tom Bergeron, Chris Powell and Susan Lucci.

One of the main themes of the show was the organization's partnership with the International Association of Firefighters, who celebrated their 60th anniversary in supporting MDA, mainly through their annual Fill the Boot campaign. IAFF General President Harold A. Schaitberger announced on the show that the IAFF has donated over $561 million to the MDA over the 60 years, including $28 million for this year's show.

This year's show closed with a tribute to the firefighters, with LeAnn Rimes performing her song Give.

=== Cancellation ===
On May 1, 2015, MDA announced that the 2014 Show of Strength would be the telethon's last broadcast. In announcing the end of the telethon's 49-year run, MDA President and CEO Steven Derks noted the move was influenced by "the new realities of television viewing and philanthropic giving", noting the viral success of the Ice Bucket Challenge that built awareness and funds to combat amyotrophic lateral sclerosis (ALS). Instead, MDA will focus on "new, creative and organic ways" to raise support for the organization and its mission, including mobile and digital media.

==== 2016 endorsement ====
In 2016, Lewis broke a five-year silence by appearing in an online video endorsing MDA's redesigned web site, declaring that the work MDA started must go on. It would turn out to be his final MDA appearance, as he died on August 20, 2017 at the age of 91.

=== 2017: Return to local telethons ===
Following the cancellation of the national telethon, some stations continued the tradition, producing local telethons, bringing such use in full circle, as the MDA telethon originated as a local program. One of these include former Love Network affiliate KSDK in St. Louis, Missouri, which began broadcasting their own telethon in 2017 under the MDA Show of Strength name, following the cancellation of the ABC telethon; KSDK's telethon was produced as a benefit on behalf of the MDA's St. Louis chapter. Unlike the telethons of years past, KSDK's telethon was only 90 minutes in length as of its 2020 edition, which aired Sunday, September 6, 2020 from 10:30 p.m. to 12 midnight CDT.

=== 2020: MDA Launches Social Media Telethon ===
On September 9, 2020, MDA's national executives announced plans for a global, multi platform streaming broadcast, titled The MDA Kevin Hart Kids Telethon. The new two-hour telethon featured comedian Kevin Hart as host of the program. Unlike traditional telethons, which were broadcast via television stations and networks, the MDA Kids Telethon was broadcast only through social media platforms. Coinciding with several weeks of charity gaming events entitled MDA Let’s Play For A Cure, the first telethon was seen October 24, 2020 at 8 p.m. EDT. This was MDA's resumption of a national telethon since its final broadcast edition in 2014, and the first streamed exclusively online (the last several years of the telethon during the Love Network years were simulcast both on standard television and online, beginning in 1998). The telethon was a dual-charity event, with proceeds going towards both MDA and Hart's own charity, "Help From The Hart", which used their portion of funds raised to "support education, health and social needs programs targeting under-served communities and servicing youth through education scholarships". A second Kevin Hart MDA telethon was held online in 2021, but the telethon itself hasn't been held since then.

== Ed McMahon ==
Early in 1973, Lewis asked Ed McMahon to be his co-host for the show and McMahon continued in that role. Similar to his regular position as announcer and sidekick of The Tonight Show Starring Johnny Carson, McMahon was Lewis's announcer, voicing the intros and outros of each segment, welcoming corporate and charitable sponsors with their donations, and calling for a roll of a timpani drum for each million dollar mark passed on the tote board (Johnny Carson himself, a longtime friend of Lewis, surprised viewers by opening the 1970 telethon with a Tonight Show-style monologue while Lewis stood backstage – a role that Carson repeated in 1971 and 1972, until the telethon moved to Las Vegas). McMahon, borrowing from Carson's prognosticating character "Carnac the Magnificent", also made predictions on what the final total of funds raised would be, and from 1970 though 1979, he was spot on many years, missing by as little as thousands of dollars, considering the final tallies. The practice was abandoned after the 1982 telethon raised $2 million less than the previous year (which Lewis attributed to the severe 1980–1982 recession that had gripped the U.S.). The trend of taking a break during the telethon was started in 1985 by McMahon. Much like his role with Carson, McMahon would co-host only when Lewis was hosting, with his duties as co-host filled in by others when Lewis was away. McMahon died June 23, 2009. The 2009 edition of the telethon paid tribute to McMahon with a special video tribute narrated by Lewis, which played during the first hour of the show. Following the tribute, Lewis introduced McMahon's wife, Pamela, who was in the audience. During the telethon for that year, Jann Carl assumed McMahon's duties during Lewis's hours on-air, while Shawn Parr billboarded the start and end of each segment.

== Scheduling ==
For most of its run, the telethon ran live for 21 1/2 hours, ending at 6:30 p.m. ET on Labor Day Monday. During the 2000s, the telethon would end its national segments shortly before 6 p.m. ET, with any remaining time going to the local stations. In recent years, more "Love Network" stations opted not to show the entire telethon, opting to join the show in progress after the 11 p.m. / 10 p.m. local news, or even on Labor Day morning, after the network morning shows.

In 2010, the last year of the full-length telethon, the telethon ran live for 20 1/2 hours, from 9 p.m. ET to 5:30 p.m. ET, though the actual start and end times varied by station. However, the MDA still considered 21 1/2 hours as the official length of the telethon, turning over the final hour, from 5:30 p.m. to 6:30 p.m. ET to its affiliate stations for local wrap-ups (some stations would elect to end at 6 or 7 p.m. ET instead (or even later), depending on the option of the station).

On September 4, 2011, the telethon was shortened to six hours, and broadcast from 6 p.m. to 12 midnight local time in each time zone, with stations in the Eastern and Atlantic Time Zones broadcasting the event live. However, as with the previous format, some stations scheduled the telethon as they saw fit – in the case of Chicago's WGN-TV, the 2011 telethon was scheduled from 6 p.m. to 1 a.m. ET (5 p.m. to 12 midnight CT), with the first hour produced locally. In addition, some network affiliates would delay the telethon to start later than 6 p.m., so that their evening newscasts and some of their network shows, such as CBS's 60 Minutes, would be seen as normally scheduled.

The telethon was again shortened in 2012, from six to three hours. Though intended to be aired at 8 p.m. in the Eastern Time Zone, at least one Eastern Time station, WMAZ-TV in Macon, Georgia, broadcast the Show of Strength from 9 p.m. to midnight.

=== Conflicts with sports ===
Some stations broke from the coverage during the afternoon of Labor Day to show sports, such as CBS's coverage of the US Open, and subsequently beginning in 2007 NBC Sports covering the Deutsche Bank Championship. One such station is WGN-TV, which, from the 1970s to 2012, pre-empted the afternoon segment of the telethon for Chicago Cubs or Chicago White Sox baseball (except for the 1994 telethon, due to the baseball strike). Meanwhile, in Seattle, KING-TV delayed the afternoon segment of the 1984 telethon because of a telecast of an NFL game between the Seattle Seahawks and the Cleveland Browns, in which NBC only aired limited coverage of the game. The game was to have taken place the day before (September 2, 1984), but the Seattle Mariners were scheduled to face the Baltimore Orioles that day.

In another case, some used a sister station affiliated with either The CW or MyNetworkTV or was an independent station to show the telethon start, and/or air the station's network programming while the telethon station continued to air the telethon; this was the case with CBS affiliate WDJT-TV in Milwaukee, Wisconsin and its independent sister station WMLW-CA, which in 2007 aired the first four hours of the telethon during CBS prime time, then aired U.S. Open coverage on Labor Day to allow WDJT to carry the telethon. In Pittsburgh, Pennsylvania, WPXI carried the telethon, while sending NBC's coverage of the Deutsche Bank Championship golf tournament to independent station WBGN-LP.

While the 2011 reformat resolved sports conflicts on Labor Day itself by ending before the actual holiday, the telethon was still subject to delays the night before in some areas. On September 4, 2011, right before 6 p.m., the Baltimore Grand Prix was scheduled on ABC, Deutsche Bank Championship golf on NBC, and U.S. Open tennis on CBS. WGN carried a Pirates-Cubs game that was scheduled to end before 5:30 p.m. ET, though it could have run over if extra innings, long innings or rain delays were involved.

In 2012, the Philadelphia Phillies game against the Atlanta Braves ran late on MyNetworkTV affiliate WPHL-TV in Philadelphia. The show was shown in its entirety immediately after the game ended. The show in Philadelphia started around 8:40 p.m.

=== Markets with no Love Network affiliate ===
In some markets, no local station carried the telethon for various reasons. In some cases, the MDA would refuse to renew a contract with a station, leaving a market with no Love Network affiliate if another station was not found in time. During the last year of the old telethon format, 2010, one example was KAME-TV in Reno, Nevada, which was dropped by the MDA that year, due to economic conditions and a decrease in pledges. Other notable markets with no Love Network affiliate in 2010 included Dothan, Alabama; Sioux City, Iowa; Yuma, Arizona; Bakersfield, California; Augusta, Georgia; Rockford, Illinois; Tupelo, Mississippi; Lincoln, Nebraska; Greensboro, Greenville and Wilmington, North Carolina; and the Tennessee Tri-Cities.

Viewers in these markets could watch a simulcast of WGN-TV's broadcast of the telethon nationally on its WGN America superstation feed (which included the local telethon segments featuring WGN-TV personalities) or the telethon's broadcast on a television station in a neighboring market, as well as online from MDA's site. In some areas, satellite television and the internet were the only ways to view the telethon, as WGN America is not seen in all areas, and many cable systems carry only stations within their own market.

All ABC affiliates carried the telethon beginning in 2013. Since the telethon was available in all markets with an ABC affiliate, the number of markets where the broadcast was not available was greatly reduced. The WGN America simulcast was discontinued because WGN-TV, then a CW affiliate, was no longer broadcasting the show. It previously had been pre-empting the later hours of the telethon for Chicago Cubs games.

=== Station changes with new formats ===
While the new telethon format in 2011 was designed to attract new stations and markets into the Love Network fold, the MDA still found itself dropping some stations, resulting in a net shrinkage of the network to just over 150 stations – its smallest size since 1973. In May 2011, the MDA dropped WABI-TV in Bangor, Maine from the Love Network after 30 years, citing potential economic costs resulting from the new format. The move left WGME-TV in Portland as the only Love Network affiliate for the state of Maine, which is not available on Time Warner Cable in most parts of the Bangor market. In addition to Bangor, stations in Mobile, Alabama; Pensacola, Florida; Santa Barbara, California; Panama City, Florida; Savannah, Georgia; Terre Haute, Indiana; Alpena and Traverse City, Michigan; Austin, Minnesota; Cape Girardeau, Missouri; Paducah, Kentucky; Utica, New York; San Angelo, Texas; Bluefield, Clarksburg and Wheeling, West Virginia; Cheyenne, Wyoming; and the entire states of Mississippi, North Dakota, and Vermont were also dropped from the Love Network fold, with no replacement. This is in addition to markets that did not carry the telethon in 2010; no stations were added in any of these markets in 2011.

The new format had also led to the telethon being moved to other stations due to scheduling conflicts – longtime Love Network station KXAS-TV in Dallas–Fort Worth, Texas, announced that it would no longer carry the telethon, due to the station being an NBC owned-and-operated station, and the fact that the telethon would be pre-empting NBC's Sunday night schedule (which was otherwise in reruns that year). Independent station KTXA picked up the telethon and used personalities from CBS-owned sister station KTVT for local segments.

Other new Love Network affiliate changes included WITI replacing WDJT-TV in Milwaukee (thus returning to the station that had originally aired the event); WNCF replacing WAKA in Montgomery, Alabama; KOCB replacing KWTV-DT in Oklahoma City; KICU-TV replacing sister station KTVU in San Francisco; KZJO replacing sister station KCPQ in Seattle, Washington; KXMN-LP replacing KSKN in Spokane, Washington; WNYF-CD replacing WWNY-TV in Watertown, New York; and KXXV replacing KWTX-TV in Waco, Texas (KBTX-TV in Bryan, however, still carried the telethon until it moved to KRHD-CD in 2013 as a result of the telethon's move to ABC).

For the 2012 Show of Strength, the MDA dropped KODE-TV in Joplin, Missouri from the Love Network in May, stating that the market was too small for the event (KODE-TV would air the 2013 telethon as part of the broadcast's move to a network-televised broadcast on ABC). In nearby Springfield, Missouri, KSPR broadcast the show after years of telethon coverage by KOLR. In addition, KTLA in Los Angeles replaced KCAL-TV. Meanwhile, in Seattle, KCPQ returned to the Love Network fold, replacing sister station KZJO, after that station carried the 2011 telethon.

== Theme songs ==
- From the show's inception until the 2012 edition, its opening theme was "Smile", a song from Charlie Chaplin's 1936 film, Modern Times.
- The telethon's toteboard theme song was an instrumental version of Burt Bacharach's "What the World Needs Now Is Love" (1965). It was used from 1970 to 1989 in different arrangements. At the show's 25th anniversary in 1990, it was not used, but returned for the 1991 edition. In 1992, the song was replaced by various orchestral fanfares to give the show a fresh effect, but it returned in 1996 at Lewis's request. The 2008 and 2009 versions used the song only for the final tote while a generic fanfare marked the others; the 2010 edition used a generic fanfare for all totes, including the final tote, with "What The World Needs Now Is Love" relegated to a medley of songs that played during the closing credits.
- The song Jerry Lewis perennially sang to conclude the event, "You'll Never Walk Alone", was originally written for the 1945 Broadway musical play, Carousel by Rodgers and Hammerstein. Lewis has given conflicting accounts on the air as to the origin of his use of the song. According to his account at the end of the 2007 telethon, the song was suggested to him in 1964 by a disabled child who walked with a cane; it was suggested to Jerry as a song that would specifically represent physically disabled children. In the 2010 broadcast, however, Lewis mentioned that he knew the song by heart, and was singing it that year for the "59th time", which would mean he had been singing it annually since he began hosting MDA telethons in 1952. Also, a recording of Lewis singing the song for a poster child was released as a cardboard record in 1959; that year, Rodgers and Hammerstein gave the MDA permission to use the song as the official theme for the organisation. When Lewis was removed as telethon host in 2011, the song was retired.
- Between 2011 and the final telethon in 2014, there was a different song used each year to close the show.

== Canada ==
From the 1970s until the early 2000s, there were also Canadian "Love Network" affiliates, whose telethon presentations benefited the Muscular Dystrophy Association of Canada (MDC), an organization unrelated to the American MDA, but which used Lewis's U.S. telethon for fundraising. The telethon also helped launch a new station – in Winnipeg, CKND-TV's first program on August 31, 1975 was the MDA telethon. The telethon was also the last program for the station that CKND-TV replaced: KCND-TV in Pembina, North Dakota, which simulcast CKND's coverage.

From 1977 until 1993, the telethon was carried by the Global Television Network in Ontario with Mike Darow as host. Global's broadcast had longer local cutaways than on the US broadcast in order to feature Canadian performers. In 1994, the telethon moved to cable channel YTV and was broadcast nationally with Kurt Browning as host. Other notable "Love Network" affiliates included CBMT in Montreal, CFAC in Calgary, CKVU in Vancouver, CITV in Edmonton and ATV in Nova Scotia, New Brunswick and Prince Edward Island.

The final Canadian-based local broadcasts of the telethon aired from Ottawa in 2001 on area community television channels. After this, MDC officials cancelled the local broadcasts, claiming the move was done in order to save costs. The Ottawa broadcasts were first hosted by CFRA radio's Ken Grant, who expressed concern that there would be fewer donations due to the loss of local broadcast features. Ottawa's telethon broadcasts were conducted for 31 years, most of which originated from the Skyline Hotel (later known as the Citadel Inn).

After the Ottawa edition ended in 2001, no Canadian station or network aired the telethon since then, though it was available on cable and satellite from WGN-TV (through the superstation feed until 2007, then from the station's Chicago area signal thereafter), as well as from border U.S. stations (such as WMYD in Detroit/Windsor and WGRZ in Buffalo, whose signals are carried on many cable systems in Ontario). This continued to be the case after the telethon's move to ABC, with the program seen on ABC stations in cities near the Canada–U.S. border that are available over-the-air and on cable and satellite (such as WKBW-TV in Buffalo, New York, KOMO-TV in Seattle and WXYZ-TV in Detroit), the broadcast aired free from simultaneous substitution, as no Canadian station or network carried it.

As of 2011, Muscular Dystrophy Canada continued to operate pledge call centers during the telethon to collect Canadian donations.

Through 2010, the corporate donation segments of the telethon occasionally mentioned their Canadian donors, and WGN's telethon included a number for Canadians to call to make a pledge, 1-800-567-CURE, which connects to the pledge center in Toronto. In 2010, WGN's telecast also included a texting address for Canadian viewers to text in their pledges to MDC for an automatic $10 donation, aside from texting charges; this coincided with the MDA's launch of their own text-to-pledge service. Most border stations would also show either the local pledge number for the Canadian portion of their viewing area (as WMYD did), or the national Canadian number.

When the MDA reformatted the telethon in 2011, it no longer allowed its border Love Network affiliates to display any pledge numbers for Canadian viewers. However, the MDC still had a pledge line open, but only on Labour Day itself, with the MDC relying on other ways to get the message out.

A French-language telethon for MDA Canada was televised in Quebec concurrently with the American show in the late-1980s on the Radio-Québec network (now Télé-Québec); first televised in 1987, this telethon was hosted by entertainer Michel Louvain.

== Puerto Rico ==
In Puerto Rico, WKAQ-TV presents their own local telethon for MDA, Sentimiento Telemaratón, generally broadcast the first or second Sunday after Labor Day, usually from 11 a.m. to 8 p.m. Atlantic Time. As with the English version, the telethon features local and international celebrities, plus information on the organisation, the diseases and the people that rely on MDA's help. Despite the changes in the English-language version, WKAQ will continue the long-form format of their version of the telethon. While WKAQ does not show the Labor Day telethon, it was considered by the MDA as part of the Love Network.

== Hurricanes and other shortfalls ==
Telethon tote board pledges for 2004 were down nearly 2%, to $59,398,915 (from $60,505,234 in 2003). Hurricane Frances had struck through most of the Florida peninsula late on September 5, during the telethon, significantly reducing pledges from the southeast United States. As many Florida stations devoted their air-time to coverage of Hurricane Frances, most Love Network stations in Florida cancelled the local segments of the telethon and either aired only parts of the telethon, moved the telethon to a digital subchannel, or did not broadcast the telethon at all. On a Saturday afternoon in early December 2004, some Florida Love Network stations showed a special three-hour telethon, as a way to recoup some of the lost pledges. Telethon pledges were down another 7.5%, to $54,921,586 in 2005 due to significant Hurricane Katrina disaster relief efforts in New Orleans and throughout the region in 2005. That year, Jerry and his guests urged telethon viewers to also give donations to The Salvation Army and the American Red Cross.

The MDA itself donated $1 million to the Salvation Army for hurricane relief efforts. Prior to the hurricane-affected results of 2004 and 2005, the only other time the telethon raised less than the previous year was in 1982 ($28,400,000), during the recession of the early 1980s. One source said, however, that it was due to Jerry sitting out most of the telethon, due to his heart attack earlier (even though the heart attack did not occur until December of that year). However the next year – 1983, the telethon succeeded again in raising more money than its previous year and by 1984 was back to its record breaking pace. In 2006, the final tote board tally was $61,013,855 as five major regional stations knocked out during the previous telecast came back online. It was the first time since 2003 that the telethon raised more money than the previous year. In 2007, the telethon again raised more than any previous year, closing the show with tote board pledges totaling $63,759,478.

On Labor Day in 2008 (September 1), Hurricane Gustav struck the coast of Louisiana. Some Love Network affiliates in the affected area cancelled the telethon for safety and informational purposes. Meanwhile, in New Orleans, the local telethon segments on WNOL-TV were also postponed, with WGNO, the local producer (as well as WNOL's sister station) urging those wanting to give to do so through "the national telethon". Nationally, Jerry Lewis mentioned Hurricane Gustav and wished those in the affected area, especially his "kids", luck.

Neither he nor his guests made pleas for donations to The Salvation Army, contrary to a press release that said he would, although guest host Tom Bergeron did make a plea for donations to the Salvation Army during his hosting stint on the morning of September 1, as Gustav made landfall. However, with less than 10 minutes remaining in the 2008 telethon, the tote board update reflected an increase from the 2007 total, racking up $65,031,393 in donations, exceeding 2007's tote. Lewis had spoken about his concern at not making his goal of "one dollar more" due to economic conditions and Hurricane Gustav. When the tote board updated to show they'd gotten over 2007's total, he screamed three times, "I got it!" On Labor Day 2009 (September 7, 2009), the telethon only raised $60,481,231 in pledges, more than 2005, but lower than the final 2003 results. Lewis mentioned that the effects of the downfall of the American economy may have played a role in that year's shortfall, but was still amazed by the amount amassed nevertheless. In addition, no hurricanes threatened the United States around Labor Day weekend that year.

The 2010 telethon saw a further reduction by several million dollars. The final tote was $58,919,838. Lewis noted, "I'm heartened by the unique ability of Americans to help others in need, when they themselves are likely struggling financially."

== Tote board ==
- The telethon's tote boards varied from year to year; in the 1970s it was operated on a Solari-board, consisting of seven (later eight) number flippers using a white background and black numbers. Instead of using blank numbers, all flippers began with zeros. This tote board was discontinued after 1989 and replaced with a new tote board, first operated with the "eggcrate" display common on game shows, then later to an LCD-type "vane" display. By 2003, the tote board was changed to a screen display. The 2011 edition was the first not to use a tote board at all during the national segments, due to the show airing live only on most stations in Eastern Time, and on a tape delay in other time zones and on some Eastern Time stations.
- Elgin Watches was the sponsor of the telethon's toteboard as the "Official Timekeeper of the Telethon" in the late 1960s and early 1970s, at least during the telethon's New York years. From the mid-1970s to the early-1980s, Helbros was the toteboard sponsor. Since the early-1980s, the tote board had no dedicated sponsor, though some local stations continued to have a sponsor for their local tote boards.
- Figures are from the final tote board number at the end of each telethon. For years 1967 on, increase or decrease is given compared to the previous year and to the previous record. As of 2011, the telethon has broken its previous record every year except for 1982, 1983, 2004, 2005, 2009, 2010 and 2011; 1983 and 2011's telethons improved over the previous year's totals without breaking the all-time record.
- Through 2010, the final totes did not take into account any pledges that are made after the final tote is announced live – many stations would continue with their local segments afterward, with some stations delaying the final national tote until the very end of the telethon; some stations would also keep the pledge lines open for a short period of time after the telethon ended and the station resumed regular programming, thus making the final local totes inaccurate as well. As the 2011 telethon was not live outside of Eastern Time and could not keep a running national tote during the show, the final national tote for that year was not announced until the following day.
- The publicly stated total counts only pledges and does not indicate the actual amount donated, which is published on the MDA's Form 990. In 2009, the telethon drew approximately $45,000,000 (three-fourths) of its pledges; in 2010, $48,000,000 (nearly five-sixths). However, despite publicly stating a higher pledge total for the short telethon in 2011, the actual amount raised by the telethon was much smaller, with only $30,683,816 – slightly less than half – of the publicly stated total coming in, a steep drop-off from the last years under Lewis's stewardship.
- No obvious tote boards were used in the 2011 and 2012 telethons, although the 2011 edition announced a total after the special had aired. Those totals, however, included corporate sponsorships that had never been included in the tote board totals. That allowed MDA to claim the new format collected more than the old. Donations via phone, text and MDA's web site were urged by local network affiliates. In the final two telethons, viewers had visited MDA's website to view the online tote board.

MDA Telethon Final Tote Board Numbers
Year	Amount	Change	From Record	Venue	Notes	Source
1959	$575,208					
1966	$1,002,114			Americana Hotel, New York	Lewis's first telethon as host, Johnny Olson's first telethon as announcer and first telethon on Labor Day	
1967	$1,126,846	+12.45%	+12.45%	Americana Hotel, New York		
1968	$1,401,876	+24.41%	+24.41%	Americana Hotel, New York	Ed McMahon's first involvement with the telethon, first year of the Love Network	
1969	$2,039,139	+45.46%	+45.46%	Americana Hotel, New York		
1970	$5,093,385	+149.78%	+149.78%	Americana Hotel, New York	First coast-to-coast for the Love Network as it enters Los Angeles and San Francisco;	
1971	$8,125,387	+59.53%	+59.53%	Americana Hotel, New York		
1972	$9,200,754	+13.23%	+13.23%	Americana Hotel, New York	Johnny Olson's last telethon as announcer, final national telethon to be headquartered in New York City (NYC would remain a major market for the show and air remote guest performances during national segments until Lewis's last telethon in 2010.)	
1973	$12,395,973	+34.73%	+34.73%	Sahara Hotel, Las Vegas	first telethon to originate from Las Vegas, McMahon's first telethon as co-host and announcer	
1974	$16,129,213	+30.12%	+30.12%	Sahara Hotel, Las Vegas		
1975	$18,868,499	+16.98%	+16.98%	Sahara Hotel, Las Vegas		
1976	$21,723,813	+15.13%	+15.13%	Sahara Hotel, Las Vegas	Lewis reunites with comedy partner Dean Martin after 20 years since their 1956 break-up	
1977	$26,841,490	+23.56%	+23.56%	Sahara Hotel, Las Vegas		
1978	$29,074,405	+8.32%	+8.32%	Sahara Hotel, Las Vegas		
1979	$30,075,227	+5.56%	+5.56%	Sahara Hotel, Las Vegas		
1980	$31,103,787	+1.34%	+1.34%	Sahara Hotel, Las Vegas	actors' strike	
1981	$31,498,772	+1.27%	+1.27%	Sahara Hotel, Las Vegas		
1982	$28,415,339	−9.79%	−9.79%	Caesar's Palace, Las Vegas	titled "Jerry Lewis Extra Special Special", economic recession	
1983	$30,691,627	+8.01%	−2.56%	Caesar's Palace, Las Vegas	titled "Jerry Lewis Extra Special Special"	
1984	$32,074,566	+4.51%	+1.83%	Caesar's Palace, Las Vegas	titled "Jerry Lewis Extra Special Special", a.k.a. "THE Telethon"	
1985	$33,181,652	+3.45%	+3.45%	Caesar's Palace, Las Vegas	titled "Jerry Lewis Super Show"	
1986	$34,096,773	+2.76%	+2.76%	Caesar's Palace, Las Vegas		
1987	$39,021,723	+14.44%	+14.44%	Caesar's Palace, Las Vegas		
1988	$41,132,113	+5.41%	+5.41%	Caesar's Palace, Las Vegas		
1989	$42,737,219	+3.90%	+3.90%	Cashman Field Center, Las Vegas		
1990	$44,172,186	+3.36%	+3.36%	Aquarius Theater, Los Angeles	telethon moves to Los Angeles, its 25th anniversary, tribute to Sammy Davis Jr. (who died that year)	
1991	$45,071,857	+2.04%	+2.04%	Sahara Hotel, Las Vegas	return to Las Vegas	
1992	$45,759,368	+1.53%	+1.53%	Sahara Hotel, Las Vegas		
1993	$46,014,922	+0.56%	+0.56%	Sahara Hotel, Las Vegas		
1994	$47,105,396	+2.37%	+2.37%	Sahara Hotel, Las Vegas	titled "Jerry Lewis Stars Across America"	
1995	$47,827,221	+1.53%	+1.53%	CBS Television City, Los Angeles	titled "Jerry Lewis Stars Across America", return to Los Angeles	
1996	$49,146,555	+2.76%	+2.76%	CBS Television City, Los Angeles	titled "Jerry Lewis Stars Across America", tribute to Dean Martin (who died in 1995 and was Lewis's comedy partner from 1946 to 1956)	
1997	$50,475,055	+2.70%	+2.70%	CBS Television City, Los Angeles		
1998	$51,577,023	+2.18%	+2.18%	CBS Television City, Los Angeles	tribute to Frank Sinatra (who died that year), brother-sister duo Aubrey and Nicholas Olson of Pine City, Minnesota are National Goodwill Ambassadors	
1999	$53,116,417	+2.98%	+2.98%	CBS Television City, Los Angeles	Aubrey and Nicholas Olson return as National Goodwill Ambassadors	
2000	$54,610,289	+2.81%	+2.81%	CBS Television City, Los Angeles		
2001	$56,780,603	+3.97%	+3.97%	CBS Television City, Los Angeles		
2002	$58,276,118	+2.63%	+2.63%	CBS Television City, Los Angeles		
2003	$60,505,234	+3.83%	+3.83%	CBS Television City, Los Angeles		
2004	$59,398,915	−1.83%	−1.83%	CBS Television City, Los Angeles	Hurricane Frances, first telethon since 1982 not to make "$1 more"	
2005	$54,921,586	−7.54%	−9.23%	Beverly Hills Hilton, Los Angeles	Hurricane Katrina aftermath, first back-to-back year loss	
2006	$61,013,855	+11.09%	+0.84%	South Point Hotel and Casino, Las Vegas	return to Las Vegas	
2007	$63,759,478	+4.50%	+4.50%	South Point Hotel and Casino, Las Vegas		
2008	$65,031,393	+1.99%	+1.99%	South Point Hotel and Casino, Las Vegas	donation record, McMahon's last telethon as co-host and announcer	
2009	$60,481,231	−7.52%	−7.52%	South Point Hotel and Casino, Las Vegas	tribute to Ed McMahon (who died that year), economic recession, Shawn Parr's first telethon as announcer	
2010	$58,919,838	−2.58%	−9.40%	South Point Hotel and Casino, Las Vegas	final long-form telethon (21.5 hours), Lewis's last telethon as host	
2011	$61,491,393	+4.36%	−5.44%		first and only short-form telethon (6 hours), delayed broadcast by time zone, totals from that year onward include corporate donations, tribute to Jerry Lewis	
2012	$58,706,015	−4.53%	−9.73%		three-hour, largely pre-recorded benefit concert; last year of the Love Network	
2013	$59,583,555	+1.49%	−8.38%		first two-hour, pre-recorded benefit concert format, broadcast nationwide on a single television network (ABC)	
2014	$56,952,177	−4.42%	−12.42%		final telethon on broadcast television, last national telethon until 2020, Parr's last telethon as announcer	

== Documentaries ==
- The Kids Are All Right is a 2005 documentary about a former 1960s Jerry's Kid, Mike Ervin, who later became a disability rights activist critical of Lewis's and the MDA's tendency to paint people with disabilities as, "pitiable victims who want and need nothing more than a big charity to take care of or cure them."
- Telethon is a 2014 documentary about the preparation of the 1989 edition of the MDA Telethon in Las Vegas, consisting of found footage originally shot for a report for A Current Affair.

== Criticism ==
The New York Times wrote in 1992 that "some people with muscular dystrophy .. are criticizing (Lewis) for what they call his 'pity' approach.

The Jerry Lewis Telethon had one goal—to raise as much money possible for the Muscular Dystrophy Association, and to do this the telethon predominantly featured young children leading to the campaign slogan "Save Jerry’s Kids." In addition to the criticism of the use of disabled people as a fundraising tool, critics argue that focusing the public's attention on medical cures to "normalize" people with disabilities fails to address issues like providing accessible buildings, transportation, employment opportunities and other civil rights for people with disabilities. The picture that was painted with "Jerry’s Kids" pulled at the heartstrings of millions of viewers, and in return accomplished the goal of earning as much money as possible. One individual who was previously a "poster child" for Lewis explained that since two-thirds of people with MD are adults, yet the telethon solely promoted children, it did not fully represent the real lives of people who lived with MD.

A group named Jerry's Orphans, formed by former Jerry's Kid Mike Ervin, protested the telethon in 1991 and 1992 and criticized the small percentage of MDA's funding going to supporting people with muscular dystrophy, the use of pity by the telethon, and the lack of disabled representation in the MDA. They made a documentary about this in 2005.

Criticisms against Jerry Lewis himself revolved around Lewis valuing disabled children as "poster children," yet ignoring those same "poster children" as they grow up and need genuine help rather than pity. In Lewis's 1990 "If I Had Muscular Dystrophy" essay, published in Parade, Jerry Lewis imagines himself as an adult with MD. He writes, "I decided after 41 years of battling this curse that cripples children of all ages, that I would put myself into that chair, that steel imprisonment that has long been deemed the dystrophic child's plight." His statement "I realize my life is half, so I must learn to do things halfway. I just have to learn to try to be good at being half a person…" was rejected by some, like Chris Matthews, cofounder of "Jerry’s Orphans", who in 1992 rallied a group to protest that year’s telethon in 16 different cities.

Another criticism was that only 30% of the money MDA raises in a year comes from the telethon, which proves that they can feasibly provide help without objectifying the subjects of that help. Former poster child Cindy Jones said "No other symbols of disability play up pity more than charity telethons and their poster children."

Evan Kemp Jr., an adult with muscular dystrophy, claimed that "By arousing the public's fear of the handicap itself, the telethon makes viewers more afraid of handicapped people. Playing to pity may raise money, but it also raises walls of fear between the public and us." Kemp, a White House official, was accused by an MDA official who has had muscular dystrophy since age 8, of "making a 'vicious attack' on the association and 'misusing the power of his Government office' in attacking the charity."

=== Disability and commercialism ===
Professor Christopher Smit has argued that the MDA Telethon operated as present-day equivalent to the historical American freak shows which ran during the height of their popularity in the United States from 1840 to 1940.

- The physical staging of the individual: Historical American freak shows grabbed an audience's attention through their staging of physical abnormalities. While the historical freak show audience's perception of difference was easily garnered "due to the presence of an actual stage performance," it is claimed that the MDA telethon's ability to communicate those differences was dependent on how individuals were positioned in relation to each other while on camera.
- During telethons, MDA's spokesperson Jerry Lewis generated hilarity and, to some, exemplified probity; critics suggested he did so at the expense of the disabled, for whom he was raising money. Repeated use of telethon mantras such as "You can make a difference" and "Please send your donation now." were seen by some negatively.
- The written, personal narratives of the individual performers: An important item for spectators to collect were promotional visitor cards containing pictures and biographical information on freak show performers. Deliberately written as sensationalistic, thought-provoking narratives, these cards gave spectators added insight into the performer's lives while imbuing the entire process, from the point of view of the spectator, with a greater sense of shared intimacy. The content and conventions of the MDA telethon's personal story vignettes—often accompanied by sentimental music and words describing the lives of people with muscular dystrophy—opened wider avenues of shared intimacy for the home-viewer to experience. According to author Sheila Moeschen, these vignettes "invited spectators to voyeuristically experience life stories of the dystrophic," with their standardized narrative structures "constituting the telethon's affective core around which discourses of sympathy, pity, fear, or hope revolve(d)."

Smit backpedals, cautioning the importance of delineating differences between freak shows and the motivations of the MDA: "MDA distributes monies among patients in need of new wheelchairs and scientists working to cure MD itself. Put succinctly, the MDA event is charitable, while the traditional freak show is personal-profit oriented."

== Miscellaneous ==
- Don Francisco, the host of Sábado Gigante (1962–2015), is MDA's spokesperson on behalf of Hispanics with neuromuscular diseases – he generally appeared in the telethon in a pre-recorded message, appealing to Hispanics in Spanish to donate. Don Francisco is also known in his native Chile as host of that country's Teletón, for disabled children.
- Game show announcer Johnny Olson was the telethon's announcer for the first five years, from 1966 to 1970 before Ed McMahon took over the role in 1973, and held it until his death in 2009.
- 7 Up was the telethon's first corporate sponsor, in which they would raise money through special promotions and issue cheques in installments with multiple stage appearances used as advertising to Jerry during the course of the telethon. 7 Up was also the longest corporate sponsor (under current owner Dr Pepper Snapple Group), supporting the telethon since 1974.
- Prior to 1974, sponsorship was generally limited to trade unions and civic organizations – the most durable being the International Association of Fire Fighters, who supported the MDA since 1954, and appeared on the telethon since 1966.
- The National Association of Letter Carriers was another labor organization long-associated with the MDA, with the group naming the MDA as its "official charity" in 1952. The union's first nationally coordinated campaign to raise funds for MDA came during Thanksgiving week in 1953, when tens of thousands of letter carriers in more than 800 cities returned to their routes for a second time after completing their holiday-heavy mail deliveries. The all-volunteer effort was called "The Letter Carrier March for Muscular Dystrophy". In 1953, they raised $4 million.
- Another notable sponsor was 7-Eleven, who was a sponsor from 1976 to the early-2000s. Early on, Jerry Lewis would appear in commercials urging 7-Eleven shoppers to "Keep The Change" for his Kids. During the late-1970s and early-1980s, Lewis appeared in commercials for 7-Eleven, promoting its stores and products.
- In 1980, a strike by AFTRA and SAG prevented many guest stars from performing. Instead, they simply walked onstage, shook hands with Lewis, handed him a personal cheque, and encouraged viewers to make a donation.
- Jerry was also the host of the first edition of the French Téléthon in 1987, which benefits the muscular dystrophy charity in France, L'Association française contre les myopathies. Jerry also co-hosted the 1991 edition. The French MD telethon is generally televised at various intervals on the France Télévisions group of channels (France 2, France 3, France 4, France 5, France Ô and Outre-Mer 1ère) on the first weekend in December. The 2007 edition took in €96,228,136 (US$141,089,693) in pledges, down from its 2006 total of €101,472,581 (US$136,389,286). (The value in US dollars against Euros are as of the telethon's broadcast for that particular year.)
- Up through the Love Network's dissolution in 2013, of its charter affiliates, WHEC-TV and the present-day WGRZ and WLNE-TV carried the telethon through 2012. Among these original Love Network stations, only WLNE carried the 2013 and 2014 editions, as part of its ABC affiliation. WLNE's carriage was not continuous, however, as WPRI-TV carried the program for some years until WLNE picked up the telethon again in 1994.
  - What is now WLVI-TV (the former WKBG) dropped the event, which then moved to WCVB-TV, an ABC affiliate.
  - Today's WNYW (the former WNEW) dropped the telethon after 1986, which moved to WWOR-TV in 1987, carrying the telethon through 2012. Coincidentally, both WNYW and WWOR are now under the common ownership of the Fox Television Stations group.
