= Ozark, Illinois =

- Unincorporated community
- Location within Illinois Location within the United States
- Coordinates: 37°32′33″N 88°45′46″W
- Country: United States
- State: Illinois
- County: Johnson
- Elevation: 689 ft (210 m)
- Time zone: UTC-6 (Central (CST))
  - Summer (DST): UTC-5 (CDT)
- ZIP code: 62972
- Area code: 618
- GNIS feature ID: 425295

Ozark is an unincorporated community in Johnson County, Illinois, United States. Ozark is south of New Burnside. and has a post office with ZIP code 62972. Ozark is also home to Camp Ondessonk, a Catholic youth camp that is run by the Diocese of Belleville.

== Notable person ==
- Carl Choisser (1895-1939), Illinois state representative, lawyer, and newspaper editor, was born in Ozark.
