= Small Town Big Deal =

American television newsmagazine

- Starring: Rodney K. Miller; Jann Carl
- Country of origin: United States
- No. of seasons: 7
- No. of episodes: 183

Production
- Executive producers: Roger Mahr; Rodney K. Miller
- Production companies: Georgia Film Music & Digital Entertainment; STBD Productions, Inc.

Original release
- Network: RFD-TV; Syndication
- Release: September 6, 2012 – present

Small Town Big Deal is an American television news magazine that runs in first-run syndication with a focus on human interest stories in rural America. The TV program is co-hosted by Rodney K. Miller and Jann Carl. Together, they travel the United States sharing inspirational stories about communities, people, events and happenings. The show first aired on September 6, 2012 on the RFD-TV network. In 2017, the show was being viewed on over 150 local stations and 80 percent of the country each week across America, including several of the ABC Owned Television Stations, which air the program in weekend morning graveyard slots, as well as low-power and digital 24-hour networks Youtoo America (which airs the show several times a week), AMGTV, Total Living Network, CTN Lifestyle and Heartland. Small Town Big Deal has received the Parents Television Council Seal of Approval.

== Episodes ==
Small Town Big Deal has aired nearly 100 episodes since September 2012 and broadcast from 150 local stations. Small Town Big Deal is viewed in more than 80 percent of U.S. markets as well as other outlets including Sky Angel TV, Pure Flix, and Comcast outlets in California. Overseas, the show is viewed on the Armed Forces Network (AFN).

A sample of the types of stories that Small Town Big Deal has covered includes:

"Mackinac Bridge and Tractor Crossing"

The hosts scale the heights of Michigan’s Mackinac Bridge, lead the world’s largest antique tractor parade across the bridge.

"A Famous Lake & Lumberjacks"

The hosts see how residents along the shores of Lake Geneva, Wisconsin receive their mail every summer by boat. This is followed by a visit to the Lumberjack World Championships.

"Silver Lakes Sand Dunes/Sanbol Lighthouse"

The hosts race high-powered four wheelers on sand dunes. Then Rodney climbs to the top of the Little Sabol Lighthouse on the coast of Lake Michigan.

"400 Mile Yard Sale"

The hosts travel across the length of Kentucky on Highway 68 for the annual 400 Mile Yard Sale.

"Totally Epic Tug-O-War"

The Mississippi River is the fourth-longest river in the world and important commerce corridor. For one day a year the Army Corps of Engineers with a Tug-of-War.

== Hosts ==
The series is co-hosted by Rodney K. Miller, an executive in the agricultural machinery industry, and Jann Carl, a longtime news personality who prior to joining this series had a 14-year run on the syndicated magazine Entertainment Tonight.
