= Sold! =

- Genre: Reality
- Starring: Rick Bryant; Jerry Brown; John Wright; Mike Hynes; John Buckingham
- Country of origin: United States
- Original language: English
- No. of seasons: 1
- No. of episodes: 10

Production
- Executive producers: Bonnie Brennan; Carter Figueroa; Jann Carl; Julian P. Hobbs; Julie Harman
- Running time: 22 minutes
- Production company: Evident Entertainment

Original release
- Network: History
- Release: April 11 – May 23, 2012

Sold! is an American reality television series on History that premiered on April 11, 2012. The series chronicles the activities of Rick Bryant, owner of Bryant Auction, and his team located in Missouri. Each episode details the process of auctioning, showing the appraisal, acquisition and eventual auctioning of the items.

== Episodes ==
No.	Title	Original release date
1	"Rick's Royal Flush"	April 11, 2012
2	"Welcome to the Gun Show"	April 11, 2012
3	"Duck and Hover"	April 18, 2012
4	"Dukes of Auction"	April 18, 2012
5	"Dressed to Grill"	April 25, 2012
6	"Fire Sale"	April 25, 2012
7	"Down and Dirty"	May 2, 2012
8	"Printing Money"	May 9, 2012
9	"Saved by the Saddle"	May 16, 2012
10	"Moonwalkin'"	May 23, 2012
