= West Frankfort, Illinois =

West Frankfort "Frankfort Heights", “The Heights”
- City
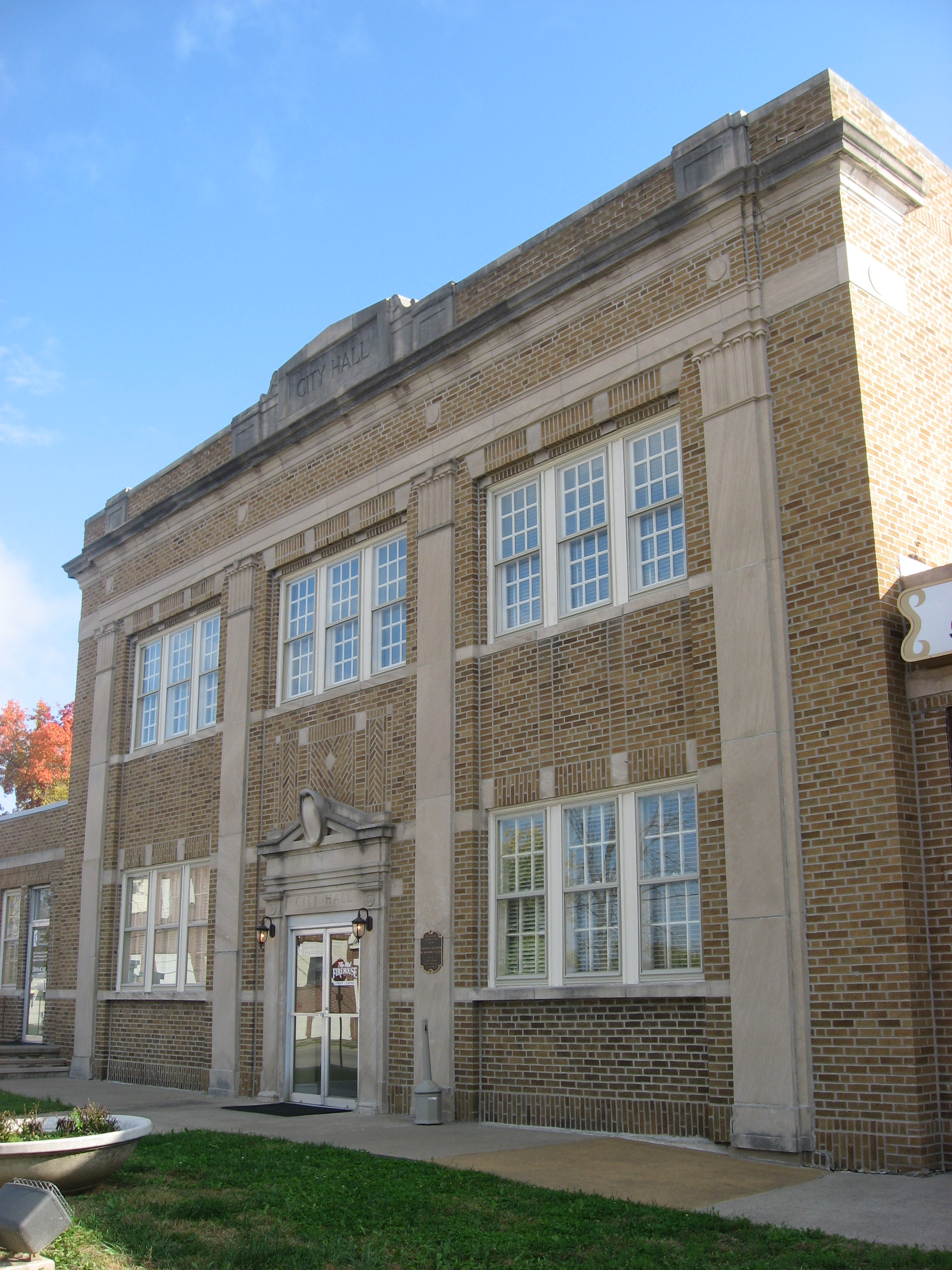
- Old City Hall
- Motto: A Rich Past, A Bright Future
- Location of West Frankfort in Franklin County, Illinois.
- Coordinates: 37°53′25″N 88°55′55″W
- Country: United States
- State: Illinois
- County: Franklin
- Township: Denning, Frankfort
- Founded: 1810
- City Charter: 1906

Area
  - Total: 5.02 sq mi (12.99 km^{2})
  - Land: 4.98 sq mi (12.90 km^{2})
  - Water: 0.039 sq mi (0.10 km^{2})
- Elevation: 400 ft (120 m)

Population (2020)
  - Total: 7,275
  - Density: 1,460.9/sq mi (564.05/km^{2})
- Time zone: UTC-6 (CST)
  - Summer (DST): UTC-5 (CDT)
- ZIP code: 62896
- Area code: 618
- FIPS code: 17-80333
- GNIS feature ID: 2397267
- Website: www.westfrankfort-il.com

West Frankfort is a city in Franklin County, Illinois. The population was 7,275 at the 2020 census. The city is well known for its rich history of coal. The city is part of the Metro Lakeland area.

== History ==
Although one might associate the name "West Frankfort" with the city "Frankfurt" in Germany, or Frankfort in Kentucky, the truth is far more local. Around 1810, early Tennessee settler Francis ("Frank") Jordan and his seven brothers began the construction of a fort atop a hill in present-day Franklin County. Completed in 1811, the fort was named "Frank's Fort," in Jordan's honor.

Frank's Fort was built in today's Williamson County, Ill., near Corinth. A few miles to the east, Francis' brother, Thomas Jordan, built "Jordan's Fort" in Cave Township, Franklin County, Ill., near the town of Thompsonville.

The construction of these forts was in response to the danger of attack during Tecumseh's War, which culminated in the Battle of Tippecanoe in 1811. Then-governor of the Illinois Territory, Ninian Edwards, actively encouraged the construction of these forts and offered the services of the Saline Militia in their erection. Thus, both Jordan family forts were built with the help of the Illinois Militia for the safety of the civilians.

Since the Shawnee Trail, an important trading route linking Kaskaskia, Illinois and Old Shawneetown, Illinois, ran along the high ground in the vicinity of the fort, this area became an attractive destination for settlers in search of cheap land made available by the recently passed Bit Act of 1850. The resulting settlement took the name of the nearby fort, which was subsequently shortened to "Frankfort." Frankfort grew quickly during this period, with its population rivaling that of Chicago, at the time.

Frankfort was Franklin County's first county seat until 1839, when the lower half of the county was declared as Williamson County.

After railroad tracks linking Chicago, Paducah, and Memphis, were laid 4 miles (6 km) west of Frankfort, many businesses and residents migrated to the new commercial center forming near the tracks. This new community became known as West Frankfort, for its location to the west of Frankfort. The two cities eventually merged and retained the name West Frankfort.

The area of West Frankfort formerly known as Frankfort is still sometimes referred to locally as Frankfort Heights or, more commonly, simply as "The Heights", due to its higher elevation relative to the rest of the city. A post office was maintained in Frankfort Heights until its destruction by fire in 2004, making West Frankfort one of the smallest cities in the United States to have two ZIP codes (the other zip code is designated as "Frankfort Heights, Illinois").

=== Tri-State Tornado of 1925 ===
West Frankfort was one of many communities hit by the 1925 Tri-State Tornado. 148 lives were lost and over 500 homes were leveled.

=== 1929 coal mine explosion ===
On December 1, 1929, an explosion at the Old Ben Coal Company's No. 8 Mine killed 7 people.

=== 1947 coal mine explosion ===
The Old Ben No. 8 Mine exploded again on July 24, 1947, killing 27 people.

=== West Frankfort Cardinals ===
The West Frankfort Cardinals were a minor-league baseball team from 1947 to 1950, serving as a Class D affiliate of the St. Louis Cardinals.

=== 1951 coal mine explosion ===
The Orient No. 2 coal mine exploded on December 21, 1951, killing 119 men. The mine, located outside of West Frankfort, was one of the area's major employers. According to lifelong residents, everyone in West Frankfort was affected by this tragedy, including grade schoolers of the time who remember their own losses or the suffering of classmates. Many residents had even said they could never celebrate Christmas again. After the catastrophe, the West Frankfort Junior High School became a temporary morgue for identification of the bodies.

=== Eclipse crossroads of America ===
The area was in totality during the solar eclipse of August 21, 2017, with Giant City State Park, approximately 25 miles (40 km) to the southwest, experiencing the longest period of totality during the eclipse (approximately 2 minutes and 40 seconds).

== Geography ==
According to the 2021 census gazetteer files, West Frankfort has a total area of 5.02 square miles (13.00 km^{2}), of which 4.98 square miles (12.90 km^{2}) (or 99.26%) is land and 0.04 square miles (0.10 km^{2}) (or 0.74%) is water.

== Demographics ==
Historical population
Census	Pop.	Note	%±
1910	2,111		—
1920	8,478		301.6%
1930	14,683		73.2%
1940	12,383		−15.7%
1950	11,384		−8.1%
1960	9,027		−20.7%
1970	8,854		−1.9%
1980	9,437		6.6%
1990	8,526		−9.7%
2000	8,196		−3.9%
2010	8,182		−0.2%
2020	7,275		−11.1%
U.S. Decennial Census

=== 2020 census ===
As of the 2020 census, West Frankfort had a population of 7,275. There were 3,198 households and 1,950 families residing in the city.

The median age was 41.1 years. 22.1% of residents were under the age of 18 and 19.5% of residents were 65 years of age or older. For every 100 females there were 93.8 males, and for every 100 females age 18 and over there were 90.4 males age 18 and over.

98.7% of residents lived in urban areas, while 1.3% lived in rural areas.

Of all households, 28.4% had children under the age of 18 living in them. 34.8% were married-couple households, 22.6% were households with a male householder and no spouse or partner present, and 33.8% were households with a female householder and no spouse or partner present. About 37.1% of all households were made up of individuals and 16.7% had someone living alone who was 65 years of age or older.

There were 3,766 housing units, of which 15.1% were vacant. The homeowner vacancy rate was 5.0% and the rental vacancy rate was 14.2%.

Racial composition as of the 2020 census
Race	Number	Percent
White	6,737	92.6%
Black or African American	49	0.7%
American Indian and Alaska Native	28	0.4%
Asian	38	0.5%
Native Hawaiian and Other Pacific Islander	3	0.0%
Some other race	34	0.5%
Two or more races	386	5.3%
Hispanic or Latino (of any race)	154	2.1%

== Notable people ==
- Clyde L. Choate, politician, World War II Medal of Honor recipient
- William A. Denning, Illinois Supreme Court justice and state representative
- Kenneth J. Gray, politician, World War II Victory Medal recipient
- Tim Lee Hall, politician
- Max Morris, athlete, played in both the NBA and AAFC
- Hal Smith, member of the 1960 Pittsburgh Pirates season
- Joe Wendryhoski, athlete, former NFL lineman

== Events, media, and recognition ==
West Frankfort is also home to Candy Cane Lane, a large lights display featured every year around Christmas. The display involves several blocks of homes, including a large display by a local art teacher. In 2019, areas of Candy Cane Lane were featured on the ABC show The Great Christmas Light Fight.
