= Sesser, Illinois =

Sesser
- City
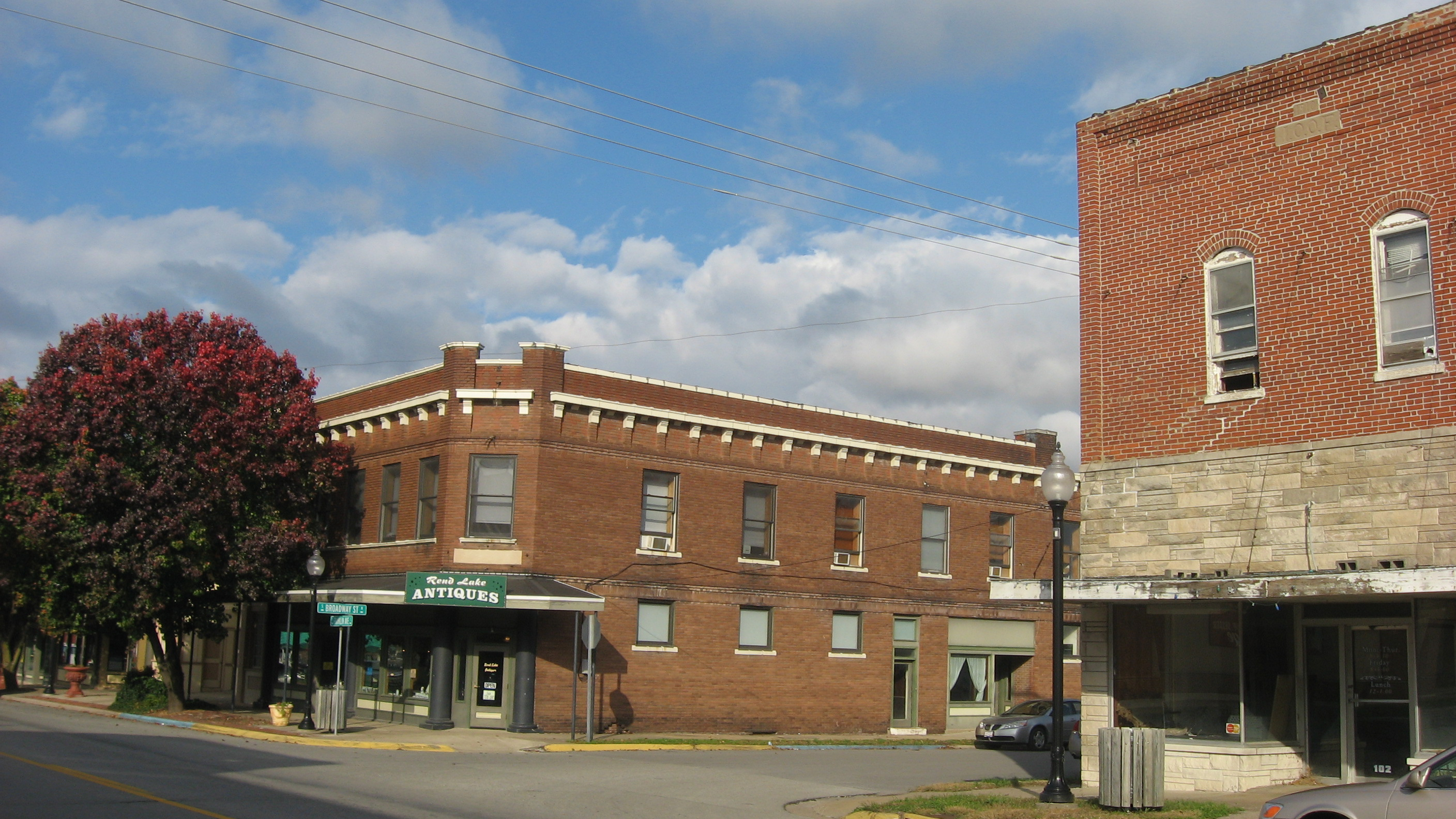
- Downtown Sesser

- Location of Sesser in Franklin County, Illinois.
- Coordinates: 38°05′26″N 89°03′04″W
- Country: United States
- State: Illinois
- County: Franklin

Area
  - Total: 1.03 sq mi (2.67 km^{2})
  - Land: 1.03 sq mi (2.67 km^{2})
  - Water: 0 sq mi (0.00 km^{2})
- Elevation: 479 ft (146 m)

Population (2020)
  - Total: 1,888
  - Density: 1,832.6/sq mi (707.56/km^{2})
- Time zone: UTC-6 (CST)
  - Summer (DST): UTC-5 (CDT)
- ZIP code: 62884
- Area code: 618
- FIPS code: 17-68705
- GNIS feature ID: 2396576
- Website: http://www.sesser.org

Sesser is a city in Franklin County, Illinois, United States. The population was 1,888 at the 2020 census. The current mayor is C. Jason Ashmore.

== History ==
In summer 1904, when coal was discovered at today's Sesser, the area was a prairie covered with wheat and corn fields. By 1906, the Chicago, Burlington and Quincy Railroad had extended its lines south from Centralia to Sesser, and the new town was named after railroad surveyor John Sesser.

The first mine in Sesser, the Keller Mine, was sunk in 1905–1906.

In 1906, Sesser was incorporated as a village. It re-incorporated as a city in 1909.

Old Ben Coal Mine No. 16, also called Sesser Mine, operated from 1905 to 1923.

Subsidence resulting from longwall mining at the Old Ben No. 21 mine, by Old Ben Coal Company, was a concern for some local homeowners in the 1980s. The No. 21 mine, opened in 1952, was idled in 1991.

The Sesser Opera House, built in 1914, is listed on the National Register of Historic Places.

== Geography ==
According to the 2021 census gazetteer files, Sesser has a total area of 1.03 square miles (2.67 km^{2}), of which 1.03 square miles (2.67 km^{2}) (or 99.90%) is land and 0.00 square miles (0.00 km^{2}) (or 0.10%) is water.

== Demographics ==
Historical population
Census	Pop.	Note	%±
1910	1,292		—
1920	2,841		119.9%
1930	2,315		−18.5%
1940	2,117		−8.6%
1950	2,086		−1.5%
1960	1,764		−15.4%
1970	2,125		20.5%
1980	2,238		5.3%
1990	2,087		−6.7%
2000	2,128		2.0%
2010	1,931		−9.3%
2020	1,888		−2.2%
U.S. Decennial Census

=== 2020 census ===
As of the 2020 census, there were 1,888 people, 845 households, and 485 families residing in the city. The population density was 1,831.23 inhabitants per square mile (707.04/km^{2}), and there were 932 housing units at an average density of 903.98 per square mile (349.03/km^{2}).

The median age was 44.1 years. 21.7% of residents were under the age of 18 and 21.4% were 65 years of age or older. For every 100 females, there were 95.6 males, and for every 100 females age 18 and over there were 93.6 males. 0.0% of residents lived in urban areas, while 100.0% lived in rural areas.

Of the 845 households, 26.4% had children under the age of 18 living in them. Of all households, 42.7% were married-couple households, 21.9% had a male householder with no spouse or partner present, and 29.5% had a female householder with no spouse or partner present. About 36.5% of all households were made up of individuals, and 18.8% had someone living alone who was 65 years of age or older.

Of the 932 housing units, 9.3% were vacant. The homeowner vacancy rate was 3.0% and the rental vacancy rate was 4.6%.

Racial composition as of the 2020 census
Race	Number	Percent
White	1,767	93.6%
Black or African American	6	0.3%
American Indian and Alaska Native	2	0.1%
Asian	0	0.0%
Native Hawaiian and Other Pacific Islander	0	0.0%
Some other race	15	0.8%
Two or more races	98	5.2%
Hispanic or Latino (of any race)	49	2.6%

=== Income and poverty ===
The median income for a household in the city was $54,375, and the median income for a family was $66,875. Males had a median income of $42,917 versus $32,875 for females. The per capita income for the city was $24,785. About 4.7% of families and 5.8% of the population were below the poverty line, including 6.9% of those under age 18 and 6.8% of those age 65 or over.
