= Benton, Illinois =

- City
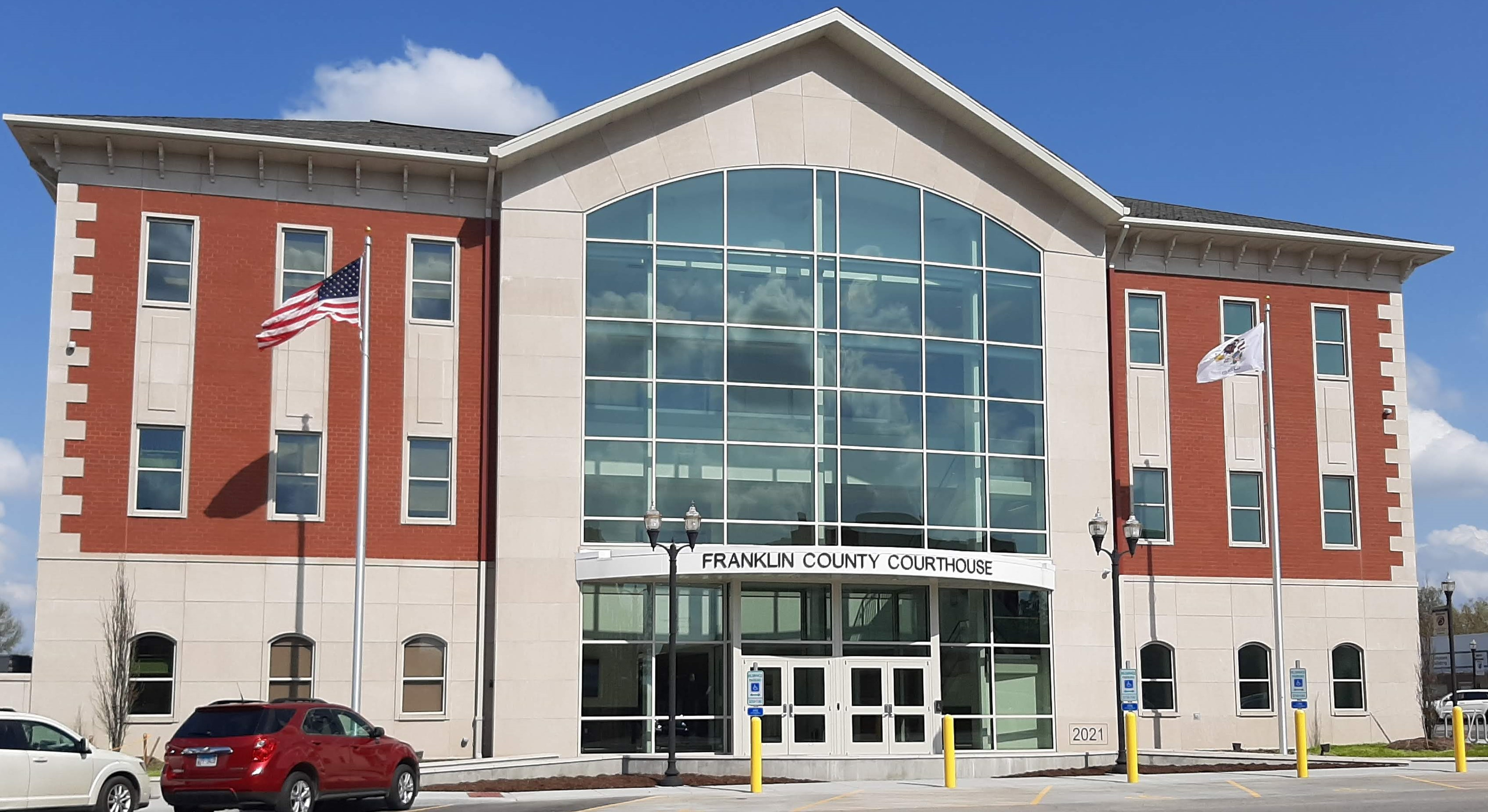
- Franklin County Courthouse
- Interactive map of Benton, Illinois
- Location within Illinois Location within the United States
- Coordinates: 38°00′18″N 88°55′03″W
- Country: United States
- State: Illinois
- County: Franklin
- Named for: Thomas Hart Benton

Government
  - Type: Mayor-council government

Area
  - Total: 5.66 sq mi (14.66 km^{2})
  - Land: 5.48 sq mi (14.19 km^{2})
  - Water: 0.18 sq mi (0.46 km^{2})
- Elevation: 446 ft (136 m)

Population (2020)
  - Total: 6,709
  - Density: 1,224.32/sq mi (472.712/km^{2})
- Time zone: UTC−6 (CST)
  - Summer (DST): UTC−5 (CDT)
- ZIP Code: 62812
- Area code: 618
- FIPS code: 17-05300
- GNIS feature ID: 2394140
- Website: bentonil.com

Benton is a city in and the county seat of Franklin County, Illinois, United States. The population was 6,709 at the 2020 census. In 1839, Franklin County was split roughly in half and the county seat was permanently fixed "at a hill at the south end of Rowling's Prairie", the site of the future city of Benton. Benton's namesake is Missouri senator Thomas Hart Benton. The village of Benton was organized in 1841 on 20 acres (8.1 ha) of property donated by John Ewing and Walter S. Akin. In 1902, the village became a city, and incorporated under the mayor/commissioner form of government.

The Franklin County Courthouse sat in the center of the Public Square. It was the fourth courthouse that served the people of Franklin County. The Italianate building was constructed in 1874–75 for $27,500. Much of Benton's growth in the past was due to an abundance of high sulfur coal, multiple railroads that pass through the town, fertile soil, and its industry.

== History ==
On April 19, 1928, Benton was the site of the next-to-last public hanging in Illinois, when local gangster Charles Birger was executed on the gallows next to the county jail for the December 12, 1926 murder of Joe Adams, mayor of nearby West City. A replica of the gallows and hangman's noose were built by the late retired Old Ben Coal miner, businessman & carpenter, Birchard L. Wampler (March 9, 1938 – June 29, 2010) and his son Birchard Neil Wampler. They remain standing today next to the old Franklin County Jail turned Museum.

In September 1963, George Harrison of the Beatles visited Benton while on vacation, the first time any member of the group visited American soil. He stayed at the home of his sister, Louise, at 113 McCann Street. The bungalow used to be the Hard Day's Nite Bed and Breakfast. During his trip he traveled from Benton to Fenton's Music Store in Mt. Vernon, IL to purchase a Rickenbacker 425 that later sold at auction for $657k. Harrison also performed with a band called "The Four Vests" at the Veterans of Foreign Wars hall in Eldorado, Illinois. In an interview, Harrison's sister Louise said "his real first visit to America was when he came to the Midwest in September 1963 and he met these wonderful, warm, friendly, real warm Midwesterners ... school teachers, retired miners and all kinds of just wonderful people... and a little band. He had a fantastic time. He thought they were just wonderful people."

In April 1995, a Ku Klux Klan (KKK) rally was held outside the Franklin County Courthouse in Benton that drew a crowd of about 400, though not all those in attendance were in support of the KKK. Two members of the KKK spoke negatively of Jews, Blacks, Gays, liberal politicians, and reporters. About 40 police officers were present for the event, and some were wearing riot gear.

In August 2017, a 16-foot-tall (4.9 m) commemorative mural of George Harrison was created and donated by California artist John Cerney. Cerney caught word of Harrison's memorable visit to the town on a Sirius radio program, which inspired Cerney's creation. The "highway art" can be found facing southbound traffic along Interstate 57. The project was completed just in time for tourists to admire it as they traveled through the city for the total solar eclipse of 2017.

In June 2020, following the murder of George Floyd, a Black Lives Matter protest was held at the Franklin County Courthouse in Benton. At the time of the protest, the courthouse was being prepared for demolition. The protest attracted a crowd of about 60 people. The protest came 25 years after the KKK rally (mentioned above) was held in the same spot.

== Geography ==
=== Land and water area ===
According to the 2010 census, Benton has a total area of 5.66 square miles (14.66 km^{2}), of which 5.48 square miles (14.19 km^{2}) (or 96.81%) is land and 0.18 square miles (0.47 km^{2}) (or 3.18%) is water.

=== Benton Public Library ===
Benton Public Library serves all residents of Benton Consolidated High School District. www.bentonlibrary.com

The library has a program in which people can pay for brick to be engraved and used on its property, and the funds made go to the library.

The library contains about 48,000 materials, including Books, Audio books, Magazines, Large Print Materials, and Music CDs. Access to computers is also available at the library. It opened a reading garden behind the building which contains painted chairs made by the local high school and other donated play equipment, including a large handmade wooden ship.

=== Benton Public Park ===
The Benton Public Park has a few playgrounds, and picnic areas, as well as tennis courts, basketball courts, and ball fields. The Public Park also has a paved walking path that loops around the ball fields. The park is located near a railroad, and a red caboose sits at the entrance of the park.

== Demographics ==
Historical population
Census	Pop.	Note	%±
1860	380		—
1870	615		61.8%
1880	984		60.0%
1890	939		−4.6%
1900	1,341		42.8%
1910	2,675		99.5%
1920	7,201		169.2%
1930	8,219		14.1%
1940	7,372		−10.3%
1950	7,848		6.5%
1960	7,023		−10.5%
1970	6,833		−2.7%
1980	7,778		13.8%
1990	7,216		−7.2%
2000	6,880		−4.7%
2010	7,087		3.0%
2020	6,709		−5.3%
U.S. Decennial Census

=== 2020 census ===
As of the 2020 census, Benton had a population of 6,709. The median age was 41.6 years. 22.4% of residents were under the age of 18 and 22.6% of residents were 65 years of age or older. For every 100 females there were 92.9 males, and for every 100 females age 18 and over there were 87.0 males age 18 and over. The population density was 1,185.55 inhabitants per square mile (457.74/km^{2}). There were 1,575 families residing in the city.

96.4% of residents lived in urban areas, while 3.6% lived in rural areas.

There were 2,879 households in Benton, of which 27.0% had children under the age of 18 living in them. Of all households, 39.0% were married-couple households, 19.9% were households with a male householder and no spouse or partner present, and 32.8% were households with a female householder and no spouse or partner present. About 35.8% of all households were made up of individuals and 19.2% had someone living alone who was 65 years of age or older.

There were 3,360 housing units at an average density of 593.74 per square mile (229.24/km^{2}), of which 14.3% were vacant. The homeowner vacancy rate was 4.0% and the rental vacancy rate was 11.7%.

Racial composition as of the 2020 census
Race	Number	Percent
White	6,216	92.7%
Black or African American	35	0.5%
American Indian and Alaska Native	22	0.3%
Asian	36	0.5%
Native Hawaiian and Other Pacific Islander	0	0.0%
Some other race	52	0.8%
Two or more races	348	5.2%
Hispanic or Latino (of any race)	174	2.6%

=== Income and poverty ===
The median income for a household in the city was $44,795, and the median income for a family was $57,305. Males had a median income of $40,025 versus $32,923 for females. The per capita income for the city was $27,932. About 10.3% of families and 14.7% of the population were below the poverty line, including 10.4% of those under age 18 and 14.5% of those age 65 or over.

== Media ==
=== Newspapers ===
Benton and surrounding areas are served by two weekly local newspapers, The Benton News and The Benton Gazette. Other newspapers such as The Southern Illinoisan serve Benton and much wider areas surrounding it.

=== Television news ===
Benton does not have any news channels broadcast from the city. Many news channels still do serve the Benton, Illinois area. WSIL (channel 3), KFVS (channel 12), and Fox 23 (channel 23) are among the most popular channels that provide some local news for Benton.

=== Internet access ===
Benton has multiple internet service providers that provide broadband internet. There are seven total internet service providers available for residential usage. Six of the internet service providers can offer broadband speeds (download of 25 Mbit/s). Six offer speeds higher than 100 Mbit/s. The fastest internet service available is offered by Frontier at 5 Gbit/s (5000 Mbit/s). Five connection types are offered: DSL, cable, fixed wireless, satellite, and fiber-optic internet.

=== Luann & Sonja: Welcome to Crappie Lake ===
Benton was the location of the 2023 season of Bravo's Luann & Sonja: Welcome to Crappie Lake, in which Luann de Lesseps and Sonja Morgan spend five weeks in Benton, sprucing up the town.

== Notable people ==
- Charlie Birger, bootlegger during prohibition, hanged on 19 April 1928 at the Franklin County Jail in Benton
- Lin Bolen, former vice president of NBC
- Carl Choisser, Illinois state representative, lawyer, and newspaper editor
- Doug Collins, NBA coach, player, broadcaster, and Olympic basketball player
- William A. Denning, Illinois Supreme Court justice and state legislator
- Gary Forby, Illinois State senator
- Billy Grammer, Grand Ole Opry star
- Richard O. Hart, Illinois state representative and lawyer
- William L. Hungate, federal judge and congressman from Missouri
- John Malkovich, actor
- Shirley Marsh, Nebraska state senator
- Rodney K. Miller, television host for Small Town Big Deal
- Offa Neal, third baseman for the New York Giants
- Dave Nicholson Major League Baseball slugger/outfielder
- Ernest J. Odum, Illinois state representative and lawyer
- Carl Scarborough, race car driver, born in Benton
- Noble Threewitt, thoroughbred race horse trainer, born in Benton in 1911
- Herbert L. Upchurch, Illinois state legislator and educator
- Rich Yunkus, former basketball player
