= Robert L. Butler =

American lawyer

Mayor of Marion, Illinois
- In office May 6, 1963 – January 31, 2018
- Preceded by: Robert Cooksey
- Succeeded by: Anthony Rinella

Personal details
- Born: January 23, 1927 Marion, Illinois, U.S.
- Died: April 22, 2019 (aged 92) Marion, Illinois, U.S.
- Party: Republican
- Spouse: Louetta Sanders
- Relations: Homer M. Butler (father); Eva Butler (mother)
- Children: 1
- Education: University of Illinois (J.D.)

Robert Lee Butler (January 23, 1927 – April 22, 2019) was an American politician and lawyer who served as the mayor of Marion, Illinois from May 1963 until he resigned on January 31, 2018, for health reasons. At the time of his resignation, he was the second-longest-serving mayor in the United States.

== Background ==
His maternal grandfather. J. H. Clarida, served as mayor of Marion from 1923 to 1927 and, for a time, was the Police Chief. Butler's father, Homer M. Butler, served on the local school board and city commission, then spent 16 years in the state Legislature during the 1940s and '50s. Butler grew up in Marion and graduated from Marion High School, where he was the editor-in-chief for the school newspaper. As a youth he earned the rank of Eagle Scout in the local Boy Scout troop and served on summer camp staff in 1943 at what would later become Ferne Clyffe State Park. That summer he became a charter member of the Ney-A-Ti Lodge, the local chapter of the Order of the Arrow honor society in Scouting.

He was the son of Homer and Eva (Clarida) Butler. His father served six years on the Marion City Council starting in the 1930s. His maternal grandfather J. H. Clarida served as mayor of the city in the 1920s during the Bloody Williamson era.

He served for two years in the United States Army Counter Intelligence Corps following World War II in Japan and Korea. He graduated from the University of Illinois Law School in 1952.

Butler served as an assistant state's attorney in Williamson County under State's Attorney Carl Sneed from 1954 to his election as mayor. On April 12, 1960, he received one write-in vote for the Democratic nomination for state's attorney. His boss, also a Republican, won the Democratic primary with 45 write-ins.

Marion adopted a zoning ordinance in December 1958. The following month the city council created the Marion Planning Commission and named Butler as one of seven members. In July 1961, Butler outlined the commission's agenda as additional off-street parking, new water mains and extensions, shopping centers, the courthouse and fire protection. Butler called the location of the county courthouse in the center of the square "a detriment to the business community."

== Mayor of Marion, Illinois ==
=== 1963 election ===
During Butler's first race for mayor in 1963, he first had to get past a crowded 5-man primary that included the incumbent mayor Robert Cooksey, city commissioners A. R. Douglas and Bob Yearack, and former city commissioner Raymond McCormick. He was the second youngest candidate that year, at age 36. That wasn't the only crowded race, 17 men faced off for the four city commissioner seats. Cooksey won the primary by a substantial margin in the February 26 primary. He received 1,512 votes to Butler's 1,079. However another 1,987 votes were cast for the mayor's three other opponents: 887 for Douglas, 662 for Yearack and 478 for McCormick.

In his race against Cooksey, Butler campaigned against the "willy-nilly city administration." He campaigned for more jobs and economic development, addressing the issue of water supply and sewer lines, as well as dealing with flood control and drainage issues. He attacked Cooksey for the city's finances which were $42,000 in the red the previous year and scheduled to be $90,000 in the red by May 1963. According to Butler, "It's up to the mayor to study each problem as it arises, determine in his own mind what is best to do for all of the people. I think the mayor of any town has got to stand on his own two feet and make up his mind without being dictated to by any individual or group. I think also when a man is elected mayor the people are entitled to know where he stands. He ought to be able to tell the people. If a matter requires a 'yes' or 'no' answer he should say 'yes' or 'no.'"

The regional newspaper, the Southern Illinoisan endorsed Butler in his race. "Marion voters will choose Tuesday between orderly, progressive city government or a continuation of the present slap-dash regime... Butler, in short, offers an excellent alternative... He has our wholehearted support."

At the General Election two days later on April 16, Butler beat Cooksey by 687 votes, 2,914 to 2,227.

=== Tenure ===
Butler was sworn in as mayor on May 6, 1963. He served as mayor through many disasters, including the 1982 Marion Tornado that killed 10 and injured 200, and a disastrous fire in 1997 that burned down the town civic center.

In 2007, Butler opposed the Illinois electric rate increase. The New York Times ran a feature story on this issue featuring Butler.

Butler won his 14th election for mayor on April 7, 2015, with 71.8 percent of the vote in a three-way race. On May 5, 2015, Butler became the longest-serving mayor in Illinois history, surpassing the records of his friend and fellow Williamson County Mayor, Frank Caliper of Colp who served 52 years from 1935 to 1987. In 2019, he resigned and was succeeded by Commissioner Anthony Rinella.

== State politics ==
Butler was a delegate from the 57th district to the Illinois Constitutional Convention of 1970. During the convention, he proposed an amendment to elect the Illinois State Board of Education by region.

In 1976, Butler ran for the Illinois House of Representatives on the Republican ticket with incumbent Robert Winchester of Rosiclare against Democratic incumbents Clyde L. Choate of Anna and Richard O. Hart of Benton. Butler finished fourth of the four candidates.

== Death ==
Butler died on April 22, 2019, at 9:30 AM CDT in Marion, Illinois. On the same day, newly elected Marion mayor Mike Absher was sworn into office, the first time a mayor-elect other than Butler was sworn into office since 1959.
