= C. L. McCormick =

American politician and businessman

Member of the Illinois House of Representatives from the 59th district
- In office 1957–1975
- Preceded by: Homer M. Butler
- Succeeded by: Robert Winchester
- In office 1981–1983
- Preceded by: William L. Harris
- Succeeded by: District abolished

Personal details
- Born: December 1, 1919 McCormick, Illinois, U.S.
- Died: March 1, 1987 (aged 67) Metropolis, Illinois, U.S.
- Party: Republican

C.L. McCormick (December 1, 1919 – March 1, 1987) was an American politician and businessman.

== Early life ==
C.L. McCormick was born in McCormick, Illinois, an unincorporated community in Pope County, Illinois. C.L. was his full first name, possibly inspired by his grandfather Christian and his grandmother's maiden name Lay. He went to the Vienna, Illinois public schools and was elected to the Vienna, Illinois City Council. He served in the United States Army during World War II for forty-six months. After the war, he owned a taxi, merchandise, and restaurant business in Vienna, Illinois. In 1950, McCormick challenged the longtime incumbent county clerk of Johnson County in the Republican primary and was elected in that year's general election. He was reelected in 1954.

== Legislative career ==
He served in the Illinois House of Representatives from 1957 to 1975. He chose to retire rather than run for reelection in 1974. He was succeeded by fellow Republican Robert Winchester while fellow incumbents Clyde L. Choate and Richard O. Hart were reelected.

He returned to politics, defeating Democratic incumbent William L. Harris in the 1980 general election. He served in the Illinois House of Representatives again from 1981 to 1983. In 1981, he announced his decision to challenge Democratic incumbent Gene Johns for the Illinois Senate after the latter had been indicted for violating campaign contribution disclosure laws. In a three-way race with a candidate from the Equal Rights Party, Johns defeated McCormick to retain his seat. He died at Massac Hospital in Metropolis, Illinois.
