= Brandon Phelps (Illinois politician) =

American politician

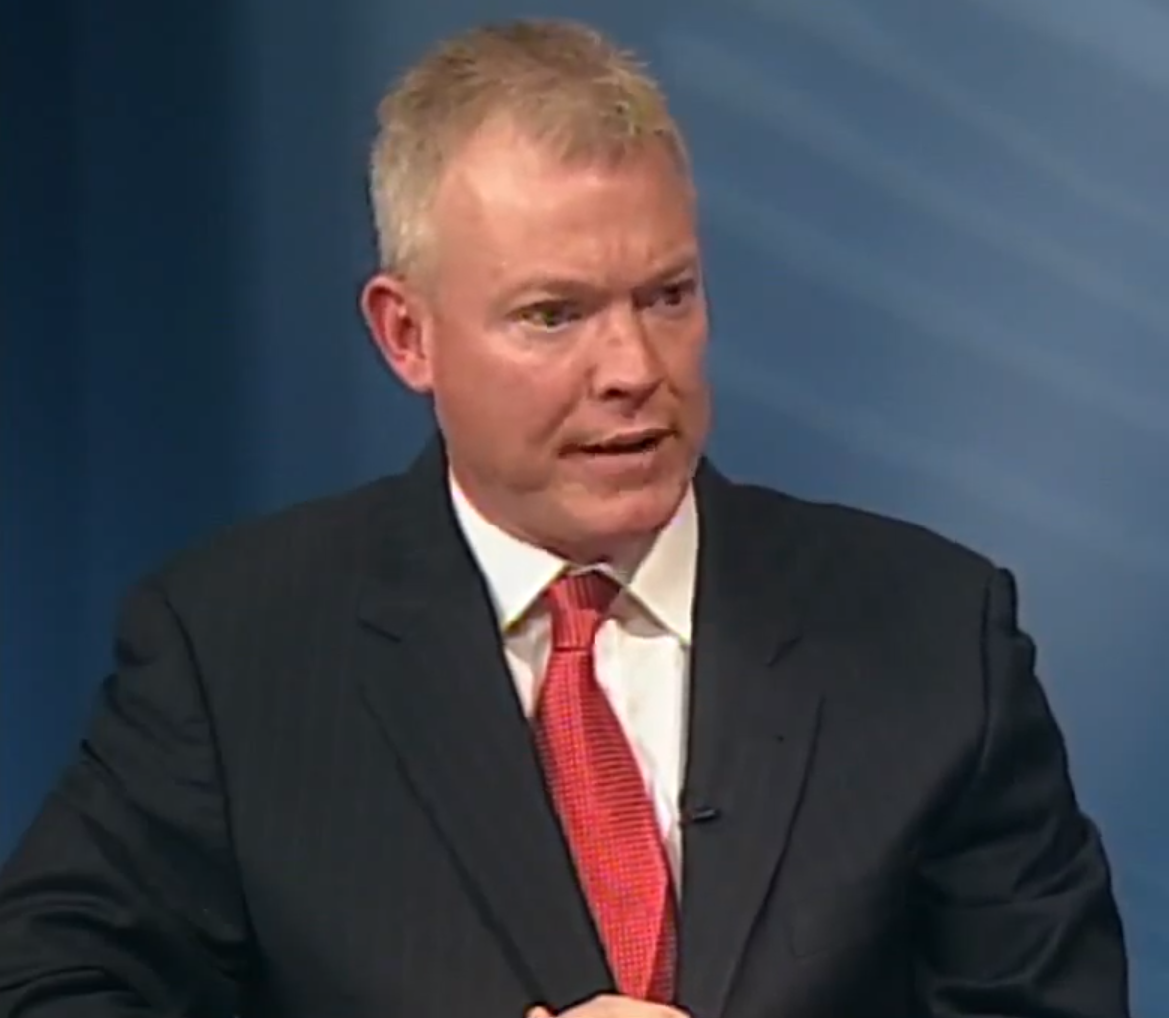

Member of the Illinois House of Representatives from the 118th district
- In office January 2003 – September 2017
- Preceded by: James D. Fowler
- Succeeded by: Natalie Phelps Finnie

Personal details
- Born: September 10, 1970 (age 56) Eldorado, Illinois, U.S.
- Party: Democratic
- Spouse: Haley
- Children: 1
- Education: Eastern Illinois University
- Occupation: Consultant

Brandon Phelps (born September 10, 1970) is a former Democratic member of the Illinois House of Representatives, representing the 118th District from January 2003 to September 2017. The 118th district, located in Southern Illinois, includes all or parts of Anna, Belknap, Belle Prairie City, Brookport, Broughton, Buncombe, Burnside, Cairo, Carbondale, Carrier Mills, Cave-In-Rock, Cypress, Dahlgren, Dongola, East Cape Girardeau, Eddyville, Eldorado, Elizabethtown, Equality, Galatia, Golconda, Goreville, Harrisburg, Joppa, Junction, Karnak, Makanda, Marion, McClure, McLeansboro, Metropolis, Mound City, Mounds, New Grand Chain, New Haven, Old Shawneetown, Olive Branch, Olmsted, Omaha, Pulaski, Raleigh, Ridgway, Rosiclare, Shawneetown, Simpson, Stonefort, Tamms, Thebes, Ullin, and Vienna. He resigned on September 1, 2017.

Phelps is the nephew of former U.S. Representative David D. Phelps.

Phelps sponsored the Illinois Transportation Taxes and Fees Lockbox Amendment in the Illinois House of Representatives.
