= Spillertown, Illinois =

Spillertown
- Village
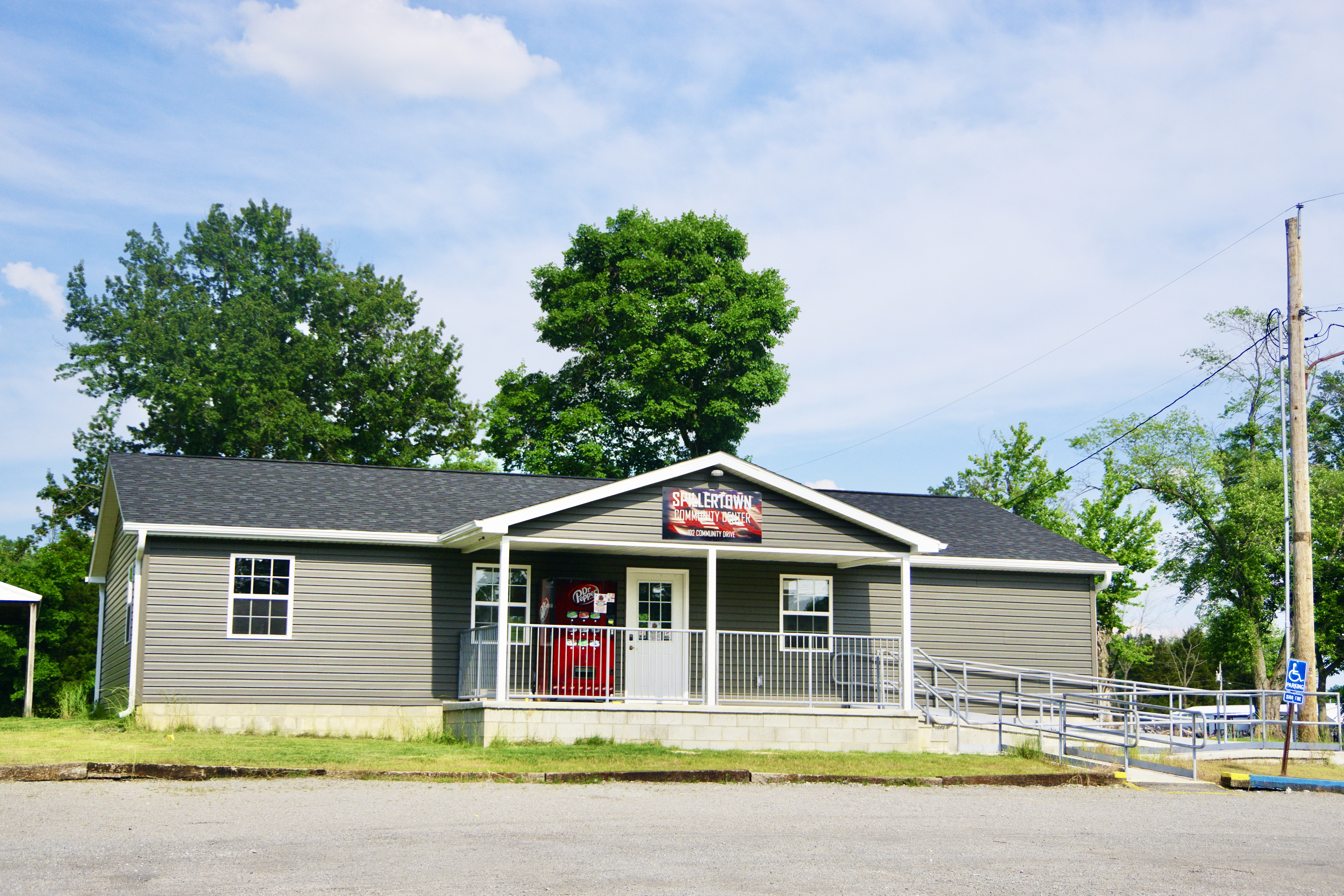
- Spillertown Community Center

- Flag Seal

- Location of Spillertown in Williamson County, Illinois.

- Location of Illinois in the United States
- Coordinates: 37°46′3″N 88°55′8″W
- Country: United States
- State: Illinois
- County: Williamson

Area
  - Total: 0.33 sq mi (0.85 km^{2})
  - Land: 0.32 sq mi (0.83 km^{2})
  - Water: 0.0077 sq mi (0.02 km^{2})
- Elevation: 486 ft (148 m)

Population (2020)
  - Total: 181
  - Density: 564.4/sq mi (217.93/km^{2})
- Time zone: UTC-6 (CST)
  - Summer (DST): UTC-5 (CDT)
- ZIP Code: 62959
- Area code: 618
- FIPS code: 17-71526
- GNIS feature ID: 2399873
- Wikimedia Commons: Spillertown, Illinois

Spillertown is a village in Williamson County, Illinois, United States. As of the 2020 census, Spillertown had a population of 181.

== History ==
Spillertown was incorporated as a village on March 3, 1900. It was named for Elijah Spiller, a prominent early settler who arrived in the area in 1817. Throughout the 19th century, Spillertown lay along an important wagon road that ran north from Marion to Benton, and eventually to Harmony, Indiana, where the nearest carding machines were located. A post office opened in 1898, but closed in 1914.

In August 2011, residents of the town began discussions with city officials in neighboring Marion about possible annexation.

== Geography ==
Spillertown is located at 37°46′3″N 88°55′8″W (37.767467, -88.918902).

According to the 2010 census, Spillertown has a total area of 0.369 square miles (0.96 km^{2}), of which 0.36 square miles (0.93 km^{2}) (or 97.56%) is land and 0.009 square miles (0.02 km^{2}) (or 2.44%) is water.

== Demographics ==
Historical population
| Census | Pop. | Note | %± |
|---|---|---|---|
| 1900 | 348 | | — |
| 1910 | 249 | | −28.4% |
| 1920 | 240 | | −3.6% |
| 1930 | 157 | | −34.6% |
| 1940 | 201 | | 28.0% |
| 1950 | 196 | | −2.5% |
| 1960 | 177 | | −9.7% |
| 1970 | 305 | | 72.3% |
| 1980 | 206 | | −32.5% |
| 1990 | 249 | | 20.9% |
| 2000 | 220 | | −11.6% |
| 2010 | 203 | | −7.7% |
| 2020 | 181 | | −10.8% |
U.S. Census

As of the census of 2000, there were 220 people, 84 households, and 61 families residing in the village. The population density was 707.5 inhabitants per square mile (273.2/km^{2}). There were 95 housing units at an average density of 305.5 per square mile (118.0/km^{2}). The racial makeup of the village was 97.27% White, 1.36% African American, 0.45% Asian, 0.91% from other races. Hispanic or Latino of any race were 3.64% of the population.

There were 84 households, out of which 38.1% had children under the age of 18 living with them, 59.5% were married couples living together, 13.1% had a female householder with no husband present, and 26.2% were non-families. 23.8% of all households were made up of individuals, and 7.1% had someone living alone who was 65 years of age or older. The average household size was 2.62 and the average family size was 3.10.

In the village, the population was spread out, with 25.5% under the age of 18, 14.5% from 18 to 24, 29.5% from 25 to 44, 20.0% from 45 to 64, and 10.5% who were 65 years of age or older. The median age was 30 years. For every 100 females, there were 98.2 males. For every 100 females age 18 and over, there were 102.5 males.

The median income for a household in the village was $33,125, and the median income for a family was $47,917. Males had a median income of $30,625 versus $21,250 for females. The per capita income for the village was $18,674. About 6.3% of families and 6.4% of the population were below the poverty line, including none of those under the age of eighteen and 20.9% of those 65 or over.

== Education ==
It is in the Marion Community Unit School District 2. The district operates Marion High School.
