= Marion School District =

Marion School District or Marion Independent School District may refer to:

- Marion School District (Arkansas), Marion, Arkansas
- Marion Community Unit School District 2, Marion, Illinois
- Marion Independent School District (Iowa), Marion, Iowa
- Marion Central School District, Marion, New York
- Marion School District 60-3, Marion, South Dakota
- Marion Independent School District (Texas), Marion, Texas
- Marion School District (Wisconsin), Marion, Wisconsin
