= Senator Johns =

Senator Johns may refer to:

- A. A. Johns (1864–1944), Arizona State Senate
- Charley Eugene Johns (1905–1990), Florida State Senate
- Gene Johns (1927–1984), Illinois State Senate
- Ronnie Johns (politician) (born 1949), Louisiana State Senate
- Susan Johns (born 1954), Kentucky State Senate
