= David Phelps (politician) =

American politician (born 1947)

Dave Phelps
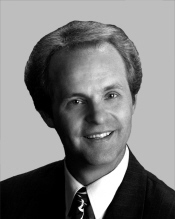

Member of the U.S. House of Representatives from Illinois's 19th district
- In office January 3, 1999 – January 3, 2003
- Preceded by: Glenn Poshard
- Succeeded by: John Shimkus (redistricted)

Member of the Illinois House of Representatives from the 118th district
- In office January 1985 – January 1999
- Preceded by: Robert Winchester
- Succeeded by: James D. Fowler

Personal details
- Born: David Dwain Phelps; October 26, 1947 (age 78) Eldorado, Illinois, U.S.
- Party: Democratic
- Spouse: Leslie Phelps
- Children: 4, including Natalie
- Education: Southern Illinois University, Carbondale (BS)

David Dwain Phelps (born October 26, 1947) is an American educator and politician and former Democratic member of the U.S. House of Representatives from Illinois.

== Early life ==
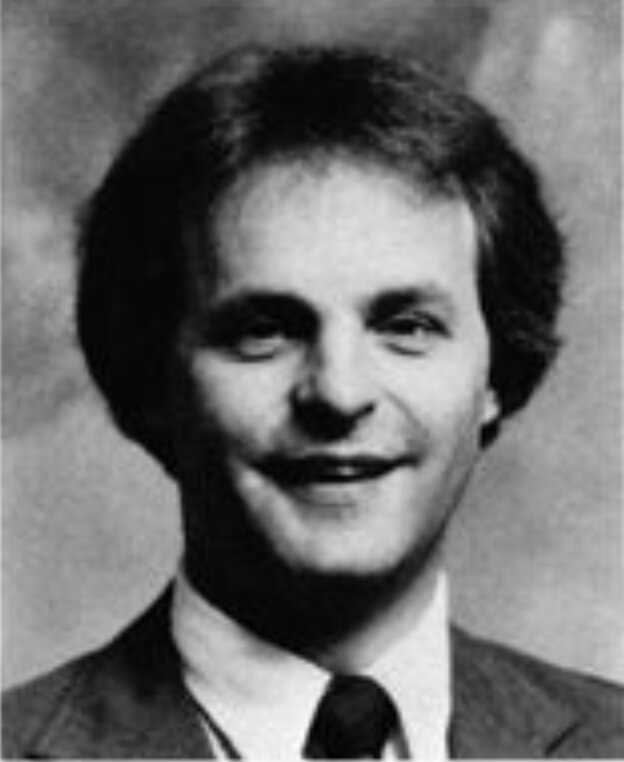
Rep. Phelps c. 1987–88

Phelps was born in Eldorado, Illinois. He graduated from Southern Illinois University in 1969. Phelps was trained as an educator. After teaching for several years, he became a school administrator. From 1980 to 1984, he served as Saline County Clerk and Recorder. Phelps was a member of the Illinois House of Representatives from 1984 until 1998.

== U.S. Congress ==
He was elected to Congress in 1998 from Illinois's 19th congressional district after 10-year incumbent Glenn Poshard made an unsuccessful run for governor. In 2002, Illinois lost a district as a result of the 2000 Census. Phelps' district was dismantled and split between three neighboring districts. His home in Eldorado was drawn into the Champaign-Urbana based 15th District, while Decatur, the heart of his former district, was shifted to the Quad Cities-based 17th District. The bulk of his former district was merged with the neighboring 20th District. Phelps ran against 20th District Republican incumbent John Shimkus in the general election. The new district was numerically Phelps' district—the 19th. However, it was geographically and demographically more Shimkus' district; Phelps only retained 35 percent of his former territory. The campaign was very bitter; both men accused the other's staffers of stalking their families. Shimkus won by over 20,000 votes in this much more conservative district.

The Illinois Office of Executive Inspector General found that David Phelps, a Democrat from Harrisburg, should be banned from working in state government because of his behavior as an assistant director of the Illinois Department of Transportation from 2003 to 2011. Phelps quit his $127,700 post in 2011 in the midst of an unfolding scandal involving similar allegations against one of his deputies at the agency, Danny Clayton. Three other workers and one contractor also were ensnared in the probe. Phelps was hired by former Gov. Rod Blagojevich after losing a bid for Congress to Republican U.S. Rep. John Shimkus of Collinsville in the 2002 election.

Phelps is a Blue Dog Democrat. While in Congress, he was strongly anti-abortion, pro-gun, and co-sponsored the Federal Marriage Amendment.

A professional songwriter, Phelps toured the nation as a gospel singer, in a quartet with his brothers. While serving in the U.S. House, he was the hymn director for the Congressional Weekly Prayer Breakfast on Capitol Hill.

== Post congressional life ==
As of August 2017, he was serving as a member of the Saline County Board.

Both his nephew, Brandon Phelps, and daughter, Natalie Phelps Finnie, served as members of the Illinois House of Representatives from the 118th district.

== Electoral history ==
Illinois's 19th congressional district: Results 1998–2002
Year	Democrat	Votes	Pct	Republican	Votes	Pct
1998	David D. Phelps	122,430	58%	Brent Winters	87,614	42%
2000	David D. Phelps	155,101	65%	James "Jim" Eatherly	85,137	35%
2002	David D. Phelps	110,517	45%	John Shimkus	133,956	55%

U.S. House of Representatives
Preceded by Glenn Poshard	Member of the U.S. House of Representatives from Illinois's 19th congressional district 1999–2003	Succeeded by John Shimkus
U.S. order of precedence (ceremonial)
Preceded by Ronnie Shows as Former U.S. Representative	Order of precedence of the United States as Former U.S. Representative	Succeeded by Phil Hare as Former U.S. Representative
