= Aaron Adeoye =

American football player (born 1993)

No. 51
- Position: Defensive end

Personal information
- Born: August 26, 1993 (age 33); Marion, Illinois, U.S.
- Listed height: 6 ft 6 in (1.98 m)
- Listed weight: 260 lb (118 kg)

Career information
- High school: Marion
- College: Southeast Missouri State
- NFL draft: 2016: undrafted

Career history
- Salina Liberty (2017); Birmingham Iron (2019); Baltimore Ravens (2019–2020); New York Jets (2021)*; Green Bay Packers (2021)*; Birmingham Stallions (2022); Arlington Renegades (2023); Edmonton Elks (2024)*
- * Offseason or practice squad member only

Awards and highlights
- USFL champion (2022); XFL champion (2023)
- Stats at Pro Football Reference

Aaron Adeoye (born August 26, 1993) is an American former football defensive end. He played college football at Southeast Missouri State University.

== College career ==
Adeoye played college basketball for Ball State, John A. Logan College, Western Kentucky, and Southeast Missouri State. He switched to football in his fifth season of college eligibility for the Southeast Missouri State Redhawks football team.

== Professional career ==
=== Indoor and minor leagues ===
Adeoye signed with the Salina Liberty of Champions Indoor Football in April 2017. He played in The Spring League in 2018, and played for the Birmingham Iron of the Alliance of American Football before the league folded in April 2019.

=== Baltimore Ravens ===
Adeoye had a minicamp tryout with the Baltimore Ravens and subsequently signed with the team on May 6, 2019. He was waived during final roster cuts on August 31, 2019, and signed to the team's practice squad the next day.

Adeoye signed a reserve/future contract with the Baltimore Ravens on January 13, 2020. He was waived during final roster cuts on September 5, 2020, and re-signed to the practice squad the next day. He was elevated to the active roster on December 2 for the team's week 12 game against the Pittsburgh Steelers, and reverted to the practice squad after the game. On January 18, 2021, Adeoye signed a reserve/futures contract with the Ravens. He was waived on August 16, 2021.

=== New York Jets ===
On August 23, 2021, Adeoye signed a one-year deal with the New York Jets. He was waived on August 31, 2021.

=== Green Bay Packers ===
On October 19, 2021, Adeoye was signed to the Green Bay Packers practice squad. He was released on November 2, 2021. He was signed to the practice squad again on December 29. He was released on January 1, 2022.

=== Birmingham Stallions ===
Adeoye was selected with the third pick of the second round of the 2022 USFL draft by the Birmingham Stallions. He was placed on injured reserve on May 12, 2022, with a chest injury.

=== Arlington Renegades ===
The Arlington Renegades selected Adeoye in the fifth round of the 2023 XFL Supplemental Draft on January 1, 2023. He was activated off of the reserve list on May 16, 2023. He was not part of the roster after the 2024 UFL dispersal draft on January 15, 2024.

=== Edmonton Elks ===
Adeoye signed with the Edmonton Elks of the Canadian Football League on February 1, 2024. He was released on May 16, 2024.
