= Clyde L. Choate =

American politician

Clyde Lee Choate
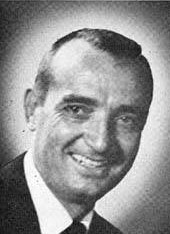

Member of the Illinois House of Representatives from the 59th district At large (1964-1966) 50th district (1947-1964)
- In office January 1947 – January 1977
- Preceded by: Herbert L. Upchurch
- Succeeded by: William L. Harris

Personal details
- Born: June 28, 1920 West Frankfort, Illinois
- Died: October 5, 2001 (aged 81) Carbondale, Illinois
- Party: Democratic
- Spouse: Mabel Madonna Ross (m. 1947-2001)
- Children: Two Daughters
- Military career
- Allegiance: United States
- Branch: United States Army
- Years: 1942-1946
- Rank: Staff Sergeant
- Unit: 601st Tank Destroyer Battalion
- Conflicts: World War II
- Awards: Full list

Clyde Lee Choate (June 28, 1920 – October 5, 2001) was an American politician from Southern Illinois and a decorated soldier. The Anna, Illinois, resident served 30 years in the Illinois House of Representatives. As a sergeant in the United States Army during World War II, Choate received the U.S. military's highest decoration, the Medal of Honor, for single-handedly destroying a German tank.

== Biography ==
Choate was born in West Frankfort, Illinois, one of 12 children born to a coal miner. He and his family moved to Anna, where he worked as a farmer while attending school. He graduated from Anna-Jonesboro High School.

=== World War II ===
He enlisted in the Army as a private during World War II and served 31 months overseas in the European Theatre. He took part in the invasions of North Africa, Sicily, Italy, France, and Germany as a sergeant. He was cited for bravery in action on Anzio beachhead in Italy and twice in France. While in France, he refused a battlefield commission.

By October 25, 1944, Choate was serving as a staff sergeant in Company C, 601st Tank Destroyer Battalion. On that day, near Bruyères in eastern France, his tank destroyer was hit and set on fire in an attack by German forces. He ordered his crew to abandon the destroyer and reached a position of relative safety, but then returned through hostile fire to the burning vehicle to make sure no one was trapped inside. Seeing a German tank overrunning American infantry soldiers, he single-handedly attacked and destroyed the tank. In a ceremony at the White House on August 23, 1945, President Harry S. Truman presented Choate with the Medal of Honor for his actions near Bruyères. He maintained his Medal of Honor was not his alone, but belonged to the entire 601st Tank Destroyer Battalion.

While serving, he was wounded in action and was awarded the Purple Heart, French Fourragere, Bronze Star Medal, Silver Star Medal, and Presidential Citation. He was honorably discharged in 1946. As a veteran, he was an active member of the American Legion, Veterans of Foreign Wars and the Military Order of the Purple Heart.

=== Illinois House of Representatives ===
At his Medal of Honor presentation ceremony, Choate shared his concerns about the coal industry in southern Illinois. In response, President Truman encouraged him to run for public office. In 1946, Choate was elected to the Illinois House of Representatives as one of three representatives from the 50th district, succeeding fellow Democrat Herbert L. Upchurch. The 50th district included Alexander, Franklin, Pulaski, Union and Williamson counties in southwestern Illinois. Shortly after his election, he married Mabel Madonna Ross of Carbondale, Illinois, on May 10, 1947. They had two daughters: Elizabeth Ellen and Madonna Kim.

The 1960 reapportionment process was stalled by partisan gridlock. In 1964, the Illinois Supreme Court ordered an at-large election for all 177 members of the Illinois House. Voters were given ballots three feet long. Choate was the Democratic downstate coordinator for the at-large election. After a 1965 Illinois Supreme Court Case to resolve the redistricting issue, Choate's home was drawn into the 59th district, which consisted of the territory of the old 50th district (except Franklin County) and added Jackson, Gallatin, Johnson, Pope, Hardin, and Massac. He ran in the 59th district and was elected with Republicans C. L. McCormick and Gale R. Williams.

As a member of the Illinois House, Choate was a close ally of Chicago Mayor Richard J. Daley. Still, he led a 1969 revolt of downstate Democrats against a plan to implement a 3% income tax; Choate preferred a plan for a 4% rate for corporations and a 2.5% rate for individuals. He served in a variety of party leadership positions including minority whip (1957-1960), 69th and 70th; majority whip (1961-1964), majority leader (1965-1966), minority whip (1967-1970) and minority leader (1971-1974). In 1972, he served as chairman of the Illinois delegation to 1972 Democratic National Convention.

In the 1974 elections, the Democrats won a majority in the Illinois House. Choate was Daley's choice to assume the role as Speaker of the Illinois House of Representatives. But Governor Dan Walker strongly disliked Choate, who had helped quash his son-in-law's Democratic primary bid, and supported Gerald A. Bradley of Bloomington. For the first few days, no one in the field, which at various points included up to 11 Democrats and the Republican leader James R. Washburn, could get close to the 89 votes required to be elected Speaker. After 38 ballots, Daley and Walker finally chose longtime backbencher William A. Redmond as a compromise candidate. Redmond was only candidate neither could object to who had the experience to preside over the House. On the 39th ballot, the Daley and Walker factions coalesced around Redmond, giving him 71 of the needed votes. Choate refused to drop out and, with a small group of Democrats, held out against Redmond as the Democratic compromise choice. Over a week after the election for Speaker began, newly elected Republican Lee A. Daniels crossed party lines to vote for Redmond. After Daniels' vote, a weekend recess was called. On Monday, Daniels and a group of seven Republicans cast their votes for Redmond.

After winning reelection in 1976, Choate announced his decision to step down on January 8, 1977. William L. Harris, Vice Chairman of the Illinois State Board of Elections, was appointed by local Democratic leaders to succeed him.

=== After legislative life ===
After retiring from elective politics, Choate became director of external affairs for Southern Illinois University. He attended the May 28, 1999, unveiling of the Medal of Honor Memorial in Indianapolis, Indiana. He died at age 81 at a hospital in Carbondale, Illinois, from complications of congestive heart failure. He was buried at Anna Cemetery in Anna.

== Military honors ==
In addition to the following American military honors, Choate was awarded the French Fourragère.

== Medal of Honor citation ==
 Staff Sergeant Choate's Medal of Honor citation reads:

He commanded a tank destroyer near Bruyeres, France, on October 25, 1944. Our infantry occupied a position on a wooded hill when, at dusk, an enemy Mark IV tank and a company of infantry attacked, threatening to overrun the American position and capture a command post 400 yards to the rear. S/Sgt. Choate's tank destroyer, the only weapon available to oppose the German armor, was set afire by 2 hits. Ordering his men to abandon the destroyer, S/Sgt. Choate reached comparative safety. He returned to the burning destroyer to search for comrades possibly trapped in the vehicle risking instant death in an explosion which was imminent and braving enemy fire which ripped his jacket and tore the helmet from his head. Completing the search and seeing the tank and its supporting infantry overrunning our infantry in their shallow foxholes, he secured a bazooka and ran after the tank, dodging from tree to tree and passing through the enemy's loose skirmish line. He fired a rocket from a distance of 20 yards, immobilizing the tank but leaving it able to spray the area with cannon and machinegun fire. Running back to our infantry through vicious fire, he secured another rocket, and, advancing against a hail of machinegun and small-arms fire reached a position 10 yards from the tank. His second shot shattered the turret. With his pistol he killed 2 of the crew as they emerged from the tank; and then running to the crippled Mark IV while enemy infantry sniped at him, he dropped a grenade inside the tank and completed its destruction. With their armor gone, the enemy infantry became disorganized and was driven back. S/Sgt. Choate's great daring in assaulting an enemy tank single-handed, his determination to follow the vehicle after it had passed his position, and his skill and crushing thoroughness in the attack prevented the enemy from capturing a battalion command post and turned a probable defeat into a tactical success.

== See also ==
- List of Medal of Honor recipients
- List of Medal of Honor recipients for World War II
