= Upchurch (surname) =

Upchurch is an English surname derived from the English town of the same name, but mostly popular in the United States and to a lesser extent in New Zealand. Notable people with the surname include:

- Avery C. Upchurch (1928–1994), American mayor
- Carl Upchurch (1950–2003), American activist
- Greg Upchurch (born 1971), American drummer
- Herbert L. Upchurch (1908–1979), American politician and educator
- Ian Upchurch, New Zealand soccer player
- James Upchurch (born 1968), American murderer
- Joseph Upchurch, a victim of racist violence in 1927, see Lynching of Joseph Upchurch
- Ken Upchurch (born 1969), American newspaper publisher
- Phil Upchurch (1941–2025), American jazz-blues guitarist
- Rick Upchurch (born 1952), American football player
- Ryan Upchurch (born 1991), American singer
- Terrence Upchurch (born 1988), American politician
- Woody Upchurch (1911–1971), American baseball player

== See also ==
- Upchurch, England
