= Glenn Poshard =

American politician and educator (born 1945)

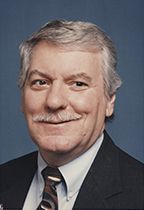

President of Southern Illinois University
- In office January 1, 2006 – May 1, 2014
- Preceded by: James Walker
- Succeeded by: Randy Dunn

Member of the U.S. House of Representatives from Illinois
- In office January 3, 1989 – January 3, 1999
- Preceded by: Kenneth Gray
- Succeeded by: David Phelps
- Constituency: 22nd district (1989–1993); 19th district (1993–1999)

Member of the Illinois Senate from the 59th district
- In office August 27, 1984 – January 3, 1989
- Preceded by: Gene Johns
- Succeeded by: Jim Rea

Personal details
- Born: Glendal William Poshard; October 30, 1945 (age 80) Herald, Illinois, U.S.
- Party: Democratic
- Spouse: Jo
- Children: 2
- Education: Southern Illinois University, Carbondale (BS, MS, PhD)

Military service
- Allegiance: United States
- Branch/service: United States Army
- Years of service: 1962–1965
- Unit: 1st Cavalry Division

Glendal William Poshard (born October 30, 1945) is an American educator and former politician who served as an Illinois state senator and U.S. Congressman, serving five terms in Congress from 1989 to 1999.

He was also an Illinois gubernatorial candidate, and president of the Southern Illinois University system.

== Early life and career ==
Poshard was born October 30, 1945, in Herald, Illinois. He served in South Korea with the 1st Cavalry Division of the United States Army. Poshard is a three-degree graduate of Southern Illinois University. He received a bachelor's degree in secondary education in 1970, a master's degree in educational administration in 1974 and a Ph.D. in administration of higher education in 1984. After graduating from college, he taught high school, coached high school sports, and served as director of the Southern Illinois Educational Service Center in Benton, Illinois from 1975 to 1984.

=== Illinois Senate ===
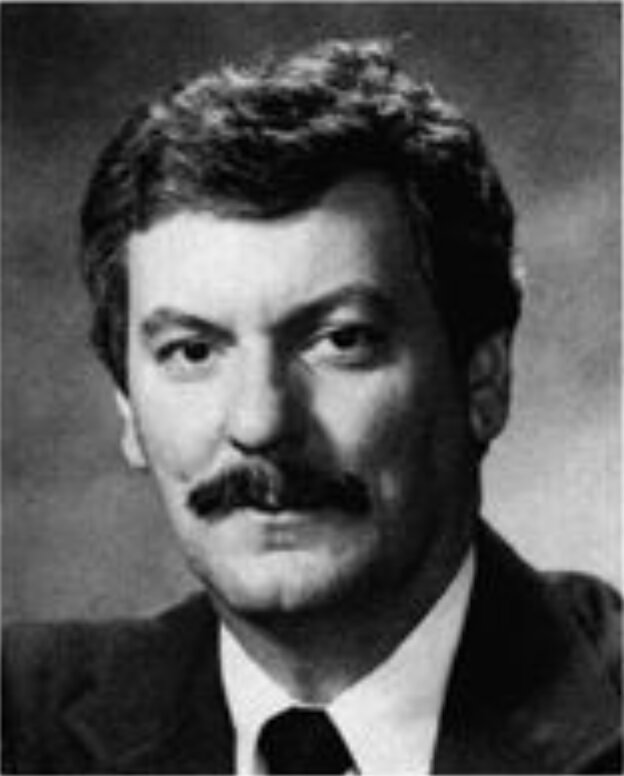
Senator Poshard c. 1987–88

In the 1982 Democratic primary, Poshard challenged incumbent State Senator Gene Johns, but lost. After Johns' death two years later, local Democratic leaders appointed Poshard to the vacancy. Eve Johns, Johns' widow and an unsuccessful candidate for the appointment, opted to run as an independent. As no candidate ran in for the Republican nomination in the 1984 primary, local Republican leaders nominated State Representative Robert Winchester. In the 1984 general election, Poshard was victorious winning 47,230 votes to Winchester's 39,173 votes and Johns' 5,862 votes. In the 1986 general election, Poshard was reelected by a commanding margin against Republican candidate Richard Simmons of Marion.

Poshard served in the Illinois Senate from August 1984 to January 1989. Poshard resigned from the Illinois Senate on January 2, 1989 to take his seat in Congress. Local Democratic leaders chose State Representative Jim Rea from a field of fourteen applicants.

== Congressional service ==
Poshard ran for U.S. Representative from Illinois' 22nd Congressional District and was elected in 1988. After Illinois lost a district as a result of the 1990 Census, Poshard's district was merged with the neighboring 19th District of fellow Democratic Congressman Terry L. Bruce. The new district contained 40% of Bruce's constituents from the old 19th and 30% of Poshard's constituents from the old 22nd. Poshard was able to win large majorities in the far southern part of the district and subsequently Poshard won the Democratic primary with approximately 62% of the vote. During the primary, Poshard was outspent $800,000 to $200,000. Poshard was reelected to another three terms.

As Congressman, he was considered to be a social conservative and fiscal progressive populist; he was opposed to abortion, gay marriage, and the death penalty largely on religious grounds, and opposed free trade agreements. The National Taxpayers Union ranked him 13th of 256 Democrats in the 103rd Congress. He was also a strong proponent of campaign finance reform. He sponsored the Illinois Wilderness Act of 1990, which created the Garden of the Gods Wilderness, and he cosponsored the Transportation Equity Act for the 21st Century and the Credit Union Membership Access Act. He voted against the Flag Desecration Amendment.

While in Congress, he twice earned a place on Roll Call's Obscure Caucus list and earned a reputation as prioritizing his district's needs over national media.

After he left Congress, Poshard and his wife Jo founded the Poshard Foundation for Abused Children, which raises more than $100,000 annually to fund care for abused children and other victims of domestic abuse throughout southern Illinois. Among its many activities, the Poshard Foundation led efforts to construct a new $600,000 women's shelter in Cairo, Illinois that opened in December 2003.

== Gubernatorial campaign ==
In 1998 Poshard ran for governor against Republican Secretary of State George Ryan. He was somewhat more conservative on social issues than Ryan, a moderate Republican. While this garnered him support from social conservatives who normally voted Republican, it also cost him some support from Chicago liberals.

In keeping with his views on campaign financing, Poshard severely curtailed contributions to his campaign. He refused to accept any corporate or special interest group donations and limited private donations to a small amount per individual. He thus faced a significant financial disadvantage in the campaign against Ryan and was outspent by a roughly 4 to 1 margin.

Poshard was first to alert the public about Ryan's connection to the "licenses for bribes" scandal and other corruption. Some individuals, even prominent Democrats like former Senator Paul Simon, criticized Poshard for his attacks on Ryan's corruption. However, Poshard was vindicated to a considerable extent when Ryan was indicted in late 2003 on 22 counts of racketeering conspiracy, mail and tax fraud, and false statements charges alleging public corruption during his terms as Illinois Secretary of State and as governor. Ryan was subsequently convicted and was sentenced to serve six and a half years in prison.

Poshard lost the governor's race to Ryan by a 47–51% margin. In his concession speech, Poshard declared that "no purpose is served by anger or resentment. No good is served by dropping out of the system in the future. The time for disappointment is only for this evening. Tomorrow we go back to work."

== Continued political career ==
On February 10, 2004, Governor Rod Blagojevich appointed Poshard to the Southern Illinois University Board of Trustees for a term commencing January 23, 2004 and ending January 17, 2005. Poshard was confirmed by the Illinois Senate on February 26, 2004. That same year, on November 16, 2004, Governor Rod Blagojevich appointed Poshard to serve as the Chair of the Health Facilities Planning Board for a term ending July 1, 2007. Poshard resigned from the Health Facilities Planning Board after becoming the President of Southern Illinois University. In 2004, he also served as the unpaid, interim general manager of the Rend Lake Conservancy District, which supplies water to more than 60 southern Illinois towns.

At the conclusion of the one-year term, Governor Blagojevich appointed Poshard to a six year term on the SIU Board of Trustees. Poshard was later elected Chairman of the Board of Trustees. He resigned his position on the board of trustees in 2005 when he announced his candidacy for the presidency of the Southern Illinois University system.

In the 2022 Democratic primary, Poshard was elected unopposed to the position of Democratic State Central Committeeman for Illinois's 12th congressional district. He serves as one of the district's two representatives to the Democratic Party of Illinois alongside Central Committeewoman Vivian Robinson.

== Continued higher education career ==
In 1999, Poshard was hired by Southern Illinois University Carbondale to serve as the Vice Chancellor of Administration. He would serve in the position until his appointment to the SIU Board of Trustees.

In 2005, Poshard put his name forward for consideration to become the President of the Southern Illinois University system. On November 14, 2005, the SIU Board of Trustees passed a resolution authorizing a contract to be signed between the SIU system and Poshard. The next month, at their December 8, 2005 meeting, a resolution approving the contract was passed. He took office on January 1, 2006. Poshard was accused of plagiarism in 2007 after it was revealed that portions of his doctoral dissertation were lifted from another source without attribution. The faculty senate at Southern Illinois University Edwardsville asked Poshard to step down as president. Poshard was later acquitted of plagiarism charges after a university committee he appointed called it "inadvertent plagiarism". He retired after the 2013-14 school year. On October 7, 2022, SIU Carbondale's Transportation Education Center at Southern Illinois Airport was named the Glenn Poshard Transportation Education Center in recognition of Poshard's leadership at the SIU system.

In 2016, Poshard was appointed to the John A. Logan College Board of Trustees following the death of Trustee Bill Alstat. He was elected to the position in 2017 and re-elected in 2021.

Morthland College's board of trustees voted unanimously to hire Poshard as the president of Morthland College effective February 13, 2017. After two months in the position, citing serious issues with the college's finances and personnel that had not been disclosed during the hiring process, Poshard resigned from the position effective April 26, 2017. An investigation by the United States Department of Education of financial mismanagement by the college, started in January 2017 prior to Poshard's hiring, resulted in its closure in 2018.

== Electoral history ==
Illinois gubernatorial election, 1998
Party	Candidate	Votes	%	±%
Republican	George Ryan / Corinne Wood	1,714,094	51.03%	−12.85%
Democratic	Glenn Poshard / Mary Lou Kearns	1,594,191	47.46%	+13.02%
Reform	Lawrence Redmond / Phyllis Nirchi	50,372	1.50%	
Write-ins		48	0.00%	
Majority		119,903	3.57%	−25.87%
Turnout		3,358,705	49.72%	
Republican hold		Swing		

District	Incumbent			This race	
District	Representative	Party	Election	Results	Candidates
Illinois 19	Glenn Poshard	Democratic	1996	Incumbent re-elected.	✓ Glenn Poshard (Democratic) 66.69%; Brent Winters (Republican) 31.83%; Patricia Riker (Natural Law) 0.95%; James Lacher (Libertarian) 0.53%
Illinois 19	Glenn Poshard	Democratic	1994	Incumbent re-elected.	✓ Glenn Poshard (Democratic) 58.4%; Brent Winters (Republican) 41.6%
Illinois 19	Glenn Poshard; Redistricted from the 22nd district	Democratic	1992	Incumbent re-elected.	✓ Glenn Poshard (Democratic) 69.1%; Douglas E. Lee (Republican) 30.9%
Illinois 19	Terry L. Bruce	Democratic	1992	Redistricting contest Democratic loss.	✓ Glenn Poshard (Democratic) 69.1%; Douglas E. Lee (Republican) 30.9%
Illinois 22	Glenn Poshard	Democratic	1990	Incumbent re-elected.	✓ Glenn Poshard (Democratic) 83.7%; Jim Wham (Independent) 16.3%
Illinois 22	Kenneth J. Gray	Democratic	1988	Incumbent retired. New member elected. Democratic hold.	✓ Glenn Poshard (Democratic) 64.9%; Patrick J. Kelley (Republican) 35.1%

U.S. House of Representatives
Preceded by Kenneth Gray	Member of the U.S. House of Representatives from Illinois's 22nd congressional district 1989–1993	Constituency abolished
Preceded by Terry Bruce	Member of the U.S. House of Representatives from Illinois's 19th congressional district 1993–1999	Succeeded by David Phelps
Party political offices
Preceded by Dawn Clark Netsch	Democratic nominee for Governor of Illinois; 1998	Succeeded by Rod Blagojevich
U.S. order of precedence (ceremonial)
Preceded by Gregg Harper as Former U.S. Representative	Order of precedence of the United States as Former U.S. Representative	Succeeded by Thomas W. Ewing as Former U.S. Representative
