= Jackson Falls =

Waterfall in Illinois, United States

Coordinates: 37°30′29″N 88°40′59″W

Jackson Falls is a seasonal waterfall within Shawnee National Forest in the U.S. state of Illinois. The sandstone bluffs of the shut-in are best known as a venue for rock climbing and speed climbing. A nearby campsite makes the falls area a noted location for the road-tripping climb community. The climbing area and formation is located near McCormick, an unincorporated hamlet within Pope County, Illinois.

== Rock climbing ==
The Jackson Falls glen contains approximately 500 named climbing routes, grouped into 60 climbing areas. The climbing routes utilize the gully's bluffs and small monoliths. The erosional history of the shut-in ensures that many of the climbs are 50 to 60 feet (15–18 meters) in height. The Illinois Office of Tourism describes the locality as a site of sports routes and bouldering.

== See also ==
- Burden Falls
