= Gary Forby =

American politician (born 1945)

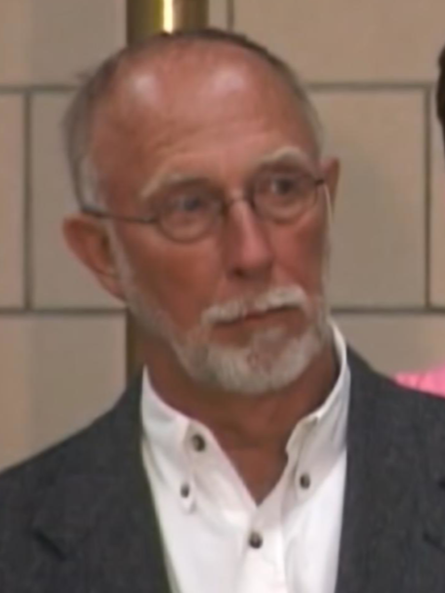
- Forby in Cairo, Illinois in 2011

Member of the Illinois Senate from the 59th district
- In office June 7, 2003 – January 11, 2017
- Preceded by: Larry D. Woolard
- Succeeded by: Dale Fowler

Member of the Illinois House of Representatives from the 117th district
- In office January 2001 – June 2003
- Preceded by: Larry D. Woolard
- Succeeded by: John Bradley

Personal details
- Born: January 4, 1945 (age 81) Anna, Illinois
- Party: Democratic
- Spouse: Angie Forby
- Profession: Farmer and business owner

Gary Forby (born January 4, 1945) is a former Democratic member of the Illinois Senate. He represented the 59th District from 2003 to 2017. The 59th Senate District includes Franklin, Hamilton, Williamson, Saline, Gallatin, Hardin, Pope, Massac, Johnson, Union, Pulaski and Alexander counties in Southern Illinois.

He was previously a member of the Illinois House of Representatives from 2001 to 2003 before being appointed to fill former State Senator Larry Woolard’s vacant seat in 2003. He was defeated in his bid for another term on November 8, 2016.

== Early life, education and career ==
Born in Anna in 1945, Forby is a Southern Illinois native. He currently lives in Benton with his four children and one grandchild and remains very active in a number of local community organizations such as the Shriners and the Elk’s Club. He has also been an active member of the Engineers’ and Laborers’ International Unions.

== Political career ==
Before being becoming a member of the General Assembly, Forby worked on his farm in Southern Illinois and as an excavating contractor at Forby Excavating, a small business based in Benton, Illinois. Forby has served as the Chair of the Franklin County Board and as a member of the Benton Township Board. On June 17, 2003, Forby was appointed to the Illinois Senate to succeed Larry D. Woolard. On June 18, 2003, John Bradley was appointed to succeed Forby in the Illinois House of Representatives.

On March 20, 2012, Forby won the Democratic Primary with 12,692 votes (77% of those voting). He defeated Republican Mark Minor in the General Election. In 2016, Forby lost the race for the 59th district to Republican Dale Fowler.
