= James F. Rea =

American politician (1937–2024)

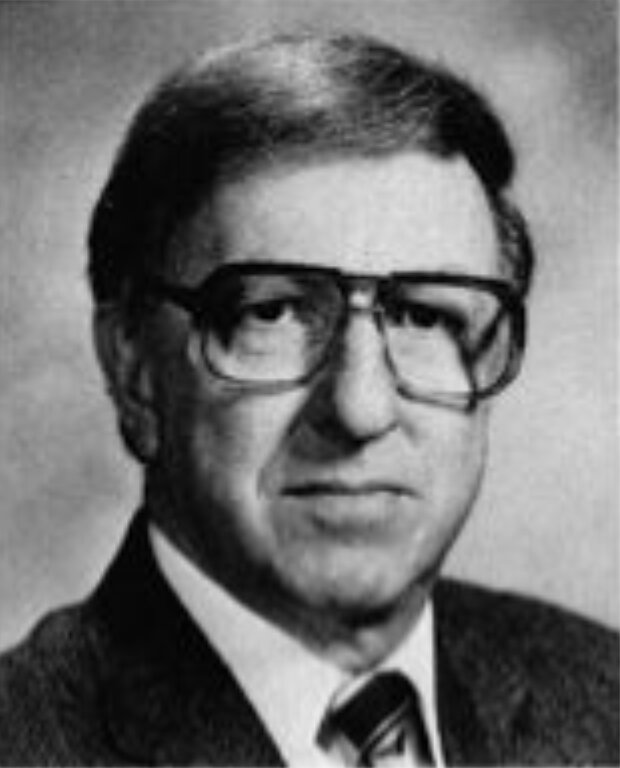
Rea c. 1987–88

James F. Rea (September 7, 1937 – November 25, 2024) was an American politician.

== Life and career ==
Rea was born in Mulkeytown, Illinois. He served in the United States Military. Rea received his bachelor's and master's degree in agriculture community development from the Southern Illinois University. Rea lived with his wife and family in Christopher, Illinois. Rea served in the Illinois House of Representatives from 1979 to 1989 and was a Democrat. After Glenn Poshard was elected to the United States House of Representatives, Rea was appointed to the Illinois Senate. Rea was succeeded in the House by Larry D. Woolard. Rea then served in the Illinois Senate from 1989 to 1999. Rea stepped down to take a position with the Illinois Secretary of State. Ned Mitchell, the Mayor of Sesser, was appointed by local Democratic Party chairs to succeed Rea.

Rea died on November 25, 2024, at the age of 87.
