= Natalie Phelps Finnie =

American politician

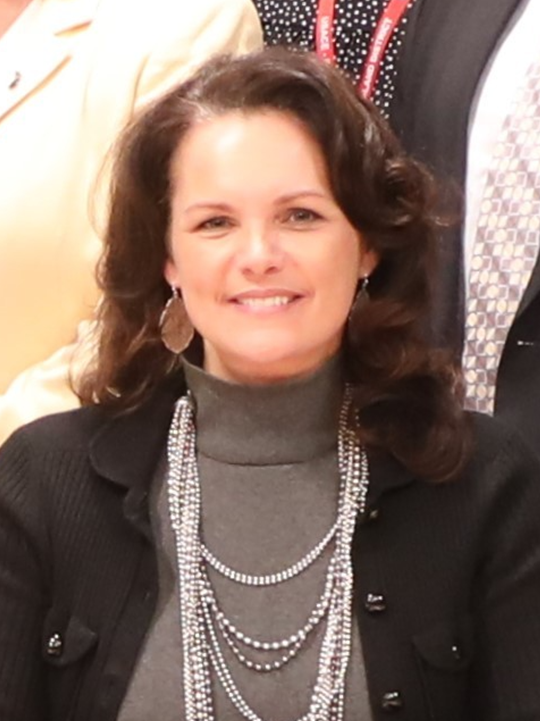
- Phelps Finnie in 2023

Member of the Illinois House of Representatives from the 118th district
- In office September 6, 2017 – January 9, 2019
- Preceded by: Brandon Phelps
- Succeeded by: Patrick Windhorst

Personal details
- Party: Democratic
- Occupation: Nurse Practitioner

Natalie Phelps Finnie is the Director of the Illinois Department of Natural Resources. She was a Democratic member of the Illinois House of Representatives, representing the 118th District from September 2017 to January 2019.

== Early life and career ==
Finnie received her Associate of Science and Bachelor of Science in nursing at the University of Southern Indiana. She received her Master of Science in nursing at Vanderbilt University. Phelps Finnie lives in Elizabethtown, Illinois with her husband, son, and two daughters. She is the daughter of former U.S. Representative David D. Phelps.

== Illinois House of Representatives ==
On September 1, 2017, Brandon Phelps resigned from the Illinois House of Representatives. The Democratic Representative Committee of the 118th Representative District appointed Phelps Finnie to fill the vacancy left by the resignation. She was sworn into office on September 6, 2017.

Phelps Finnie lost the 2018 general election to Republican candidate Patrick Windhorst by a 12.9 point margin.

== Post-legislative career ==
After her loss, she took a position as deputy director of the Illinois Department of Natural Resources, where she oversaw the Office of Land Management, Legislative Department, Office of Oil & Gas Management, and Office of Mines and Mineral. On January 23, 2023, it was announced that Governor J. B. Pritzker appointed Finnie as director of the department.
