= Burden Falls Wilderness =

Protected area in Illinois, US

- IUCN category Ib (wilderness area)
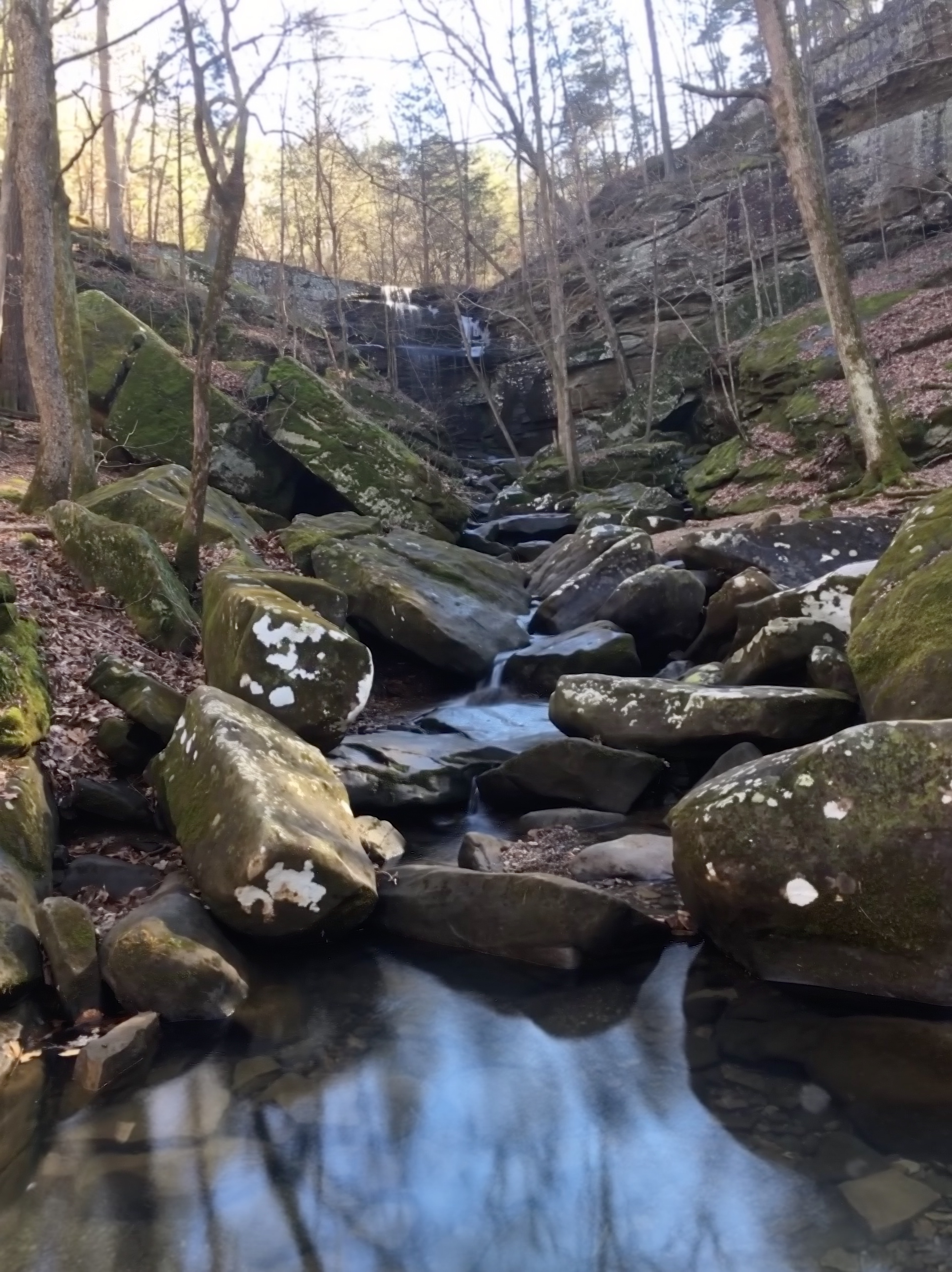
- Burden Falls in winter

- Location within Illinois Location within the United States
- Location: Pope / Saline counties, Illinois, USA
- Nearest city: Harrisburg, IL
- Coordinates: 37°33′48.6″N 88°38′32.7″W
- Area: 3,775 acres (15.28 km^{2})
- Established: 1990
- Governing body: U.S. Forest Service

The Burden Falls Wilderness is a 3,775-acre (15.3 km^{2}) unit of the Shawnee National Forest. It is located in northwestern Pope County and southwestern Saline County, Illinois. The wilderness is characterized by road-less second-growth hardwood forest, punctuated by a small, seasonal waterfall on Burden Creek. Burden Falls falls 20 feet (6 m) over a sandstone ledge, and the falling creek then descends another 80 feet (25 m) in a series of cascades and cataracts.

Although this is a small waterfall by the nationwide standards of the United States, Burden Falls is one of the highest waterfalls in Illinois. Unlike most of the state, Pope County and extreme southern Illinois escaped glaciation during the Ice ages, and steep slopes display the effects of lengthy erosion. Similar geological features in other regions of Illinois were ground into oblivion by the ice. Watercourses confined by sandstone ledges, of the sort found in Burden Falls Wilderness, are locally known as shut-ins.

Hardwood trees in the wilderness include blackjack oak, post oak, and white oak, the state tree of Illinois.

Hikers use the Burden Falls Trail, a 3.5-mile (5.5 km) pathway. The nearest town of any size is Eddyville, Illinois.

The Burden Falls tract was listed as a wilderness under the Illinois Wilderness Act of 1990.

== See also ==
- Jackson Falls
