= Larry D. Woolard =

American politician (born 1941)

Larry Woolard

Member of the Illinois Senate from the 59th district
- In office January 2001 – June 2003
- Preceded by: Ned Mitchell
- Succeeded by: Gary Forby

Member of the Illinois House of Representatives from the 117th district
- In office January 1989 – January 2001
- Preceded by: Jim Rea
- Succeeded by: Gary Forby

Personal details
- Born: September 20, 1941 (age 84) Williamson County, Illinois
- Party: Democratic
- Spouse: Mary Ann Switzer
- Children: Four
- Profession: Business owner

Military service
- Allegiance: United States
- Branch/service: United States Army
- Unit: Army Reserve

Larry D. Woolard (born September 20, 1941) was a Democratic member of the Illinois General Assembly serving in the House from 1989 to 2001 and the Senate from 2001 to 2003.

Born in Williamson County, Illinois, Woolard lived in Carterville, Illinois with his wife and family. In 1989, State Representative Jim Rea was appointed to the Illinois Senate. Woolard was then appointed to succeed Rea in the Illinois House of Representatives. Woolard served in the Illinois House of Representatives from 1989 to 2001.

In 1999, Ned Mitchell, the Mayor of Sesser, was appointed by local Democratic Party chairs to succeed Senator Rea who had resigned to take a job with the Illinois Secretary of State. Woolard chose to challenge Mitchell in the 2000 Democratic primary for the 59th district. Woolard won the primary and took office January 2001. Woolard served in the Illinois State Senate from 2001 to 2003.

In June 2003, Woolard resigned from the Illinois Senate to take a job with the Illinois Department of Commerce and Economic Opportunity. He was succeeded by Gary Forby. He served as a regional manager for southern Illinois in the department. As part of this role, he served as the designee for the Governor of Illinois on the board of the Delta Regional Authority.
