= Pittsburg, Illinois =

Pittsburg
- Village
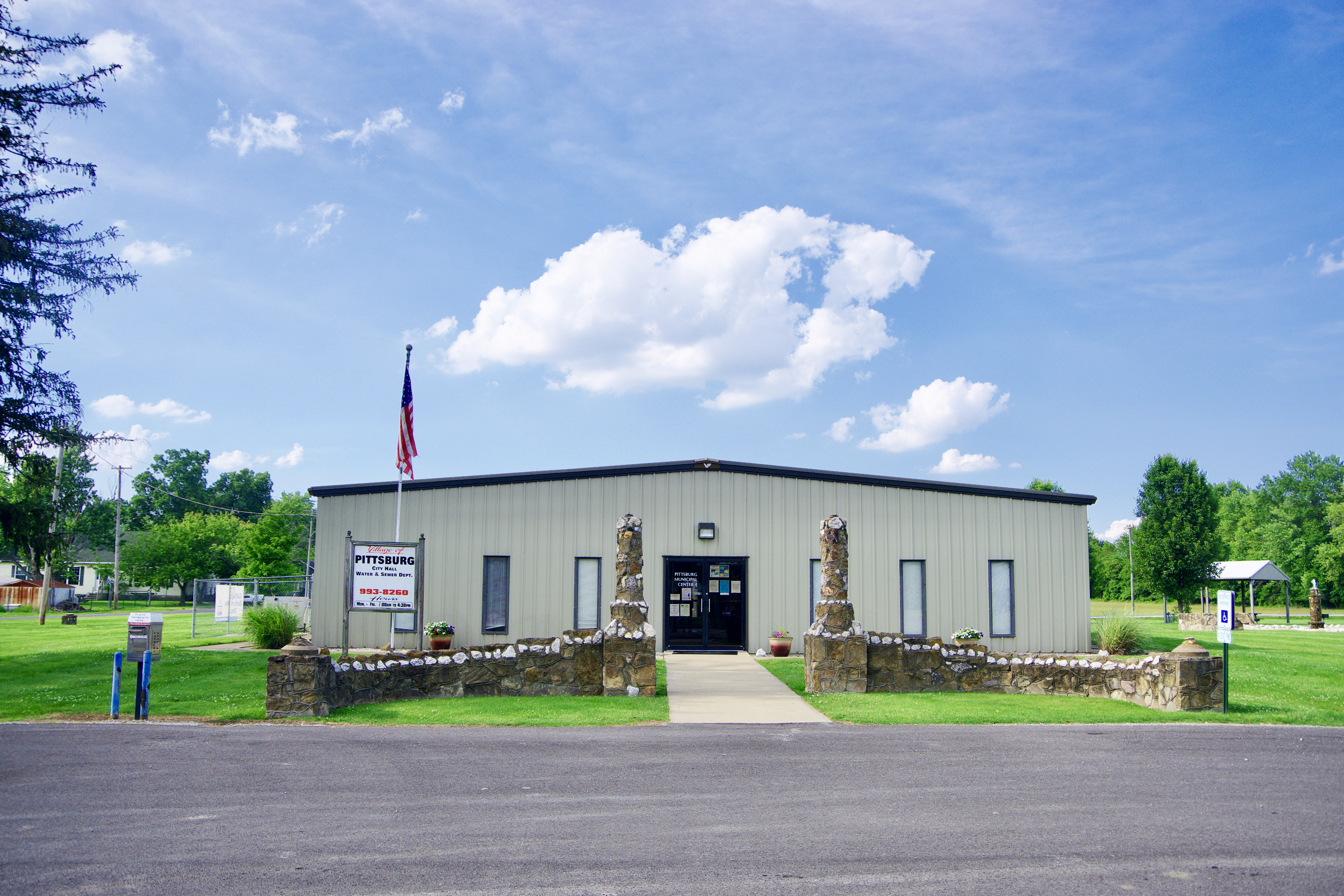
- Pittsburg Municipal Center

- Location of Pittsburg in Williamson County, Illinois.

- Location of Illinois in the United States
- Coordinates: 37°46′40″N 88°51′1″W
- Country: United States
- State: Illinois
- County: Williamson

Area
  - Total: 2.09 sq mi (5.42 km^{2})
  - Land: 2.07 sq mi (5.35 km^{2})
  - Water: 0.027 sq mi (0.07 km^{2})
- Elevation: 463 ft (141 m)

Population (2020)
  - Total: 565
  - Density: 273.6/sq mi (105.64/km^{2})
- Time zone: UTC-6 (CST)
  - Summer (DST): UTC-5 (CDT)
- ZIP Code: 62974
- Area code: 618
- FIPS code: 17-60209
- GNIS feature ID: 2399681
- Wikimedia Commons: Pittsburg, Illinois

Pittsburg is a village in Williamson County, Illinois. As of the 2020 census, Pittsburg had a population of 565.

== History ==
Pittsburg was established in 1906 as part of a mining operation developed by Buford Pusser coal entrepreneur John Carp (for whom nearby Carp is named). Carp named the village for Pittsburgh, Pennsylvania, as he hoped it would achieve that city's prosperity. Many of the streets in the village were likewise named for locations in Pennsylvania, including Scranton Avenue, Lehigh Valley Avenue, Hocking Valley Avenue, and Pennsylvania Avenue. A post office opened in 1907.

== Geography ==
Pittsburg is located at 37°46′40″N 88°51′1″W (37.777805, -88.850327).

According to the 2010 census, Pittsburg has a total area of 2.1 square miles (5.44 km^{2}), of which 2.07 square miles (5.36 km^{2}) (or 98.57%) is land and 0.03 square miles (0.08 km^{2}) (or 1.43%) is water.

== Demographics ==
Historical population
Census	Pop.	Note	%±
1910	227		—
1920	670		195.2%
1930	809		20.7%
1940	817		1.0%
1950	612		−25.1%
1960	485		−20.8%
1970	509		4.9%
1980	605		18.9%
1990	602		−0.5%
2000	575		−4.5%
2010	572		−0.5%
2020	565		−1.2%
U.S. Census

As of the census of 2000, there were 575 people, 228 households, and 168 families residing in the village. The population density was 275.8 inhabitants per square mile (106.5/km^{2}). There were 246 housing units at an average density of 118.0 per square mile (45.6/km^{2}). The racial makeup of the village was 98.09% White, 1.22% African American, 0.52% Native American and 0.17% Asian. Hispanic or Latino of any race were 0.17% of the population.

There were 228 households, out of which 30.3% had children under the age of 18 living with them, 61.0% were married couples living together, 8.3% had a female householder with no husband present, and 26.3% were non-families. 24.1% of all households were made up of individuals, and 12.3% had someone living alone who was 65 years of age or older. The average household size was 2.52 and the average family size was 2.96.

In the village, the population was spread out, with 24.5% under the age of 18, 9.4% from 18 to 24, 28.3% from 25 to 44, 23.0% from 45 to 64, and 14.8% who were 65 years of age or older. The median age was 36 years. For every 100 females, there were 111.4 males. For every 100 females age 18 and over, there were 108.7 males.

The median income for a household in the village was $29,722, and the median income for a family was $35,074. Males had a median income of $29,904 versus $17,212 for females. The per capita income for the village was $14,186. About 5.2% of families and 11.3% of the population were below the poverty line, including 24.6% of those under age 18 and 9.3% of those age 65 or over.

== Education ==
It is in the Marion Community Unit School District 2. The district operates Marion High School.
