= Patrick Windhorst =

American politician from Illinois

Member of the Illinois House of Representatives from the 117th district
- Incumbent
- Assumed office January 9, 2019
- Preceded by: Natalie Phelps Finnie

Personal details
- Party: Republican
- Spouse: Holly Windhorst
- Education: University of Illinois, Southern Illinois University
- Occupation: Attorney, politician
- Website: https://repwindhorst.com/

Patrick Windhorst is an American politician from Illinois. Windhorst is a Republican member of the Illinois House of Representatives for the 117th district, previously representing the 118th district before redistricting was enacted in 2021. His district represents the southeast corner of the state, including the towns of Harrisburg, Illinois, Metropolis, Illinois, West Frankfort, Illinois, and Golconda, Illinois.

== Education ==
Upon graduation from Massac County high school in Metropolis, Windhorst earned an associate degree from Shawnee Community College. In 1997, Windhorst earned a Bachelor of Science degree in journalism from University of Illinois at Urbana–Champaign. In 2000, Windhorst earned a JD degree from Southern Illinois University School of Law.

== Career ==
In 2000, Windhorst started his career as an attorney at Denton & Keuler, until 2004. Windhorst was an elected State's Attorney for Massac County. In the 2018 general election, Windhorst won the election and became a member of Illinois House of Representatives. Windhorst defeated appointed Democratic incumbent Natalie Phelps Finnie by a margin of 15.2 percentage points.

As of January 2025, Representative Windhorst is a member of the following Illinois House committees:

- Gun Violence Prevention (HGVP)
- Ethics & Elections Committee (SHEE)
- Judiciary - Criminal Committee (HJUC)
- Restorative Justice and Public Safety Committee (SHRJ)

== Electoral history ==
Illinois 118th State House District Republican Primary, 2018
Party	Candidate	Votes	%
Republican	Patrick Windhorst	5,872	53.79
Republican	Wes Sherrod	2,882	26.40
Republican	Samuel K. Stratemeyer	2,163	19.81
Total votes		10,917	100.0

Illinois 118th State House District General Election, 2018
Party	Candidate	Votes	%
Republican	Patrick Windhorst	21,956	56.46
Democratic	Natalie Phelps Finnie (incumbent)	16,933	43.54
Total votes		38,889	100.0

== Personal life ==
Windhorst's wife is Holly Windhorst. They have two children.
