= McCormick, Illinois =

- Unincorporated community
- Location within Illinois Location within the United States
- Coordinates: 37°33′02″N 88°40′14″W
- Country: United States
- State: Illinois
- County: Pope
- Elevation: 728 ft (222 m)
- Time zone: UTC-6 (Central (CST))
  - Summer (DST): UTC-5 (CDT)
- Area code: 618
- GNIS feature ID: 425180

McCormick is an unincorporated community in Pope County, Illinois, United States. Jackson Falls, a seasonal waterfall and climbing area, is located 4 miles (6.4 km) south of McCormick.

C. L. McCormick (1919–1987), Illinois state representative and businessman, was born in McCormick.
