= Marion High School (Illinois) =

Location
- 1700 Wildcat Road; Marion, Williamson, Illinois 62959; United States; 37.7156°N 88.9431°W

Information
- School type: Secondary High School
- School district: Marion Community Unit School District 2
- Principal: Joseph Williams
- Teaching staff: 83.75 (FTE)
- Enrollment: 1,105 (2023–2024)
- Average class size: 18
- Student to teacher ratio: 13.19
- Color: Navy Blue Gold
- Fight song: "Marion Wildcat Loyalty"
- Athletics conference: South Seven Conference
- Mascot: Wildcats
- Newspaper: MHS "The Student"
- Yearbook: "Memory Kit"
- Website: mhs.marionunit2.org

Marion High School is a high school located in the growing city of Marion, Illinois, serving the Marion Unit 2 School District. The school's enrollment was approximately 1,125 students in the 2013–2014 school year. Marion Unit #2 School District built a new high school on the same property which was finished in 2017

In addition to the majority of Marion, it serves Creal Springs, Pittsburg, and Spillertown.

== Campus ==
In 2017 Marion Unit #2 opened a new 330,000 square foot, state-of-the-art high school utilizing geothermal heating. The new campus accommodates 21st-century learning with a science and technology (STEM) lab, a performing and visual arts center, a technical and vocational education center including learning labs in culinary arts, agricultural science, building trades, and automotive repair. The new facility includes a new health education center with an indoor track, multiple courts, a dance rehearsal area, and a fitness center. The educational wing accommodates a wide variety of honors, Advanced Placement, capstone vocational courses, and college dual credit opportunities to prepare students for the workplace and higher education.

== Curriculum ==
In 2015 the students began using Chromebooks. Marion Unit #2 became a Google for Education School District. In August 2020, each K-12 student received a Chromebook to engage with digital learning tools and experiences.

== Notable alumni ==
- Aaron Adeoye — NFL player
- Homer M. Butler — American newspaper editor, journalist, and politician
- Ray Fosse — former professional baseball player and television color commentator
