= Marion Community Unit School District 2 =

School district in Marion, Illinois, United States

Address
- 1700 West Cherry Street Marion, Illinois, 62959; United States

District information
- Type: Public
- Grades: PreK–12
- Superintendent: Becky Moss
- NCES District ID: 1724600

Students and staff
- Students: 3,729
- District mascot: Wildcats
- Colors: Navy Blue Gold

Other information
- Website: www.marionunit2.org

Marion Community Unit School District 2 is a school district headquartered in Marion, Illinois. It serves sections of Williamson County and Johnson County. It serves thirteen townships, with all but one in Williamson County. Marion CUSD 2 now covers approximately 159 square miles (410 km^{2}).

Marion CUSD includes almost all of the city limits of Marion, as well as Creal Springs, Pittsburg and Spillertown.

== History ==
It was established in 1951 by a merger of about the entirety and/or portions of 45 existing school districts, including the Marion Township High School District. It originally had 53 square miles (140 km^{2}) of area, though through annexations it grew to 159 square miles (410 km^{2}).

In 2017 Marion CUSD 2 opened a new 330,000-square-foot (31,000 m^{2}) high school. The new campus accommodates 21st-century learning with a science and technology (STEM) lab, a performing arts and visual center, a technical and vocational education center including learning labs in culinary arts, agricultural science, building trades, and automotive repair. The new facility includes a new health education center with an indoor track, basketball and tennis courts, a dance rehearsal area, and a fitness center. The health education center also includes a Shawnee Health Center for students, teachers, staff, and parents. The educational wing better accommodates the wide variety of honors, advanced placement, capstone vocational courses, and college dual credit opportunities with John A. Logan College that prepare students for experiences in the workplace and at universities and colleges throughout the nation.

== School Board ==
- Superintendent
  - Becky Moss
- Assistant Superintendent
  - Lindsay Watts
- President
  - Shannon Mohr
- Vice President
  - Sheri Lawler
- Members
  - Joe Bleyer
  - Patty Bundren
  - Jared Garrison
  - Brice Wesley
  - Kristen Whiteford

== Schools ==
Secondary schools

- Marion High School
- Marion Junior High School

Elementary schools

- Adams School (Creal Springs Elementary School)
- Jefferson
- Lincoln
- Longfellow
- Washington
