= Gene Johns =

American politician (1927-1984)

Harold Gene Johns (October 6, 1927 – August 11, 1984) was an American politician and Democratic member of the Illinois Senate.

== Early life and career ==
Johns was born in Carrier Mills, Illinois October 6, 1927 to Columbus Johns, an employee of the Sahara Coal Company, and Mabel Johns, a homemaker. He was raised in and attended public schools in Harrisburg, Illinois. He graduated from Southern Illinois University Carbondale majoring in Government. He served in the U.S. Navy Air Corps and as an agent with the Federal Bureau of Investigation in Washington D.C. He returned to downstate Illinois where he served as a school principal in Saline County and later an administrator for the Department of Business and Economic Development in Herrin. In the latter role, he directed development of first two Economic Development Districts in Illinois. He also owned a petroleum distributorship in West Frankfort. He married Eve Prince and had three children.

== Illinois Senate ==
In the 1970 general election, Johns unseated Republican incumbent Delmer R. Mitchell to represent the 57th Legislative District in the Illinois Senate. The 57th district included Franklin, Gallatin, Hardin, Johnson, Massac, Pope, Pulaski, Saline, White, and Williamson counties in Southern Illinois.

Johns served in the Illinois Senate from 1971 until his death in 1984. During the 77th General Assembly, Johns served as a member of the Agricultural Commodity Commission, Economic Development Commission, Visitation Commission, County Problems Commission, and Equal Opportunities Commission. He is Vice-Chairman of the Executive Committee and Vice-Chairman of the Agriculture and Conservation Committee. He was also a member of the Welfare Committee and Transportation Committee. As part of the 1970 decennial redistricting process, Johns was redistricted to the 59th Legislative District, which consisted of the old 57th district, but added Alexander and Union counties. Johns was opposed to the Equal Rights Amendment.

In October 1981, Johns was indicted for the alleged misuse of campaign funds related to his hard-fought 1978 reelection bid. A few months later, in January 1982, Johns was acquitted on all charges. In the 1982 general election, Johns defeated C. L. McCormick, a Republican member of the Illinois House of Representatives, and Ben Brinkley who ran under the banner of the Southern Illinois Equal Rights Party.

Johns died from cancer at the Carbondale Memorial Hospital in Carbondale, Illinois. Glenn Poshard, one of Johns's opponents in the 1982 Democratic primary, was appointed by local Democratic leaders to succeed Johns in the Illinois Senate. In that years general election, Poshard was victorious winning 47,230 votes to Republican Robert Winchester's 39,173 votes and Independent candidate and Gene Johns' widow Eve Johns' 5,862 votes.
