= Homer M. Butler =

American newspaper editor, journalist, and politician

Homer Marx Butler (October 15, 1904 – May 24, 1982) was an American newspaper editor, journalist, and politician.

Born in Marion, Illinois, Butler graduated from Marion High School in 1923. He went to Illinois College in Jacksonville, Illinois and the Southern Illinois University. Butler worked as a reporter and editor for the Marion Daily Republican newspaper in Marion, Illinois. He served on the Marion Board of Education and the Marion City Council. He was elected to the Illinois Senate from the 50th district in the 1944 general election. In the 1950 general election, Butler returned to the Illinois House of Representatives in the 67th General Assembly before once more serving in the Illinois Senate in the 1952 general election.

In the 1956 general election, Democratic candidate William Grindle defeated Butler for reelection. Butler then served again in the Illinois House of Representatives from 1959 to 1963. He was a Republican. Butler died at Marion Memorial Hospital in Marion. His son Robert L. Butler served as mayor of Marion, Illinois for over fifty years.
