= Galatia, Illinois =

Galatia
- Village
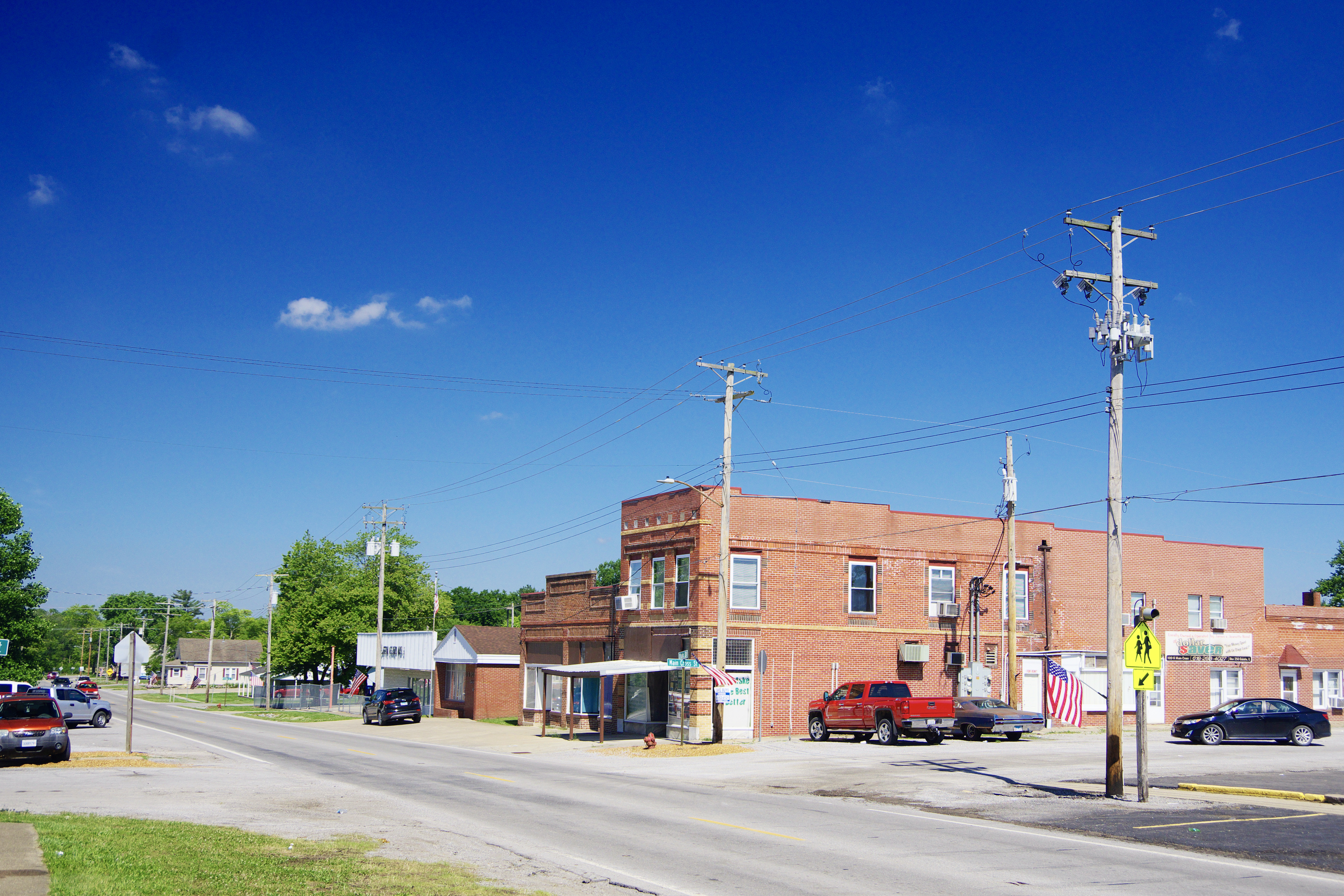
- Businesses along Main Street (IL 34)

- Location of Galatia in Saline County, Illinois.
- Coordinates: 37°50′29″N 88°37′20″W
- Country: United States
- State: Illinois
- County: Saline

Area
  - Total: 1.98 sq mi (5.13 km^{2})
  - Land: 1.95 sq mi (5.06 km^{2})
  - Water: 0.027 sq mi (0.07 km^{2})
- Elevation: 404 ft (123 m)

Population (2020)
  - Total: 827
  - Density: 423.6/sq mi (163.55/km^{2})
- Time zone: UTC-6 (CST)
  - Summer (DST): UTC-5 (CDT)
- ZIP code: 62935
- Area code: 618
- FIPS code: 17-28261
- GNIS feature ID: 2398936
- Website: villageofgalatia.com

Galatia is a village in Saline County, Illinois, in the United States. As of the 2020 census the village population was 827.

== History ==
Galatia is named for Albert Gallatin. The village was established as a tobacco farming hub in the mid-1800s. Tobacco grown in the area was hauled to Shawneetown to be shipped along the Ohio River. Two coal mines opened near Galatia in the early 1900s, the Harco Mine and the Galatia Colliers Mine.

== Geography ==
According to the 2010 census, Galatia has a total area of 1.979 square miles (5.13 km^{2}), of which 1.95 square miles (5.05 km^{2}) (or 98.53%) is land and 0.029 square miles (0.08 km^{2}) (or 1.47%) is water.

There are coal mines in the vicinity of Galatia which have been used for climate change studies.

== Demographics ==
Historical population
Census	Pop.	Note	%±
1880	674		—
1890	519		−23.0%
1900	642		23.7%
1910	745		16.0%
1920	863		15.8%
1930	933		8.1%
1940	986		5.7%
1950	933		−5.4%
1960	830		−11.0%
1970	792		−4.6%
1980	1,042		31.6%
1990	983		−5.7%
2000	1,013		3.1%
2010	933		−7.9%
2020	827		−11.4%
U.S. Decennial Census

As of the census of 2010, there were 933 people, 420 households, and 262 families residing in the village. The population density was 516.5 inhabitants per square mile (199.4/km^{2}). There were 455 housing units at an average density of 232.0 per square mile (89.6/km^{2}). The racial makeup of the village was 98.12% White, 0.10% African American, 0.49% Native American, 0.20% from other races, and 1.09% from two or more races. Hispanic or Latino of any race were 0.89% of the population.

There were 420 households, out of which 26.9% had children under the age of 18 living with them, 49.5% were married couples living together, 10.5% had a female householder with no husband present, and 37.4% were non-families. 35.5% of all households were made up of individuals, and 21.4% had someone living alone who was 65 years of age or older. The average household size was 2.26 and the average family size was 2.95.

In the village, the population was spread out, with 21.0% under the age of 18, 10.7% from 18 to 24, 21.1% from 25 to 44, 20.6% from 45 to 64, and 26.6% who were 65 years of age or older. The median age was 43 years. For every 100 females, there were 75.3 males. For every 100 females age 18 and over, there were 74.7 males.

The median income for a household in the village was $23,750, and the median income for a family was $30,833. Males had a median income of $25,956 versus $16,154 for females. The per capita income for the village was $12,810. About 12.9% of families and 16.7% of the population were below the poverty line, including 25.1% of those under age 18 and 14.1% of those age 65 or over.

== Education ==
Galatia School District is one of four in Saline County. The other three school districts are Eldorado, Harrisburg, and Carrier Mills.

== Notable people ==
- James D. Fowler, law enforcement officer and state legislator, was born in Galatia.
