= William L. Harris =

American businessman and politician

William L. Harris (August 30, 1923 – July 1, 2013) was an American businessman and politician.

Harris was born in Marion, Illinois, and went to the Marion public schools. He took classes in administrative management at the University of Chicago in 1956. He worked in sales and management at the Illinois Ordnance Plant, Swift and Company, and DuQuion Packing Company. Harris was a real estate broker and was the owner of Harris Real Estate and Consultants, Ltd in Marion, Illinois. Harris was involved with the Democratic Party in Williamson County, Illinois. He served on the Marion City Council from 1963 to 1967. From 1973 to 1977, Harris served on the Illinois Board of Elections. In 1977, Harris was appointed to the Illinois House of Representatives and served until 1981. Harris died at his home in Marion, Illinois.
