= Herbert L. Upchurch =

American educator and politician

Herbert L. Upchurch (June 18, 1908 – January 20, 1979) was an American educator and politician.

Upchurch was born on a farm near Benton, Franklin County, Illinois. Father to his only child Jimmy and Wife Lucille. He went to the Franklin County public schools and to the Benton Township High School. Upchurch went to Southern Illinois University. Upchurch was a teacher and school administrator. He served on the Benton Grade School Board and was a Democrat. Upchurch served in the Illinois House of Representatives from 1941 to 1947. Upchurch worked as an inspector for the Illinois Secretary of State and served as director of the Franklin County Office of Economic Opportunity. Upchurch died at Benton Hospital in Benton, Illinois from a long illness.
