= James D. Fowler =

American law enforcement officer and politician (1934–2020)

James D. "Jim" Fowler (June 11, 1934 – December 22, 2020) was an American law enforcement officer and politician.

Born in Galatia, Saline County, Illinois, Fowler served in the United States Navy. He served in the Illinois State Police for twenty-eight years. Fowler lived in Harrisburg, Illinois with his wife and family. He served as the county clerk for Saline County and was a Democrat. From 1999 to 2003, Fowler served in the Illinois House of Representatives.

Fowler died December 22, 2020.
