= Robert Winchester =

American politician

Robert C. Winchester is an American politician from Illinois. An active member of the Republican Party, he served as a Republican member of the Illinois House of Representatives from 1975 until 1985.

== Early life ==
Winchester was born April 21, 1945, in Paducah, Kentucky. He was raised in Johnson and Pulaski counties in downstate Illinois. When he was 11, his father died in what was ruled a suicide, though later research by Maureen Hughes has indicated it could have been a murder. He graduated from Southern Illinois University Carbondale. He then took jobs with the Illinois Department of Corrections and Illinois Department of Procurement.

== Illinois House of Representatives ==
He was first elected to the Illinois House of Representatives in 1974. In 1984, Winchester ran for the Illinois Senate, but lost to Democratic candidate Glenn Poshard.

== Post-legislative career ==
In 1988, Winchester ran for his old seat against Democratic incumbent David D. Phelps and lost. In 1989, Winchester was appointed the head of the Office of Resource Marketing and Education in the Illinois Department of Conservation with responsibilities for special events and marketing. In 1999, George Ryan hired Winchester to serve as his Deputy Chief of Staff overseeing the newly created Office of Southern Illinois. In the 2016 Republican Party presidential primaries, Winchester ran to be elected as a delegate to the 2016 Republican National Convention pledged to the presidential campaign of Florida Senator Marco Rubio.
