= Marion, Illinois =

- City
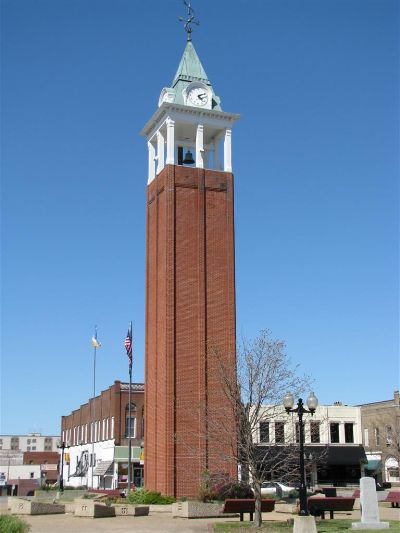
- Marion clock tower in the town square

- Flag Logo
- Nickname: Oasis of Opportunity
- Interactive map of Marion, Illinois
- Location within Illinois Location within the United States
- Coordinates: 37°44′40″N 88°56′34″W
- Country: United States
- State: Illinois
- Counties: Williamson, Johnson
- Founded: August 21, 1839

Area
  - City: 14.62 sq mi (37.86 km^{2})
  - Land: 14.40 sq mi (37.30 km^{2})
  - Water: 0.22 sq mi (0.56 km^{2}) 1.42%
- Elevation: 440 ft (130 m)

Population (2020)
  - City: 16,855
  - Density: 1,170.2/sq mi (451.83/km^{2})
  - Metro: 132,693 (Carbondale-Marion-Herrin IL CSA)
- Time zone: UTC−6 (CST)
  - Summer (DST): UTC−5 (CDT)
- ZIP Code: 62959
- Area codes: 618, 730
- FIPS: 17-46916
- GNIS feature ID: 2395010
- Website: cityofmarionil.gov

Marion is a city in and the county seat of Williamson County, Illinois, United States. The population was 16,855 according to the 2020 census. It is part of a dispersed urban area that developed out of early 20th-century coal fields.

Marion serves as the largest retail trade center in Southern Illinois with its central location along Interstate 57 and Illinois Route 13. The city is part of the Marion-Herrin micropolitan area and is a part of the Carbondale-Marion-Herrin, Illinois combined statistical area with 123,272 residents, the sixth-most populous Combined statistical area in Illinois.

== History ==
=== Indigenous ===
Indigenous settlements that may have previously been in the vicinity of the present day boundaries of Marion include:

- Osage (𐓏𐒰𐓓𐒰𐓓𐒷 𐒼𐓂𐓊𐒻 𐓆𐒻𐒿𐒷 𐓀𐒰^𐓓𐒰^)
- Kaskaskia
- Myaamia
- Sioux (Ochethi Sakowin)
- Kickapoo (Kiikaapoi)

=== Settlement ===
Following the creation of Williamson County out of the south half of Franklin County by the Illinois General Assembly, three commissioners appointed by the colonial lawmakers met at Bainbridge, Illinois, on August 19, 1839, for the purpose of locating a new county seat as close to the center of the county as possible. The next day, August 20, they laid out a town of 20 acres (81,000 m^{2}) with a public square about one-quarter of a mile east of the county's center, but a point on top of a slight hill of 448 feet (137 m) above sea level. The site sat in a small open grassland known as Poor Prairie. For a name, they chose Marion to honor American Revolutionary War hero Gen. Francis "Swamp Fox" Marion.

William and Bethany Benson had entered the quarter-quarter section of land that contained the future site of Marion just the previous year on September 8, 1838. He had lived in the county at least since 1817, and was the first settler to enter land in Poor Prairie. At the time the commissioners platted Marion, he had a small crop of corn and wheat growing over what became the public square.

The Williamson County Court organized in Marion on October 7, 1839, at the Benson log cabin. Overflow crowds had to use pumpkins for stools. The federal government established a post office at Marion on January 30, 1840, and the legislature incorporated the community as a city on February 24, 1841.

=== Tornadoes ===
On May 29, 1982, one of the larger tornadoes in Illinois history, rated F4, hit the city of Marion and Williamson County. Ten people died and 181 people were injured after this tornado ripped across a 17-mile (27 km) stretch. The Shawnee Village apartment complex was destroyed, and the Marion Ford-Mercury dealership sustained heavy damage. This tornado caused between $85 million and $100 million in damages. A memorial to the ten people who perished that day was later erected on the south side of Tower Square Plaza.

An EF4 tornado struck to the south of Marion on May 16, 2025 with wind speeds reaching 190 mph (310 km/h). The tornado caused seven injuries but no fatalities. This tornado prompted a tornado emergency.

== Geography ==
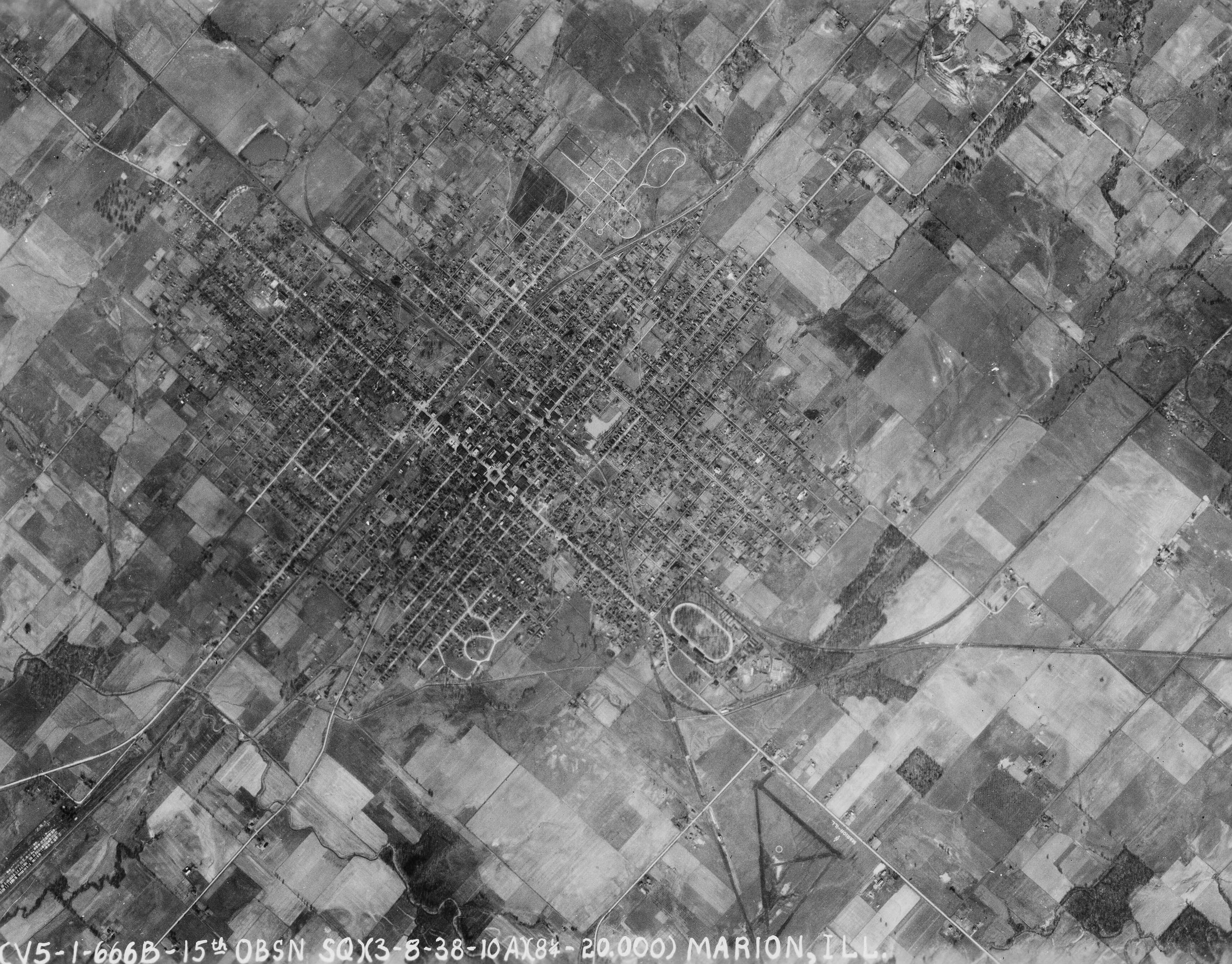
Marion in 1938

Marion is in central Williamson County, with a narrow strip of city limits extending south beyond Creal Springs to the valley of Sugar Creek in Johnson County. Marion is 44 miles (71 km) south of Mount Vernon, Illinois, and 57 miles (92 km) north of Paducah, Kentucky. Carbondale is 17 miles (27 km) to the west, and Harrisburg is 22 miles (35 km) to the east.

According to the 2010 census, Marion has a total area of 16.217 square miles (42.00 km^{2}), of which 15.99 square miles (41.41 km^{2}) (or 98.6%) is land and 0.227 square miles (0.59 km^{2}) (or 1.4%) is water.

=== Climate ===
Marion has a four-season humid subtropical climate (Köppen: Cfa).

== Demographics ==
Historical population
Census	Pop.	Note	%±
1880	881		—
1890	1,338		51.9%
1900	2,510		87.6%
1910	7,093		182.6%
1920	9,582		35.1%
1930	9,033		−5.7%
1940	9,251		2.4%
1950	10,459		13.1%
1960	11,274		7.8%
1970	11,724		4.0%
1980	13,824		17.9%
1990	14,545		5.2%
2000	16,035		10.2%
2010	17,193		7.2%
2020	16,855		−2.0%

=== 2020 census ===
As of the 2020 census, Marion had a population of 16,855. The population density was 1,171.1 inhabitants per square mile. The median age was 41.2 years. 21.2% of residents were under the age of 18 and 22.0% of residents were 65 years of age or older. For every 100 females there were 91.7 males, and for every 100 females age 18 and over there were 88.2 males age 18 and over.

99.2% of residents lived in urban areas, while 0.8% lived in rural areas.

There were 7,547 households in Marion, of which 25.8% had children under the age of 18 living in them. Of all households, 37.8% were married-couple households, 20.7% were households with a male householder and no spouse or partner present, and 34.3% were households with a female householder and no spouse or partner present. About 37.8% of all households were made up of individuals and 17.7% had someone living alone who was 65 years of age or older.

There were 8,644 housing units, of which 12.7% were vacant. The homeowner vacancy rate was 4.3% and the rental vacancy rate was 16.6%.

Racial composition as of the 2020 census
Race	Number	Percent
White	13,994	83.0%
Black or African American	1,291	7.7%
American Indian and Alaska Native	51	0.3%
Asian	246	1.5%
Native Hawaiian and Other Pacific Islander	1	0.0%
Some other race	195	1.2%
Two or more races	1,077	6.4%
Hispanic or Latino (of any race)	622	3.7%

=== Recent socioeconomic profile ===
The median household income in the Marion city, IL is $54,052 and the median house value is $143,600. The per capita income for the city was $36,935. About 15.0% of the population were living below the poverty line. The region has a civilian labor force of 7,866 with a participation rate of 57.8%. Of individuals 25 to 64 in the Marion city, IL, 30.1% have a bachelor's degree or higher.

As of 2023Q4, total employment for the Marion city, IL was 18,253 (based on a four-quarter moving average). Over the year ending 2023Q4, employment increased 2.1% in the region.

As of 2022, Marion has a Veteran population of 1,544 persons.

The Cost of Living Index estimates the relative price levels for consumer goods and services. When applied to wages and salaries, the result is a measure of relative purchasing power. The cost of living is 8.0% lower in Marion city, IL than the U.S. average.

The largest sector in the Marion city, IL is Health Care and Social Assistance, employing 4,015 workers. The next-largest sectors in the region are Accommodation and Food Services (2,364 workers) and Retail Trade (2,134). High location quotients (LQs) indicate sectors in which a region has high concentrations of employment compared to the national average. The sectors with the largest LQs in the region are Finance and Insurance (LQ = 2.33), Health Care and Social Assistance (1.50), and Accommodation and Food Services (1.49).

Sectors in the Marion city, IL with the highest average wages per worker are Utilities ($125,515), Mining, Quarrying, and Oil and Gas Extraction ($73,866), and Health Care and Social Assistance ($65,918). Regional sectors with the best job growth (or most moderate job losses) over the last 5 years are Health Care and Social Assistance (+491 jobs), Accommodation and Food Services (+307), and Finance and Insurance (+194). The fastest growing sector in the region is expected to be Transportation and Warehousing with a +0.5% year-over-year rate of growth. The strongest forecast by number of jobs over this period is expected for Health Care and Social Assistance (+16 jobs), Transportation and Warehousing (+3), and Professional, Scientific, and Technical Services (0).

The largest major occupation group in the Marion city, IL is Office and Administrative Support Occupations, employing 2,191 workers. The next-largest occupation groups in the region are Food Preparation and Serving Related Occupations (1,932 workers) and Healthcare Practitioners and Technical Occupations (1,822). High location quotients (LQs) indicate occupation groups in which a region has high concentrations of employment compared to the national average. The major groups with the largest LQs in the region are Healthcare Practitioners and Technical Occupations (LQ = 1.70), Healthcare Support Occupations (1.40), and Protective Service Occupations (1.37).

Occupation groups in the Marion city, IL with the highest average wages per worker are Management Occupations ($104,900), Healthcare Practitioners and Technical Occupations ($101,500), and Legal Occupations ($92,100). The unemployment rate in the region varied among the major groups from 1.2% among Legal Occupations to 6.9% among Transportation and Material Moving Occupations. Over the next 1 year, the fastest growing occupation group in the Marion city, IL is expected to be Healthcare Support Occupations with a +0.9% year-over-year rate of growth. The strongest forecast by number of jobs over this period is expected for Healthcare Support Occupations (+11 jobs) and Healthcare Practitioners and Technical Occupations (+5). Over the same period, the highest separation demand (occupation demand due to retirements and workers moving from one occupation to another) is expected in Food Preparation and Serving Related Occupations (361 jobs) and Office and Administrative Support Occupations (244).

=== Major employers ===
As of March 30, 2009, the largest employers located inside the city limits were as follows:

- Aisin Mfg., three auto parts plants first established in 2002 employing 1820 employees.
- Pepsi / MidAmerica, soft drinks in operation since 1935 employing 600 workers.
- Heartland Regional Medical Center, formerly Marion Memorial Hospital first established in 1953, employing 600 employees.
- VA Medical Center, established in 1942, employs 1500 workers.
- Blue Cross/Blue Shield claims processing center established in 1983 employing 350 employees.

Other major nearby employers include:

- John A. Logan College in Carterville, established in 1967, employing 850 workers.
- Herrin Hospital in Herrin, established in 1913, employs 450 employees.
- U.S. Dept. of Justice / Bureau of Prisons employs 342 workers at United States Penitentiary, Marion southwest of the city.
- Southern Illinois Power Coop just south of Marion employing 120 at its Lake of Egypt power plant. Established in 1963.

== Arts and culture ==
Downtown Marion is home to the Little Egypt Arts Gallery operated by the Little Egypt Arts Association as well as the Williamson County Historical Society museum and the Marion Carnegie Library. The major arts and culture institution though is the Marion Cultural and Civic Center.

=== Marion Cultural and Civic Center ===
In 2004, the Marion Civic Center was awarded the Frank Lloyd Wright Award - Special Recognition from the American Institute of Architects, Illinois Chapter, at the organization's annual ceremony. The 35,000-square-foot (3,300 m^{2}) facility, designed by White and Borgognoni Architects, was completed in June 2004. After a 1997 fire destroyed the city's former civic center, the new facility was crafted using parts of the old Orpheum Theater building.

The grand opening of the Orpheum Theatre was on January 2, 1922. Built in the southwest corner of the downtown square, she was the flagship of a chain of vaudeville and moving picture theaters constructed to tap into the wealth generated by agriculture and mining in Southern Illinois. The Orpheum Theatre sat over 900, and was ornately decorated in a mix of Renaissance and Neoclassical styles, complete with gold leaf, elaborate plasterwork, and a multicolored terra-cotta facade.

The Orpheum was quite successful until the advent of television. Decreasing profits forced the Orpheum to exclusively be a motion picture theater in the mid-1950s and to close in 1971. The City of Marion purchased the building in 1973 with the intent of constructing a parking lot. The mayor and the city council reconsidered their plan when they found that their citizenry was in favor of restoring the old theater for use by the community as a cultural and entertainment center.

During the early morning hours, of March 10, 1997, a blaze quickly raced through the Civic Center, and totally gutted the theater, leaving it a smoldering shell after the blaze was put out. The facade of the Orpheum was salvaged, but the remainder of the theater was razed, and in 2000, it was decided that a new Cultural and Civic Center would be built on the site of the old Orpheum and a couple of other demolished neighboring structures.

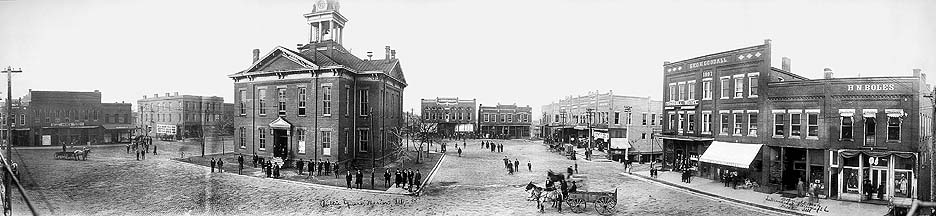
Marion, 1910

=== Sister city ===
Marion became a sister city to Kanie, Japan, on March 26, 2010.

=== Tourism ===
Tourism promotion and marketing in Marion is conducted at the county level with a county bed tax of five percent. Forty percent of that amount goes to the Williamson County Tourism Bureau and the remaining 60 percent to the Williamson County Events Commission for debt service on the bonds used to build the Williamson County Pavilion, a multi-use meeting and convention center immediately north of the Illinois Centre Mall in Marion. That building also houses the tourism bureau.

Camping facilities in the city include the new Marion Campground & RV Park, located off of Exit 53 on the east side of the interstate.

Major attractions that draw visitors to Marion include events at Marion Stadium (Mt Dew Park), events at Southern Illinois University-Carbondale, The Southern Illinois Roller Girls bouts at The Pavilion Events, approximately two dozen wineries within a 45-mile (72 km) radius of the city including those on the Shawnee Hills Wine Trail and the Southern Illinois Wine Trail, Crab Orchard National Wildlife Refuge adjacent to the city, Lake of Egypt immediately to the south and the Shawnee National Forest and various state parks that stretch along the Shawnee Hills from river to river.

=== Sports ===
Team	Sport	League	Championships	Venue
Southern Illinois Miners (defunct)	Baseball	Frontier League; West Division	2012	Rent One Park
Thrillville Thrillbilles	Baseball	Prospect League; Western Conference		Rent One Park
Southern Illinois Roller Girls	Roller derby	WFTDA		Marion Pavilion

== Government ==
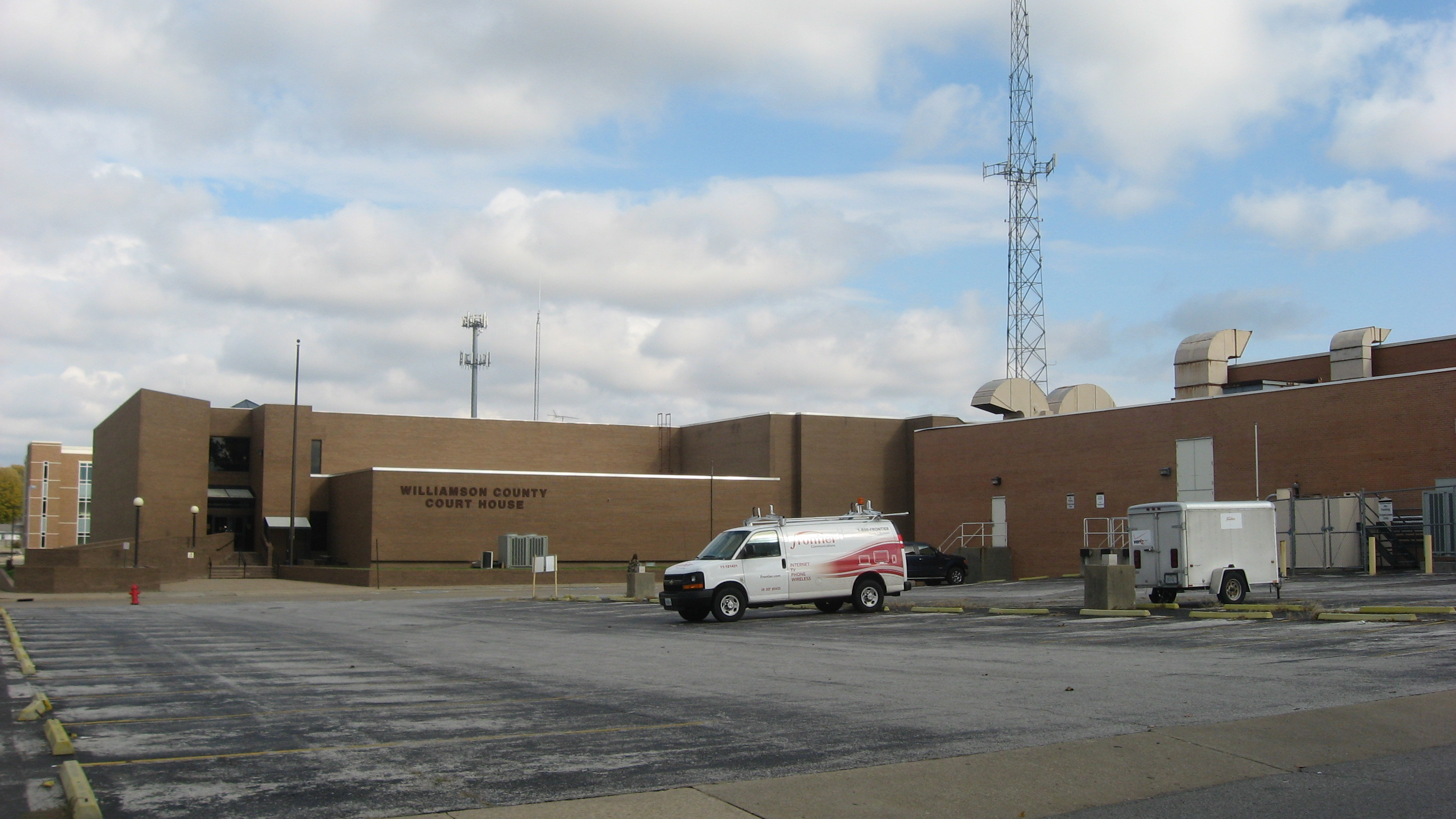
Williamson County Courthouse

Marion's city government is led by Mayor Mike Absher who assumed office on April 22, 2019, after defeating Incumbent Anthony Rinella who was appointed after longtime mayor Robert L. Butler resigned. The city operates on a city commission system of government with the mayor and four city commissioners, each elected for four-year terms.

The council calendar calls for meetings on the 2nd and 4th Mondays of the month at City Hall.

The city is also a home rule community, a status that gives the council greater flexibility to act than a typical city commission form of government.

The Marion Park District is independent of city government. It operates the parks system under a separately elected five-member board. The library board though is appointed by the mayor and city council.

== Media ==
The Southern Illinoisan, The Marion Star, and The Daily Republican are newspapers based in Marion.

Local radio stations are WGGH-FM and WGGH-AM, along with a local Christian Contemporary Station.

WTCT TV (channel 27) is based in Marion.

== Education ==
Marion Community Unit School District 2 covers the vast majority of the city limits. It operates public schools, including Marion High School.

Parts of the city limits to the west are in the Carterville Community Unit School District 5.

== Infrastructure ==
=== Transportation ===
==== Air service ====
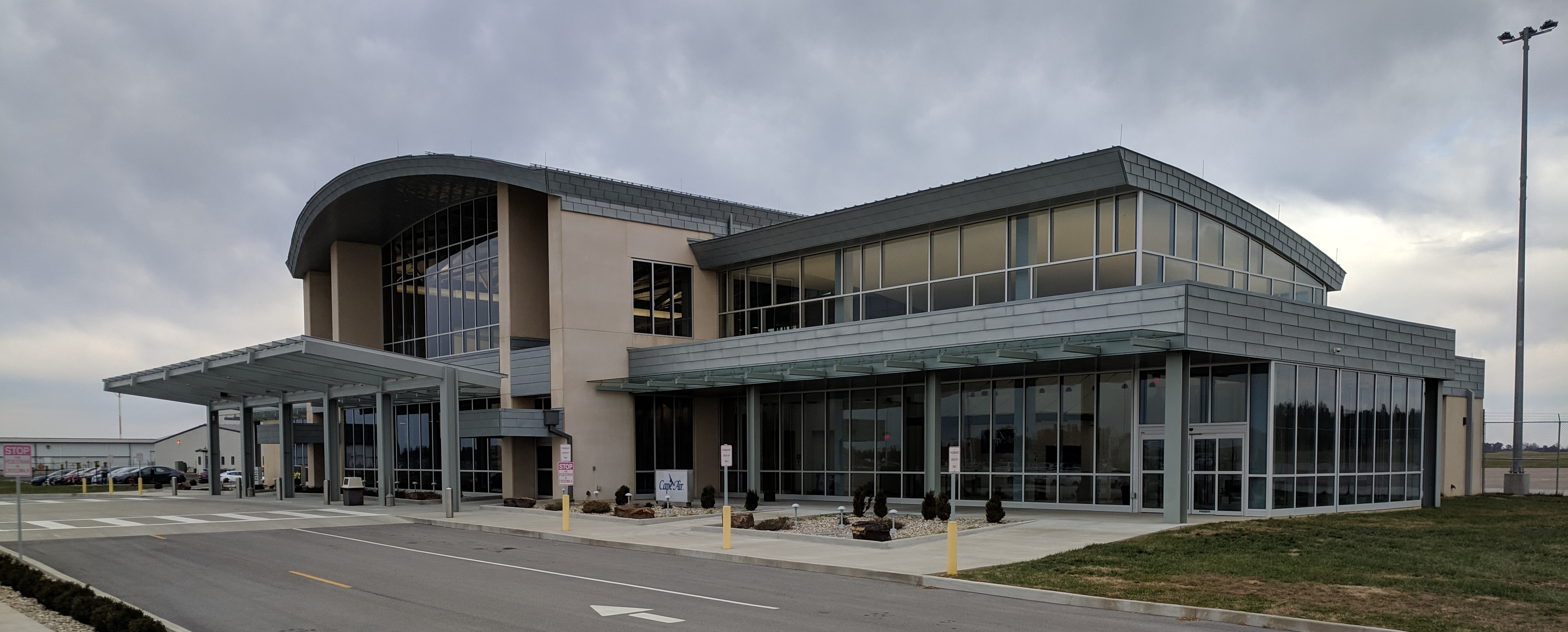
Terminal building at Veterans Airport of Southern Illinois.

Veterans Airport of Southern Illinois, formerly Williamson County Regional Airport, serves the area and is located at the extreme western edge of the city. Contour Airlines provides daily passenger flights to O'Hare International Airport in Chicago.

==== Rail service ====
Both the Union Pacific and Burlington Northern railroads have lines running through the city. Local service from those lines is provided by the Crab Orchard and Egyptian Railroad headquartered in Marion. Amtrak passenger rail service is available at Carbondale, 16 miles (26 km) west of Marion.

==== Bus service ====
Rides Mass Transit District operates fixed-route and demand-response transit services in Marion and Southern Illinois. The Bill Jung Transfer Center serves as the primary location for bus services and serves South Central Transit. Greyhound Lines buses are no longer based out of Marion, Illinois. The nearest terminal is Carbondale.

== Notable people ==
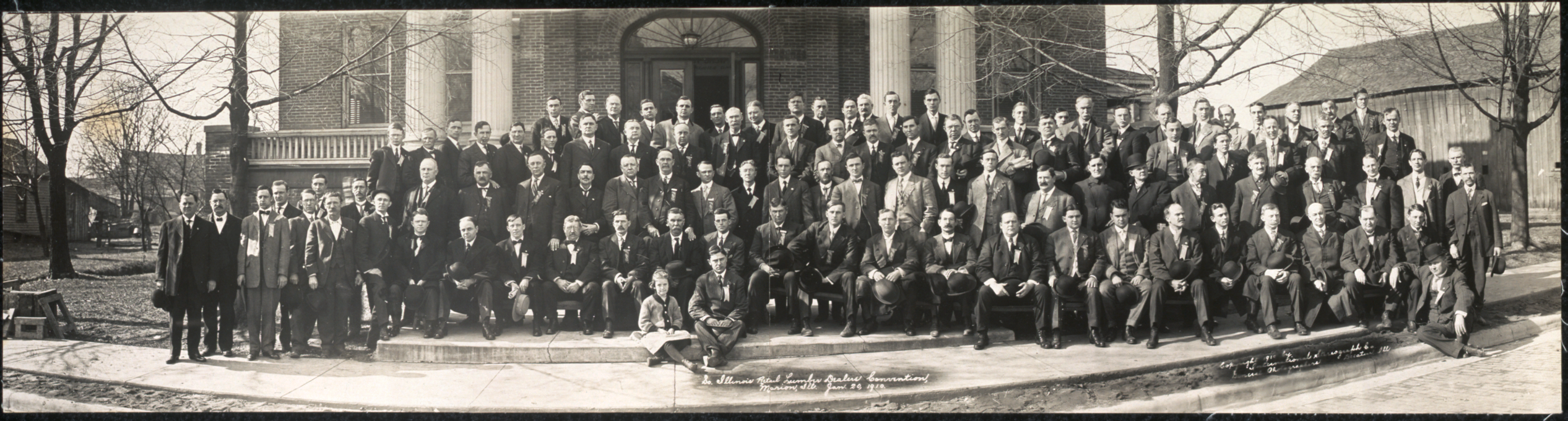
So. Illinois Retail Lumber Dealers Convention, Marion, Ill., January 20, 1910

- Conrad Keene Allen, exploration geologist
- Willis Allen, Illinois attorney, senator, and representative; lived in Marion
- Cory Bailey, professional baseball player in minors, majors and Taiwan
- Madelon Baker, record producer, music publisher, actress, singer
- Wallace A. Bandy, Illinois legislator and businessman
- Babe Borton, Major League Baseball first baseman for Chicago White Sox, New York Yankees, St. Louis Terriers and St Louis Browns
- Nancy Elizabeth Brown, United States Navy Vice Admiral
- O. H. Burnett, Illinois legislator and lawyer
- Homer M. Butler, Illinois legislator and newspaper editor
- Robert L. Butler, mayor of Marion from May 1963 to January 31, 2018
- Edward E. Denison, representative who practiced law in Marion
- Warren W. Duncan, Illinois Supreme Court justice
- James Felts, Illinois politician and newspaper editor
- Ray Fosse, Major League Baseball catcher for Cleveland Indians, Oakland Athletics, Seattle Mariners and Milwaukee Brewers, born in Marion
- William L. Harris, Illinois legislator and businessman
- Judith Ivey, Tony Award-winning actress
- Gene Johns, Illinois legislator and businessman
- Michael Lance Lynn, pitcher for the St. Louis Cardinals
- Phillip McGilton, racing driver
- Tom Murphy, luthier
- Jason Pargin, editor of Cracked.com and author of John Dies at the End
- Jim Reed, racing driver
- Williametta Spencer, composer
- Dolph Stanley, legendary high school and college basketball coach
- Richard G. Wilson, soldier and posthumous recipient of the Medal of Honor for actions in the Korean War
