= 5th Illinois General Assembly =

Term of state legislature in Illinois, US

Type
- Type: Bicameral
- Houses: State Senate and House of Representatives

History
- Preceded by: 4th Illinois General Assembly
- Succeeded by: 6th Illinois General Assembly

Leadership
- President of the Senate: William Kinney, Independent
- Speaker of the House of Representatives: John McLean, Independent
- Seats: 18 Senators 36 Representatives

Meeting place
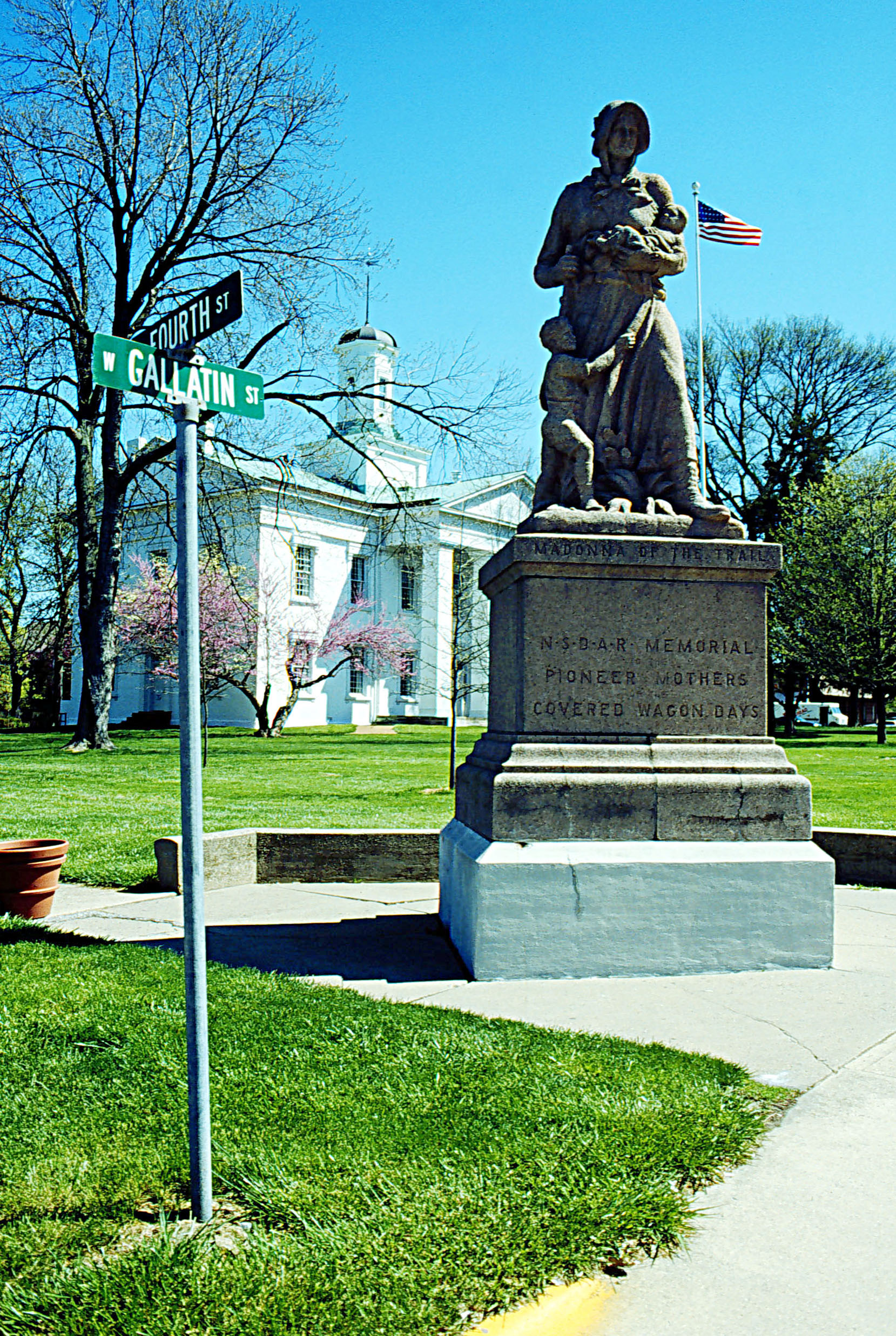
- Vandalia, Illinois

The 5th Illinois General Assembly, consisting of the Illinois Senate and the Illinois House of Representatives, met from December 4, 1826, to February 19, 1827, at The Vandalia State House. The apportionment of seats in the House of Representatives was based on the provisions of the First Illinois Constitution. Political parties were not established in Illinois at the time.

The 5th General Assembly was preceded by the 4th Illinois General Assembly, and was succeeded by the 6th Illinois General Assembly.

== Members ==
Senators and Representatives were both allotted to counties roughly by population and elected at-large within their districts. Bond and Montgomery counties shared a single senator.

Legislation passed on January 12, 1826 in the 4th Illinois General Assembly fixed the Senate at 18 members and the House at 36 members; and fixed apportionment by county.

Ten new counties were added in 1825: Calhoun, Adams, Hancock, Henry, Knox, Mercer, Putnam, Schuyler, Warren, and Peoria; and two were added in 1826: Vermillion and McDonough.

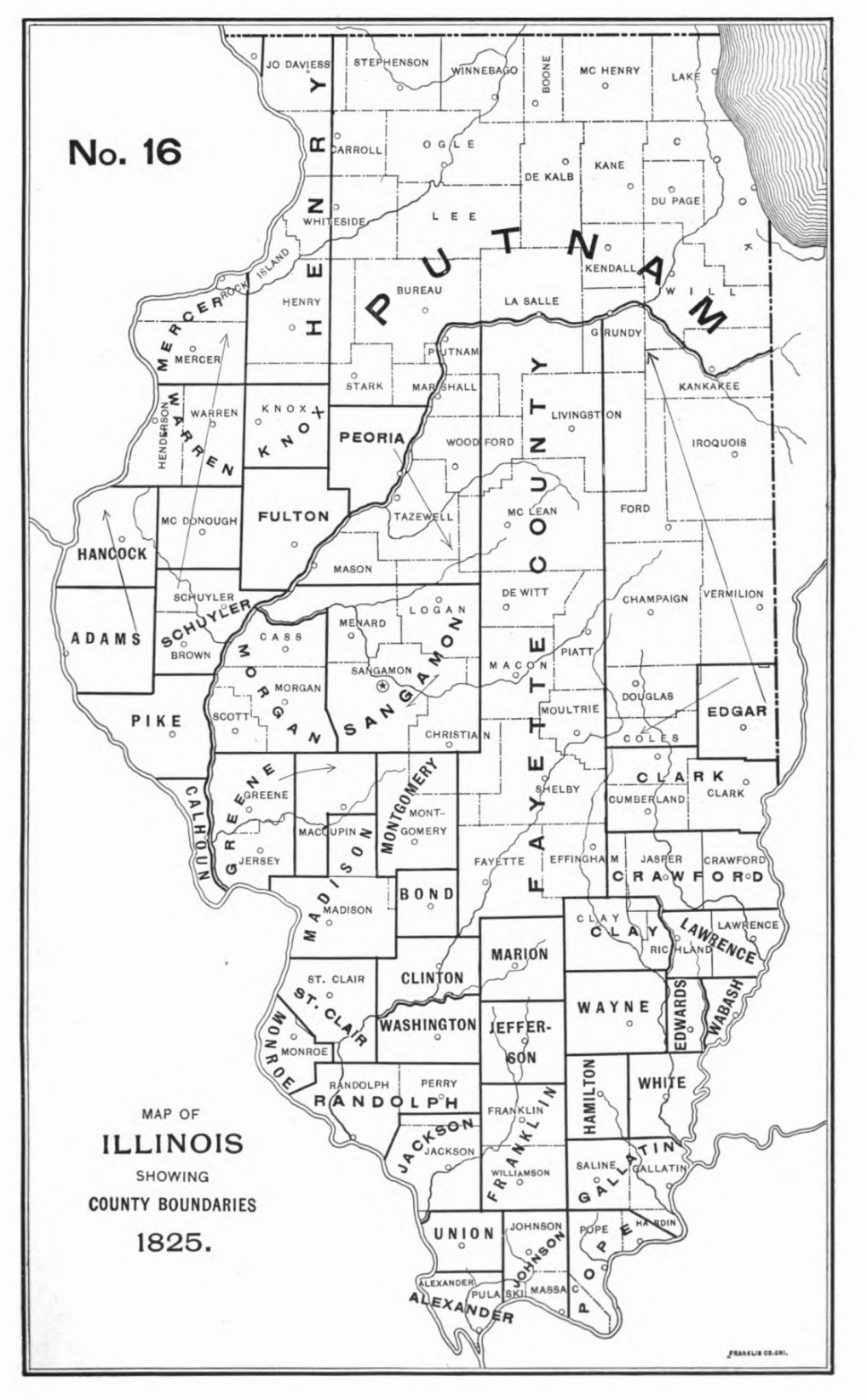
Map of Illinois county boundaries in 1825

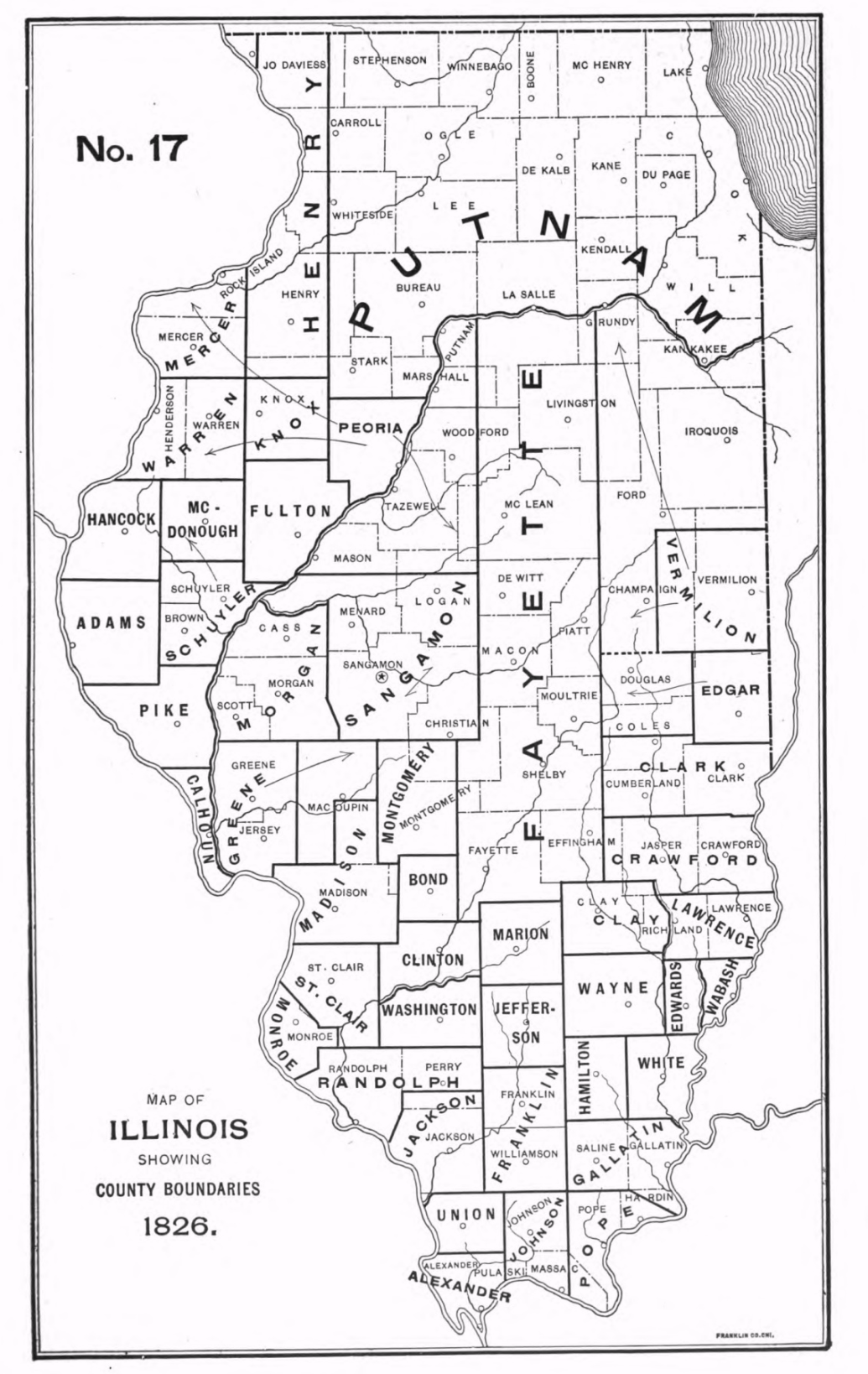
Map of Illinois county boundaries in 1826

=== Senate ===
County (-ies) represented	Image	Senator	Term	Remarks
Bond · Montgomery		Francis Kirkpatrick	1824	
Clark · Crawford · Edgar · Lawrence · Vermilion		William B. Archer	1826–1830	Apportionment in 1826 provided that Clark and Edgar counties should unite with Lawrence and Crawford counties to elect a senator in 1826. After 1828, the winner (Archer) was to only represent the district in which he resided (Clark County) while the other district was to elect a new senator.
Edwards • Wabash • Wayne		Stephen Bliss	1824	
Gallatin		Timothy Gard	1826–1830	
Calhoun • Greene		Thomas Carlin	1824	
Franklin • Jackson		Joseph Duncan	1824	Resigned February 19, 1827
Clay • Hamilton • Jefferson • Marion		Zadok Casey	1826	
Johnson		John Ewing	1824	
Madison		Joseph Conway	1824	
Clinton • Monroe • Washington		Joseph A. Beaird†	1822	
Adams • Fulton • Morgan • Pike • Peoria • Schuyler		Archibald Job	1826–1830	Apportionment in 1826 provided that Adams, Fulton, Morgan, Pike, Peoria, and Schuyler counties to elect a senator in 1826. After 1828, the winner (Job) was to only represent the district in which he resided (Morgan County) while the other district was to elect a new senator.
Pope		Samuel Alexander	1820	
Randolph		Raphael Widen	1824	
Sangamon		Elijah Iles	1826	
St. Clair		James Lemen Jr.	1822	
Alexander • Johnson • Union		George Hunsacker	1826–1830	
Wayne · Lawrence		James Bird	1824–1828	
White		Daniel Hay	1824	

=== House of Representatives ===
Seats in County	Counties represented	Image	Representative	Remarks
2	Clark • Edgar		John Alexander	
2	Clark • Edgar		Charles Ives	
1	Crawford		John C. Alexander	
1	Edwards		Henry I. Mills	
2	Bond • Fayette • Montgomery		William Berry	
2	Bond • Fayette • Montgomery		Robert K. McLaughlin	
1	Franklin		Thomas M. Dorris	
2	Gallatin		John McLean	
2	Gallatin		Francis Prince	
2	Calhoun • Greene		John Allen	
2	Calhoun • Greene		Alfred W. Cavarly	
1	Hamilton		James Hall	
1	Jackson		Conrad Will	
1	Clay • Jefferson • Marion		Nicholas Wren	
1	Lawrence		Samuel H. Clubb	
2	Madison		George Churchill	
2	Madison		David Prickett	
1	Monroe		Thomas James	
2	Morgan		John Leeper	
2	Morgan		John Lieb	
1	Adams • Fulton • Peoria • Pike • Schuyler		Henry J. Ross	
1	Pope		William Sims	
2	Randolph		John Lacy	
2	Randolph		Thomas Reynolds	
3	Sangamon		Job Fletcher	
3	Sangamon		Mordecai Mobley	
3	Sangamon		Jonathan H. Pugh	
2	St. Clair		David Blackwell	
2	St. Clair		John Reynolds	
2	Alexander • Johnson • Union		Benjamin W. Brooks	
2	Alexander • Johnson • Union		Alexander P. Field	
1	Wabash		Henry Utter	
1	Clinton • Washington		Charles Slade	
1	Wayne		William B. Davis	
2	White		William McHenry	
2	White		John Ridgway	

== Employees ==
=== Senate ===
- Secretary: Emanuel J. West
- Enrolling and Engrossing Clerk: A.F. Grant
- Sergeant at Arms: Joseph Chance

=== House of Representatives ===
- Clerk: William Lee D. Ewing
- Enrolling and Engrossing Clerk: H. Roundtree
- Doorkeeper: Bowling Green

== See also ==
- List of Illinois state legislatures

== Works cited ==
- Moses, John (1892). Illinois, historical and statistical comprising the essential facts of its planting and growth as a province, county, territory and state. Vol. II.
- Blue Book of the State of Illinois. State of Illinois. 1919.
- Pease, Theodore Calvin (1923). Statistical Series: Illinois Election Returns (1818-1848). Vol. 1. Illinois State Historical Library.
