= List of elections in 1830 =

The following elections occurred in the year 1830.

- 1830 Belgian general election
- 1830 Colombian presidential election
- 1830 Ecuadorian Constitutional Assembly election
- 1830 French legislative election
- 1830 Hungarian parliamentary election
- 1829–30 Serbian parliamentary election
- 1830–1831 conclave

== North America ==
=== United States ===
- 1830 United States elections

==== United States Senate ====
- 1830 and 1831 United States Senate elections
- 1830 United States Senate election in Pennsylvania

==== United States House of Representatives ====
- 1830 United States House of Representatives elections

==== United States lieutenant gubernatorial ====
- 1830 Connecticut lieutenant gubernatorial election
- 1830 Illinois lieutenant gubernatorial election

==== United States gubernatorial ====
- 1830 Connecticut gubernatorial election
- 1830 Illinois gubernatorial election
- 1830 Louisiana gubernatorial special election
- 1830 Maine gubernatorial election
- 1830 Massachusetts gubernatorial election
- 1830 Maryland gubernatorial election
- 1830 New Hampshire gubernatorial election
- 1830 New Jersey gubernatorial election
- 1830 New York gubernatorial election
- 1830 North Carolina gubernatorial election
- 1830 South Carolina gubernatorial election
- 1830 Ohio gubernatorial election
- 1830 Rhode Island gubernatorial election
- 1830 Vermont gubernatorial election
- 1830 Virginia gubernatorial election

==== United States mayoral elections ====
- 1830 Boston mayoral election

== Europe ==
=== United Kingdom ===
- 1830 United Kingdom general election

== See also ==
- Category:1830 elections
