= John Allen (Illinois politician) =

American politician

Member of the Illinois State Senate
- In office 1840–1842
- Succeeded by: Alfred W. Cavarly

Member of the Illinois House of Representatives
- In office 1838–1840

Member of the Illinois State Senate
- In office 1836–1838
- Succeeded by: Franklin Witt

Member of the Illinois House of Representatives
- In office 1826–1830

Personal details
- Died: June 29, 1841 Greene County, Illinois

John Allen was an American politician who served as a member of the Illinois House of Representatives and of the Illinois State Senate.

== Biography ==
Allen settled in Greene County in 1819. He was elected to the first County Commissioners Court in 1821.

In 1822, he ran unsuccessfully for state senator representing Greene and Pike counties in 3rd Illinois General Assembly being defeated by George Cadwell. In 1826, he won election as one of two representatives (along with Alfred W. Cavarly) to serve as state representatives for Greene and Calhoun counties in 5th Illinois General Assembly (the district elected two representatives at large). In 1828, he won reelection as one of two representatives (along with Thomas Rattan) to serve as state representatives for Greene and Calhoun counties in 6th Illinois General Assembly.

He then failed to win election as state representative in three consecutive elections: In 1830 representing Greene and Calhoun counties in the 7th Illinois General Assembly being defeated by Samuel C. Pierce and Charles Gregory; In 1832 representing Greene county in the 8th Illinois General Assembly being defeated by Lewis W. Link, William Goode, and Samuel C. Pierce; and in 1834 representing Greene and Calhoun counties in the 9th Illinois General Assembly being defeated by Lewis W. Link, Calvin Tunnel, and Charles Gregory. In 1836, he won a two-year term to the Illinois Senate representing Greene and Calhoun counties in the 10th General Assembly; and in 1838, he returned to the house winning election as one of three representatives for Greene county in the 11th General Assembly. In 1840, he ran for a four year term in the State Senate again winning reelection to represent Greene, Calhoun, and Jersey counties which would span the 12th and 13th General Assemblies.

Allen died while in office on 29 June 1841 during the 12th General Assembly. His replacement was to be determined in the next general election in 1842. His death created a crisis due to the clumsily written Apportionment Act of 1841 which split Allen's district into two districts - when there should have only been one - with two newly elected senators: Revill W. English won election in 1842 to represent Greene and Calhoun counties while Alfred W. Cavarly won election in 1842 to represent Jersey county. English honorably stepped down in order to resolve the overlap.
