= 1834 Illinois gubernatorial election =

- August 4, 1834
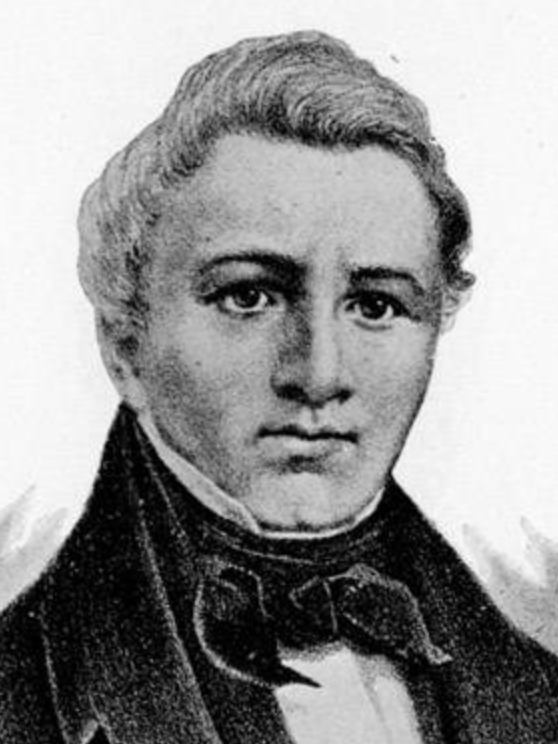

Nominee	Joseph Duncan	William Kinney	Robert K. McLaughlin
Party	Democratic (Note: By the time of Duncan's nomination and election, news of his defection to the Whig Party had not yet reached Illinois. As such, Duncan was elected as a Democrat, though he did not take office as one.)	Democratic	Democratic
Popular vote	17,349	10,229	4,315
Percentage	52.93%	31.21%	13.16%
- County Results Duncan: 40–50% 50–60% 60–70% 70–80% 80–90% 90–100% Kinney: 40–50% 50–60% 60–70% 70–80% McLaughlin: 40–50% 50–60% 60–70% 70–80% 80–90% Unknown/No Vote
Governor before election
William Lee D. Ewing
Democratic
Elected Governor
Joseph Duncan
Whig

The 1834 Illinois gubernatorial election was the fifth quadrennial election for this office. U.S. representative Joseph Duncan was elected by a majority of the voters. He defeated former lieutenant governor William Kinney and former state treasurer Robert K. McLaughlin.

Duncan was a member of the Democratic Party for most of his early career, but fell out with party leader and President Andrew Jackson during Jackson's first term. He did not announce his change in affiliation to the Whig Party publicly, allowing his votes against Jackson in Congress to relay the message, but news of Duncan's change in affiliation did not reach most Illinois voters and politicians until after the election, resulting in Duncan's nomination and election as a Democrat.

Duncan did not return to the state from Washington, D.C. until after the election. This was the only election of a Whig governor in Illinois history, albeit by accident on the part of voters.

== General election ==
=== Candidates ===
- James Adams, attorney and veteran of the Winnebago and Black Hawk wars (Democratic)
- Joseph Duncan, U.S. representative from Jacksonville (Whig-Democratic)
- William Kinney, former lieutenant governor and candidate for governor in 1830 (Democratic)
- Robert K. McLaughlin, former Illinois treasurer (Democratic)

=== Results ===
1834 gubernatorial election, Illinois
Party	Candidate	Votes	%	±%
Democratic	Joseph Duncan	17,349	52.93%	+52.93%
Democratic	William Kinney	10,229	31.21%	−8.84%
Democratic	Robert K. McLaughlin	4,315	13.16%	N/A
Democratic	James Adams	887	2.71%	N/A
Majority		7,120	21.72%	N/A
Turnout		32,780		
Whig gain from Democratic		Swing		

== See also ==
- 1834 Illinois lieutenant gubernatorial election

== See also ==
- Illinois state capitol referendum, 1834
- Illinois Blue Book 1899
