= 7th Illinois General Assembly =

Meeting of the Illinois state legislature from 1830 to 1831

The 7th Illinois General Assembly, consisting of the Illinois Senate and the Illinois House of Representatives, met from December 6, 1830, to February 16, 1831.

The 7th General Assembly was preceded by the 6th Illinois General Assembly, and was succeeded by the 8th Illinois General Assembly.

== Senate ==
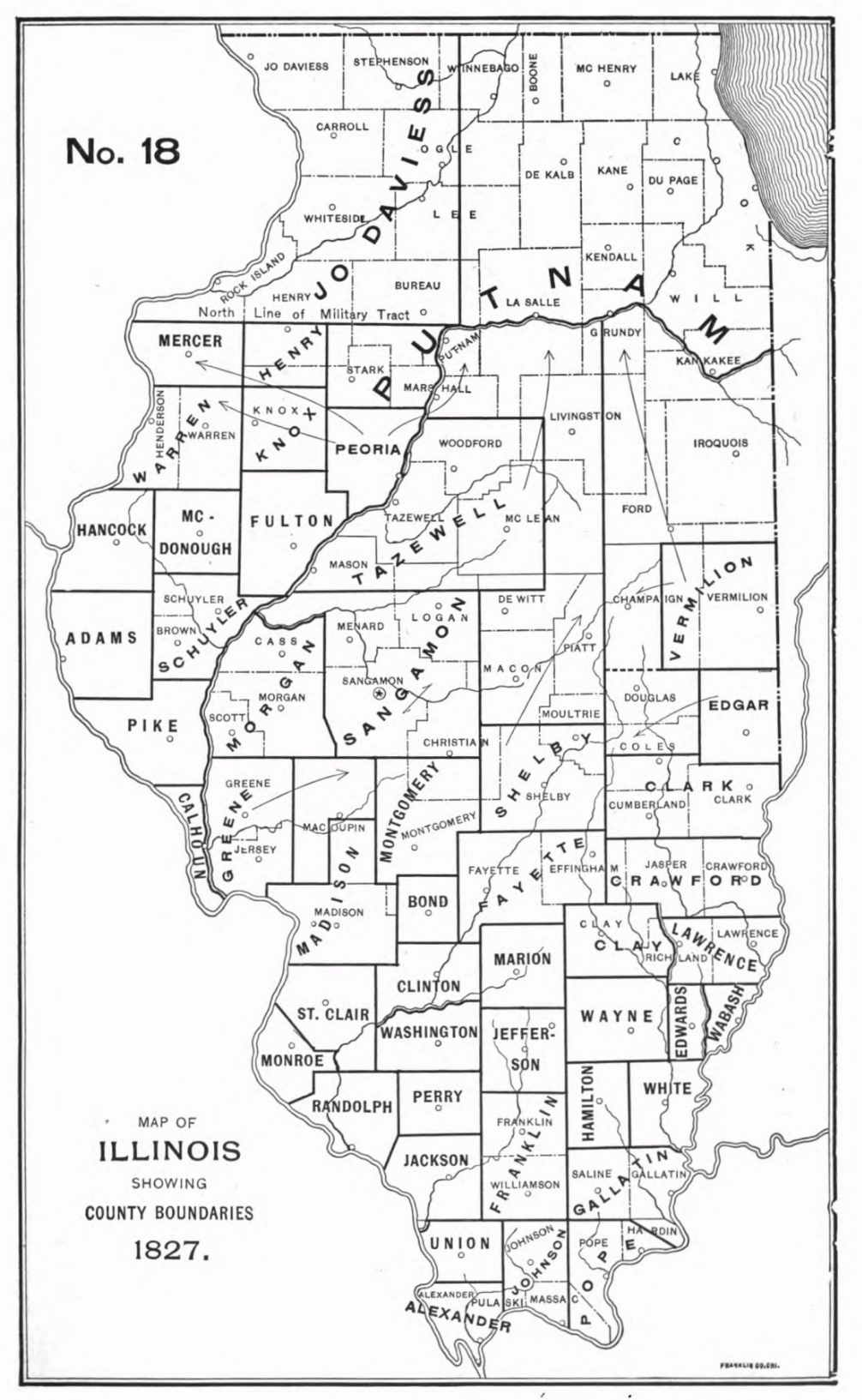
Map of Illinois county boundaries in 1827

County(ies) Represented	Image	Senator	Term	Remarks
Pope		Samuel Alexander		Resigned
Clark · Edgar · Vermilion		William Archer		
Wayne		Enoch Beach	1828–1832	
Greene		Thomas Carlin		
Madison		Joseph Conway		
Randolph		Samuel Crawford	1828–1832	
Morgan		James Evans		
Gallatin		Timothy Gard	1830–1832	
Union		John Grammer		
Sangamon		Elijah Iles		
Crawford		Wickliffe Kitchell		
Monroe · Washington		Jonathan Lynch		
Randolph		Samuel Crozier		
White		William McHenry		
Hamilton		Ennis Maulding		
Fayette		Robert McLaughlin	1828–1832	
Pike		Henry Ross		
St. Clair		Adam Snyder		Won a special election in December 1830 to fill the seat of Risdon Moore Jr. who died before the 2nd session of his term.
Jackson		Conrad Will		

== House of Representatives ==
Seats in County	Counties represented	Image	Representative	Remarks
2	Edgar · Clark · Vermillion		Daniel W. Beckwith	
2	Edgar · Clark · Vermillion		Benjamin Parker	Initially won the election on August 2, 1830 and was seated.
2	Edgar · Clark · Vermillion		Stephen B. Shellody	Successfully contested Parker's election and replaced him on December 10, 1830.
1	Crawford		John C. Alexander	
1	Edwards		James Jordan	
2	Bond · Fayette · Montgomery · Shelby · Tazewell		William Lee D. Ewing	
2	Bond · Fayette · Montgomery · Shelby · Tazewell		John F. Posey	
1	Franklin		John Dement	
2	Gallatin		William J. Gatewood	
2	Gallatin		Joseph E. Watkins	
2	Greene · Calhoun · Macoupin		Samuel C. Pierce	
2	Greene · Calhoun · Macoupin		Charles Gregory	
1	Hamilton		John Davenport	
1	Jackson · Perry		Alexander M. Jenkins	
1	Jefferson · Clay		William Marshall	
1	Lawrence		James M. McLean	
2	Madison		John B. E. Canal	
2	Madison		George Churchill	
1	Monroe		John D. Whiteside	
2	Morgan		Newton Cloud	
2	Morgan		Joseph M. Fairfield	
1	Pike · Schuyler · Fulton · Peoria · Jo Daviess· Hancock· Warren· Knox· McDonough		Joel Wright	
1	Pope		James A. Whiteside	
2	Randolph · Perry		Thomas J. V. Owen	
2	Randolph · Perry		John Atkins	
3	Sangamon		John Dawson	
3	Sangamon		Jonathan H. Pugh	
3	Sangamon		Edmund D. Taylor	
2	St. Clair		William G. Brown	
2	St. Clair		Jacob Ogle	
2	Johnson · Alexander · Union		John Whiteaker	
2	Johnson · Alexander · Union		Joseph L. Priestly	
1	Wabash		Samuel Mundy	
1	Washington · Clinton		John S. Carrigan	
1	Wayne		Alexander Clark	
2	White		Josiah Stewert	
2	White		William Eubanks	

== Works cited ==
- Moses, John (1892). Illinois, historical and statistical.
- Blue Book of the State of Illinois. 1919.
- Blue Book of the State of Illinois - Illinois Legislative Roster — 1818-2024 (PDF). 2024. Archived from the original (PDF) on July 15, 2026.
- Pease, Theodore Calvin (1923). Statistical Series: Illinois Election Returns (1818-1848). Vol. 1. Illinois State Historical Library.
