= 4th Illinois General Assembly =

Term of state legislature in Illinois, US

Type
- Type: Bicameral
- Houses: Senate House of Representatives

Leadership
- President of the Senate: Adolphus Hubbard (first session); Raphael Widen (second session)
- Speaker of the House of Representatives: Thomas Mather (first session); David Blackwell (second session)
- Seats: 18 Senators 36 Representatives

Meeting place
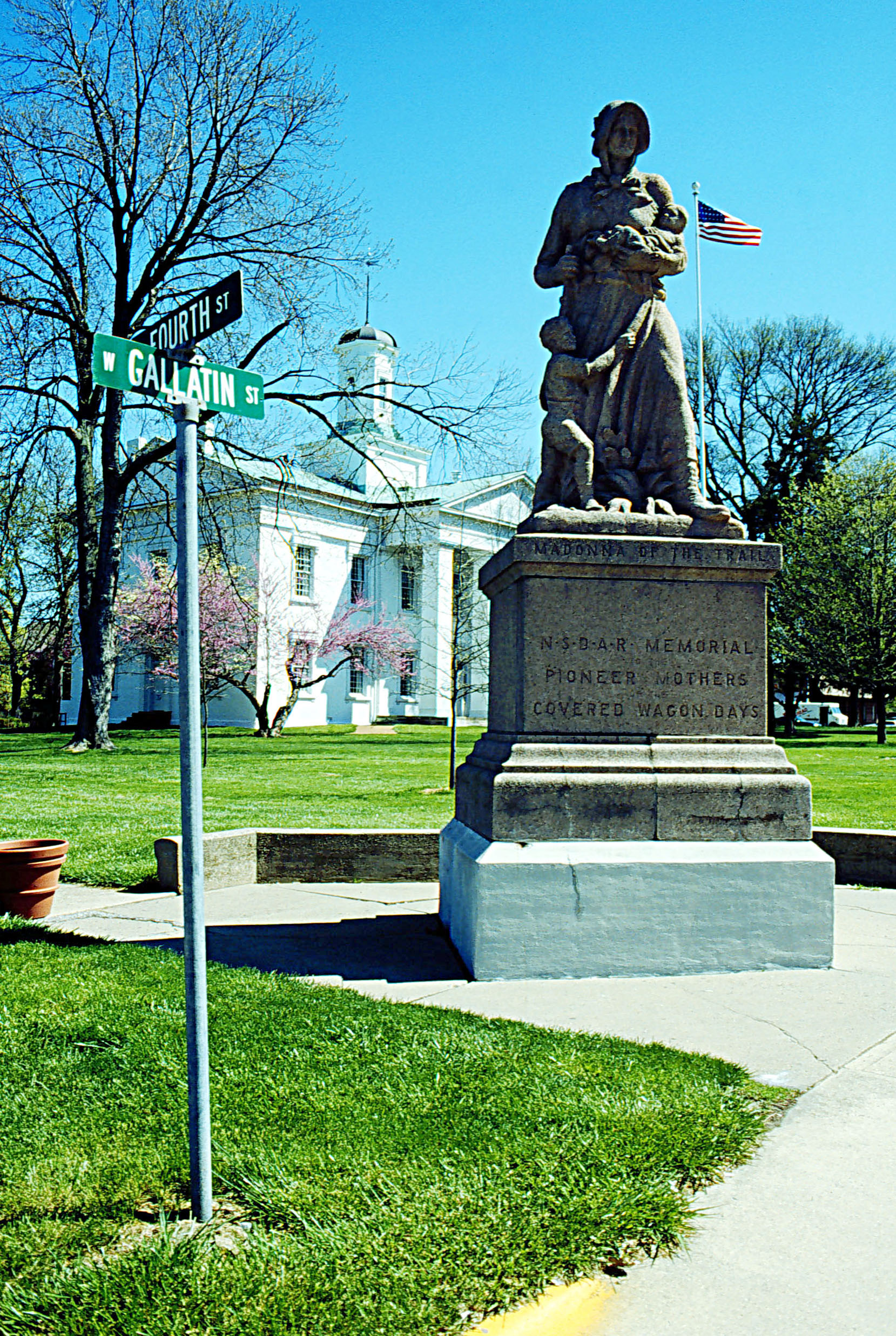
- Vandalia, Illinois

The 4th Illinois General Assembly, consisting of the Illinois Senate and the Illinois House of Representatives, met from November 15, 1824, to January 18, 1825, and again from January 2, 1826, to January 18, 1826, at The Vandalia State House. The apportionment of seats in the House of Representatives was based on the provisions of the First Illinois Constitution. Political parties were not established in the State at the time.

The 4th General Assembly was preceded by the 3rd Illinois General Assembly, and was succeeded by the 5th Illinois General Assembly.

== Members ==
This list is arranged by chamber, then by county. Senators and Representatives were both allotted to counties roughly by population and elected at-large within their districts.

Four new counties were added in 1823: Edgar, Marion, Fulton, and Morgan; and three in 1824: Clay, Clinton, and Wabash.

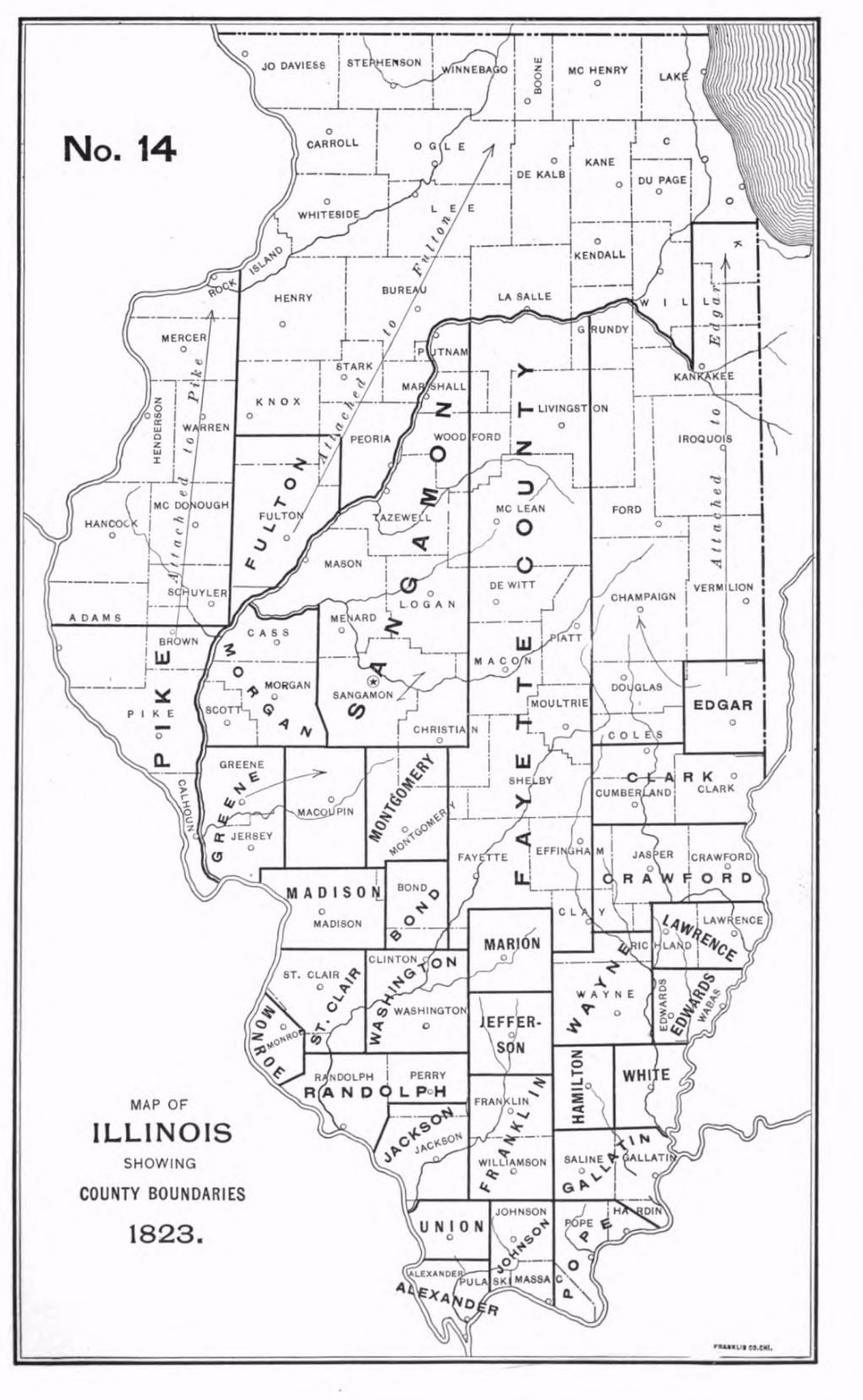
Map of Illinois county boundaries in 1823

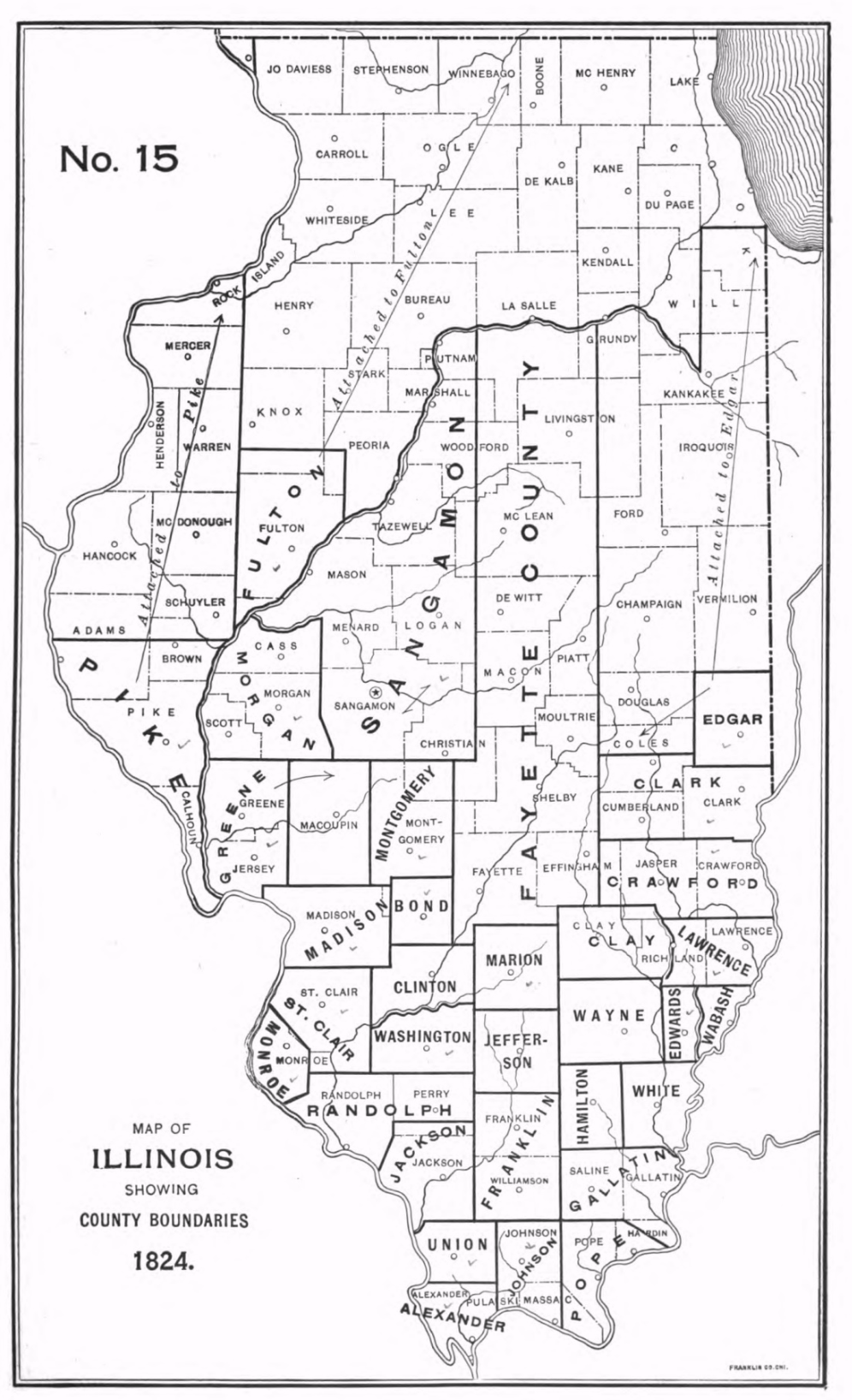
Map of Illinois county boundaries in 1824

=== Senate ===
County Represented	Image	Senator	Remarks
Bond • Fayette • Montgomery		Francis Kirkpatrick	
Clark • Crawford		Daniel Parker	
Edwards		Stephen Bliss	
Gallatin		Michael Jones	
Greene • Pike		Thomas Carlin	elected in special election December 13, 1824
Jefferson • Hamilton		Thomas Sloo	
Jackson		Joseph Duncan	
Franklin • Johnson		John Ewing	
Lawrence		William Kinkade	
Madison		Theophilus Smith	resigned after first session
Madison		Joseph Conway	replaced Smith for the second session
Monroe		Joseph Beaird	
Pope		Lewis Barker	
Randolph		Raphael Widen	
Sangamon		Stephen Stillman	
St. Clair		James Lemen Jr.	
Alexander • Union		John Grammer	
Washington		Andrew Bankson	
Wayne		James Bird	
White		Daniel Hay	

=== House of Representatives ===
Seats in County	Counties represented	Image	Representative	Remarks
1	Alexander		Henry L. Webb	
1	Bond		John Russell	
1	Clark		William B. Archer	
2	Crawford		David Stewart	
2	Crawford		David McGahey	
1	Edwards		Henry Utter	
1	Fayette		John A. Wakefield	
1	Franklin		Thomas M. Dorris	
2	Gallatin		Timothy Gard	
2	Gallatin		Richard T. Jones	
1	Greene · Morgan		Archibald Job	
1	Jackson		Conrad Will	
1	Jefferson		Zadok Casey	
1	Johnson		John Bridges	
1	Lawrence		Asa Norton	
3	Madison		Curtis Blakeman	
3	Madison		George Churchill	
3	Madison		William Otwell	
1	Monroe		George Forquer	Resigned
1	Monroe		Thomas James	Replace Forquer
1	Pike		Nicholas Hansen	Resigned
1	Pike		Levi Roberts	Replaced Hansen
2	Pope		William Sims	
2	Pope		James A. Whiteside	
4	Randolph		Elias K. Kane	served the 1st session, resigned to become U.S. Senator, replaced by Gabriel Jones in the 2nd session
4	Randolph		Gabriel Jones	Replaced Kane
4	Randolph		Thomas Mather	Resigned
4	Randolph		Samuel Smith	Replaced Mather
4	Randolph		Samuel Walker	
1	Sangamon		William S. Hamilton	
3	St. Clair		David Blackwell	
3	St. Clair		Risdon Moore	
3	St. Clair		Abraham Eyman	
2	Union		John Whiteaker	
2	Union		John Hacker	
1	Washington		Philo Beers	
1	Wayne		Rigdon B. Slocum	
3	White		William McHenry	
3	White		George R. Logan	
3	White		Alexander Phillips	

== Employees ==
=== Senate ===
- Secretary: Emanuel J. West
- Enrolling and Engrossing Clerk: Albert G. Sloo
- Sergeant at Arms: Benjamin Ogle (second session: Thomas Higgins)

=== House of Representatives ===
- Clerk: Charles Dunn
- Enrolling and Engrossing Clerk: R.P. Allen
- Doorkeeper: James S. Smith (second session: Thomas Redman)

== See also ==
- List of Illinois state legislatures
