= 6th Illinois General Assembly =

Term of state legislature in Illinois, US

The 6th Illinois General Assembly, consisting of the Illinois Senate and the Illinois House of Representatives, met from December 1, 1828, to January 23, 1829.

The 6th General Assembly was preceded by the 5th Illinois General Assembly, and was succeeded by the 7th Illinois General Assembly.

== Members ==
Four new counties were added in 1827: Shelby, Perry, Tazewell, and Jo Daviess; and two in 1829: Macoupin and Macon.

=== Senate ===
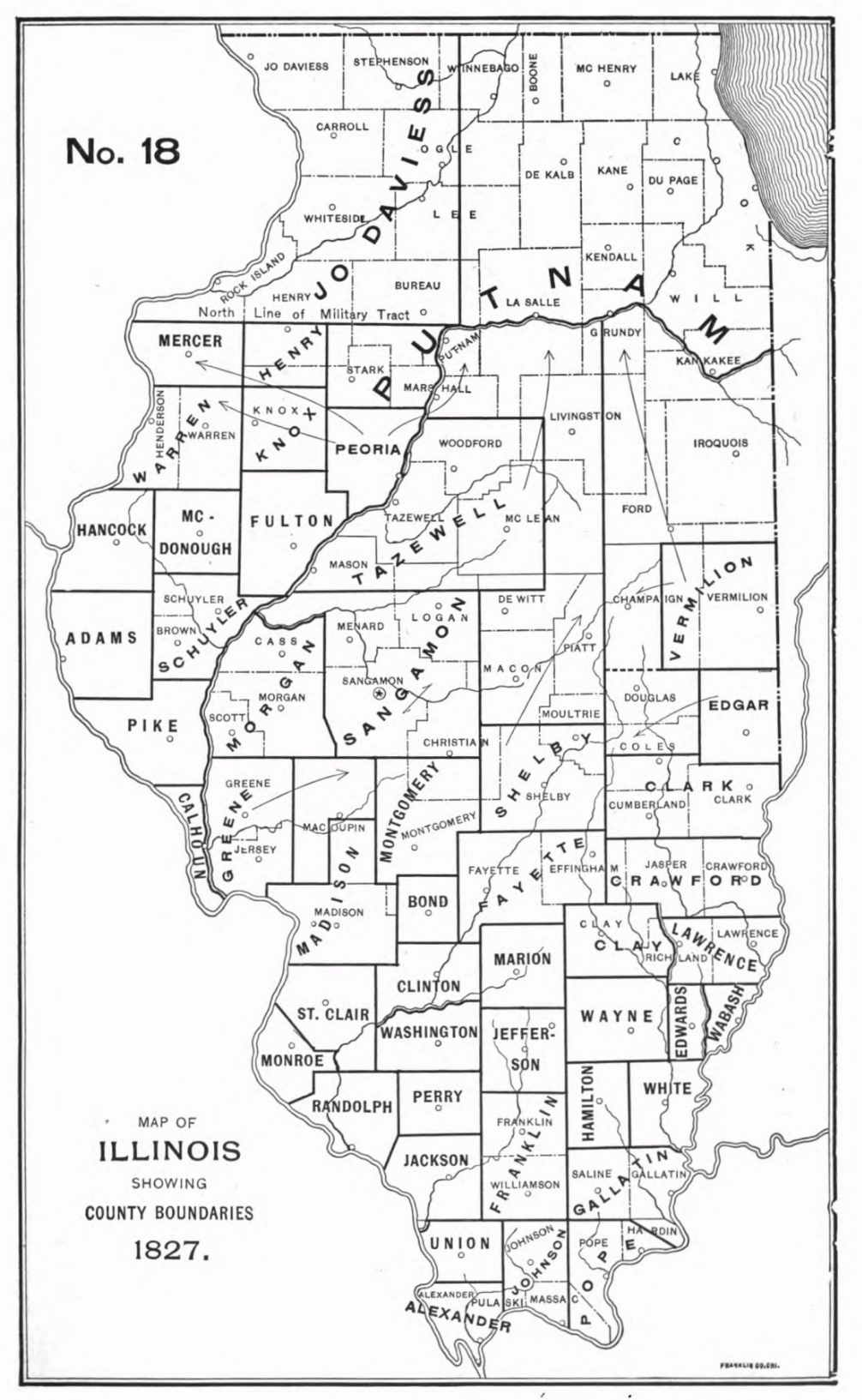
Map of Illinois county boundaries in 1827

Counties) represented	Image	Senator	Term	Remarks
Pope		Samuel Alexander		
Clark		William B. Archer		
Edwards		Enoch Beach	1828–1832	
Greene		Thomas Carlin		
Jefferson		Zadok Casey		
Madison		Joseph Conway		
Randolph · Perry		Samuel Crawford	1828–1832	
Gallatin		Timothy Gard	1826–1830	
Union · Johnson · Alexander		George Hunsacker	1826–1830	
Sangamon		Elijah Iles		
Morgan		Archibald Job	1826–1830	
Crawford · Lawrence		Wickliffe Kitchell		
White		William McHenry		
Bond · Fayette · Macon · Montgomery · Shelby · Tazewell		Robert K. McLaughlin	1828–1832	Macon County was formed in 1829
Clinton		Samuel McRoberts		McRoberts was elected in the 2nd session to fill a vacancy caused by the death of Joseph A. Beaird
St. Clair		Risdon Moore Jr.†		Died Summer 1829 before the 2nd session commenced.
Adams · Fulton · Jo Daviess · Pike · Peoria · Schuyler		Henry J. Ross	1828–1832	
Franklin · Jackson · Washington		Conrad Will		

=== House of Representatives ===
Seats in County	Counties represented	Image	Representative	Remarks
2	Edgar · Clark · Vermillion		Stephen B. Shellody	
2	Edgar · Clark · Vermillion		Charles Ives	
1	Crawford		John C. Alexander	
1	Edwards		Gilbert T. Pell	
2	Bond · Fayette · Montgomery · Shelby · Tazewell		Charles Prentice	
2	Bond · Fayette · Montgomery · Shelby · Tazewell		James Black	
1	Franklin		John Dement	
2	Gallatin		John McLean	
2	Gallatin		Francis Prince	
2	Greene · Calhoun		Thomas Rattan	
2	Greene · Calhoun		John Allen	
1	Hamilton		James Hall	
1	Jackson · Perry		Singleton H. Kimmel	
1	Jefferson · Clay		Israel Jennings	
1	Lawrence		Henry M. Gilham	
2	Madison		William Jones	
2	Madison		George Churchill	
1	Monroe		Moses Lemen	
2	Morgan		William L. May	
2	Morgan		Willie B. Green	
1	Pike · Adams · Schuyler · Fulton · Peoria · Jo Daviess		John Turney	
1	Pope		James A. Whiteside	
2	Randolph · Perry		John Lacey	
2	Randolph · Perry		Thomas Mather	
3	Sangamon		Johnathan H. Pugh	
3	Sangamon		Peter Cartwright	
3	Sangamon		William F. Elkin	
2	St. Clair		John Reynolds	
2	St. Clair		William G. Brown	
2	Johnson · Alexander · Union		Alexander P. Field	
2	Johnson · Alexander · Union		John Whiteaker	
1	Wabash		Samuel Mundy	
1	Washington · Clinton		John S. Carrigan	
1	Wayne		Rigdon B. Slocumb	
2	White		William Eubanks	
2	White		Josiah Stewart	

== Works cited ==
- Moses, John (1892). Illinois, historical and statistical.
- Blue Book of the State of Illinois. 1919.
- Blue Book of the State of Illinois - Illinois Legislative Roster — 1818-2024 (PDF). 2024. Archived from the original (PDF) on July 15, 2026.
- Pease, Theodore Calvin (1923). Statistical Series: Illinois Election Returns (1818-1848). Vol. 1. Illinois State Historical Library.
