= Robert K. McLaughlin =

American politician

Member of the Illinois Senate
- In office 1836–1838

Member of the Illinois Senate
- In office 1828–1832

Member of the Illinois House of Representatives
- In office 1826–1828

Robert K. McLaughlin was an American politician who served as a member of the Illinois House of Representatives and the Illinois Senate.

He unsuccessfully ran for state representative in the August 2, 1824 election to represent Fayette and Montgomery in the 4th Illinois General Assembly but was defeated by John A. Wakefield. On August 7, 1826, he won in the general election to serve as one of two state representative (the other being William Berry) for the district comprising Bond, Fayette, and Montgomery counties in the 5th Illinois General Assembly. On August 4, 1828, he won election to a 4-year term as a state senator representing Bond , Fayette, Montgomery, Shelby, Tazewell (and later Macon) counties which spanned the 6th and 7th Illinois General Assemblies. He ran for relection to the Senate to the district comprising Fayette, Marion, and Clay counties in 1832 but lost to William Lee D. Ewing. In the election of August 1, 1836, he won a 2-year term as a state senator representing Fayette, Effingham, and Clay counties in the 10th Illinois General Assembly.

McLaughlin unsuccessfully ran for governor in 1834; and for federal representative in 1846.
