= John Ewing (Illinois politician) =

American politician

Member of the Illinois Senate
- In office 1824–1828
- Preceded by: Milton Ladd
- Succeeded by: George Hunsacker (Johnson); Conrad Will (Franklin)

John Ewing was an American politician who served as a member of the Illinois Senate. He served as a state senator representing Johnson County and Franklin County in the 4th Illinois General Assembly and 5th Illinois General Assembly defeating three candidates in a close election on the August 2, 1824 to a 4-year Senate term.
