= 8th Illinois General Assembly =

Meeting of the Illinois state legislature from 1832 to 1833

The 8th Illinois General Assembly, consisting of the Illinois Senate and the Illinois House of Representatives, met from December 3, 1832, to March 2, 1833.

The 8th General Assembly was preceded by the 7th Illinois General Assembly, and was succeeded by the 9th Illinois General Assembly.

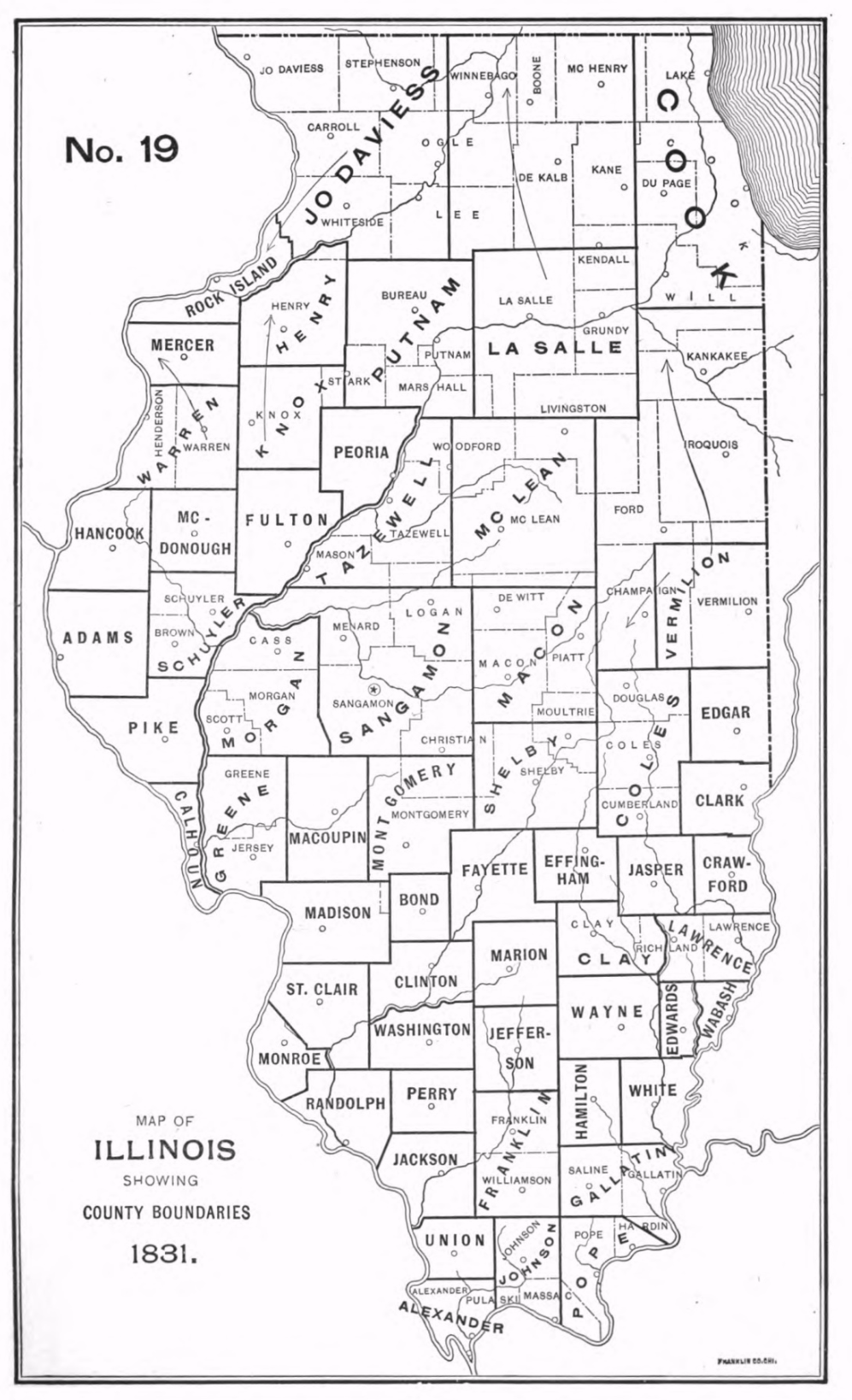
Map of Illinois county boundaries in 1831

== Members ==
Legislation passed on February 7, 1831 in the 7th Illinois General Assembly increased the Senate from 18 to 26 members and the House from 36 to 55 members. This would last until January 14, 1836 when the Senate was increased to 40 Senators and the House increased to 91 representatives.

== Senate ==
County(ies) Represented	Image	Senator	Remarks
Clark		William Archer	
Tazewell		James Bird	
Madison		Joseph Conway	
Bond • Macoupin • Montgomery		Larkin Craig	
White		William Davidson	
Morgan		James Evans	
Fayette		William Ewing	
Sangamon		George Forquer	
Union		John Grammer	
Sangamon		Elijah Iles	
Morgan		Waller Jones	
Monroe		Jonathan Lynch	
Randolph		Thomas Mather	
Hamilton		Ennis Maulding	
Schuyler		William McCreery	
Crawford		David McGahey	
Edwards		Henry Mills	
Greene		Thomas Rattan	
Pope		John Raum	
St. Clair		Adam Snyder	
Cook		James Strode	
Vermilion		John Vance	
Gallatin		John Watkins	
Jackson		Conrad Will	
Adams		Archibald Williams	
Macon		William Williamson	

== Works cited ==
- Moses, John (1892). Illinois, historical and statistical.
- Blue Book of the State of Illinois. 1919.
- Blue Book of the State of Illinois - Illinois Legislative Roster — 1818-2024 (PDF). 2024. Archived from the original (PDF) on July 15, 2026.
- Pease, Theodore Calvin (1923). Statistical Series: Illinois Election Returns (1818-1848). Vol. 1. Illinois State Historical Library.
