= Alfred W. Cavarly =

American politician

Member of the Illinois State Senate
- In office 1842–1848
- Preceded by: John Allen

Member of the Illinois House of Representatives
- In office 1840–1842

Member of the Illinois House of Representatives
- In office 1826–1828

Personal details
- Born: September 15, 1793 Connecticut
- Died: October 25, 1876 (aged 83) Ottawa, Illinois

Alfred W. Cavarly was an American politician who served as a member of the Illinois House of Representatives and of the Illinois State Senate.

== Biography ==
Cavalry was born on September 15, 1793, in Connecticut. He served in the Connecticut militia during the War of 1812. He practiced law in Saybrook, Connecticut under Samuel Ingham. Immediately after his admittance to the Connecticut Bar in December 1819, he migrated to Edwardsville, Illinois and then Carrollton, Illinois with his younger brother, Lyman.

Cavarly was defeated in a special election held on December 13, 1824, to represent Greene, Pike, Morgan, and Fulton counties in the Illinois House of Representatives in the 4th Illinois General Assembly with Thomas Carlin emerging as the victor. In 1826, he won election as one of two representatives for Greene and Calhoun counties in the Illinois House of Representatives along with John Allen in the 5th Illinois General Assembly. In the August 4, 1828 election he was again defeated by Thomas Carlin for a seat in the Illinois Senate representing Greene and Calhoun counties in the 6th Illinois General Assembly. In 1840, he won election to the Illinois House of representatives as one of three representatives representing Greene and Calhoun counties in the 12th Illinois General Assembly (along with Revill W. English and David W. Woodson). In the August 1, 1842 election, after the death of John Allen less than two years into his four year term, he was elected as state senator to serve a two-year term representing Greene and Jersey counties in the 13th Illinois General Assembly which created a dilemma as Revill W. English had simultaneously been elected to represent the newly formed district of Greene and Calhoun counties creating one too many senators, the result of a clumsily written Apportionment Act of 1841. The full Senate determined that neither was duly elected although the matter was made moot as English honorably resigned and Cavarly was allowed to be seated as there was no opposition. In the August 5, 1844 election, Cavarly was elected to the Senate for a four-year term representing Greene and Calhoun counties spanning the 14th and 15th Illinois General Assemblies defeating Revill W. English.

Cavalry died on October 25, 1876, in Ottawa, Illinois.
