= William McHenry =

American politician

Member of the Illinois General Assembly from White County
- In office 1834 – February 3, 1835
- Preceded by: John C. Goudy
- Succeeded by: Edwin B. Webb

Member of the Illinois Senate
- In office 1828–1832
- Preceded by: Daniel Hay
- Succeeded by: William H. Davidson

Member of the Illinois General Assembly from White County
- In office 1824–1828
- Preceded by: John Emmett
- Succeeded by: Josiah Stewart

Member of the Illinois General Assembly from White County
- In office 1818–1820
- Preceded by: Constituency established
- Succeeded by: George R. Logan

Personal details
- Born: 1771 Kentucky, U.S.
- Died: February 3, 1835 (aged 63–64) Vandalia, Illinois, U.S.

Military service
- Allegiance: Price's Battalion of Mounted Volunteers
- Battles/wars: War of 1812; Battle of Fallen Timbers; Tecumseh's War; Black Hawk War

William McHenry was an American politician and military officer.

== Early life ==
McHenry was born in Kentucky in 1771.

== Career ==
McHenry served as a lieutenant in Price's Battalion of Mounted Volunteers and participated at the Battle of Fallen Timbers in 1794, near modern Toledo, Ohio.

McHenry moved from Henderson County, Kentucky, in 1810. The family settled in what is now White County, Illinois, along the trail between the salt works near Old Shawneetown, Illinois, and Forts of Vincennes, Indiana.

In 1811, McHenry served in the Illinois Militia during Tecumseh's War, which culminated in the Battle of Tippecanoe in the Indiana Territory. After the outbreak of the War of 1812, he participated in the attack on the Native American village at Peoria, which was allied with the British.

McHenry served as a major, leading the Mounted Spies, in the Black Hawk War in 1832. He became ill during the campaign.

=== Politics ===
McHenry was a delegate to the Illinois Constitutional Convention in 1818. McHenry was elected as a state representative representing White County to the 1st, 4th, and 5th General Assemblies; as a state senator representing White County in the 6th and 7th General Assemblies; and last again as a state representative representing White County in the 9th General Assembly.

McHenry died during his last term as state representative in 1835.

== Personal life ==
He married Hannah Ruth Blackford in the late 1790s in Logan County, Kentucky.

McHenry died on February 3, 1835, in a boarding house in Vandalia, Illinois, which was then the location of the state capitol.

== Legacy ==
McHenry is the namesake of McHenry County and McHenry, Illinois, located in the northwest suburbs of Chicago.
