= 1830 Illinois lieutenant gubernatorial election =

- August 2, 1830
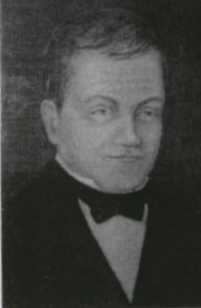

Nominee	Zadok Casey	Rigdon Slocumb	James Adams
Party	Democratic	Democratic-Republican	Nonpartisan
Popular vote	10,209	8,488	1,647
Percentage	50.18%	41.72%	8.10%
Lieutenant Governor before election
William Kinney
Democratic-Republican
Elected Lieutenant Governor
Zadok Casey
Democratic

The 1830 Illinois lieutenant gubernatorial election was held on August 2, 1830, in order to elect the lieutenant governor of Illinois. Democratic nominee Zadok Casey defeated Democratic-Republican nominee Rigdon Slocumb, candidate James Adams and candidate James M. Higbee.

== General election ==
On election day, August 2, 1830, Democratic nominee Zadok Casey won the election by a margin of 1,721 votes against his foremost opponent Democratic-Republican nominee Rigdon Slocumb, thereby gaining Democratic control over the office of lieutenant governor. Casey was sworn in as the 4th lieutenant governor of Illinois on December 6, 1830.

=== Results ===
Illinois lieutenant gubernatorial election, 1830
Party	Candidate	Votes	%
Democratic	Zadok Casey	10,209	50.18
Democratic-Republican	Rigdon Slocumb	8,488	41.72
Nonpartisan	James Adams	1,647	8.10
Nonpartisan	James M. Higbee	1	0.00
Total votes		20,345	100.00
Democratic gain from Democratic-Republican			

== See also ==
- 1830 Illinois gubernatorial election
