= 1834 Illinois lieutenant gubernatorial election =

- August 4, 1834

Nominee	Alexander M. Jenkins	James Evans	William Beatty Archer
Party	Democratic	Democratic	Democratic-Republican
Popular vote	13,795	8,609	7,573
Percentage	45.65%	28.49%	25.06%
Lieutenant Governor before election
William Lee D. Ewing (Acting)
Democratic
Elected Lieutenant Governor
Alexander M. Jenkins
Democratic

The 1834 Illinois lieutenant gubernatorial election was held on August 4, 1834, in order to elect the lieutenant governor of Illinois. Democratic candidate and incumbent speaker of the Illinois House of Representatives Alexander M. Jenkins defeated Democratic candidate James Evans and Democratic-Republican nominee William Beatty Archer.

== General election ==
On election day, August 4, 1834, Democratic candidate Alexander M. Jenkins won the election by a margin of 5,186 votes against his foremost opponent and fellow Democratic candidate James Evans, thereby retaining Democratic control over the office of lieutenant governor. Jenkins was sworn in as the 6th lieutenant governor of Illinois on December 3, 1834.

=== Results ===
Illinois lieutenant gubernatorial election, 1834
Party	Candidate	Votes	%
Democratic	Alexander M. Jenkins	13,795	45.65
Democratic	James Evans	8,609	28.49
Democratic-Republican	William Beatty Archer	7,573	25.06
Write-in		245	0.80
Total votes		30,222	100.00
Democratic hold			

== See also ==
- 1834 Illinois gubernatorial election
