= Benjamin Parker (Illinois politician) =

American politician

Member of the Illinois House of Representatives
- In office August 2, 1830 – December 10, 1830
- Succeeded by: Stephen B. Shellody

Benjamin Parker was an American politician who served as a member of the Illinois House of Representatives. In 1828, Parker unsuccessfully ran for election as state representative representing Edgar, Clark, and Vermillion counties in the 6th Illinois General Assembly. He tried again in the same district and won election on August 2, 1830 as a state representative representing Edgar, Clark, and Vermillion counties in the 7th Illinois General Assembly, one of two representatives representing the district along with Daniel W. Beckwith. The election was successfully contested by the runner-up Stephen B. Shellody and Shellody took his seat on December 10, 1830. In 1834, he ran for state representative in Coles County in the 9th Illinois General Assembly but was defeated by James T. Cunningham.
