= Asa Norton =

American politician

Member of the Illinois House of Representatives
- In office 1824–1826

Asa Norton was an American politician who served as a member of the Illinois House of Representatives.

Norton served as a state representative representing Lawrence County in the 4th Illinois General Assembly after defeating Valentine J. Bradley in the August 2, 1824 election. He unsuccessfully ran for a seat in the state house representing Crawford county in the 1826 election to the 6th Illinois General Assembly being defeated by John C. Alexander.
