= John Bridges (Illinois politician) =

American politician

Member of the Illinois House of Representatives
- In office 1824–1826

John Bridges was an American politician who served as a member of the Illinois House of Representatives.

Bridges served as a state representatives representing Johnson County in the 4th Illinois General Assembly after defeating Joseph Kuykendall and Isaac D. Wilcox in the August 2, 1824 election. He unsuccessfully ran for a seat in the state house representing Randolph and Union counties in the 1830 election to the 7th Illinois General Assembly.
