= Archibald Job =

American politician

Member of the Illinois Senate
- In office 1826–1830

Member of the Illinois House of Representatives
- In office 1824–1826

Archibald Job was an American politician who served as a member of the Illinois Senate and the Illinois House of Representatives.

In the August 2, 1824 general election, he was elected as state representative to Greene and Morgan counties in the 4th Illinois General Assembly. After his term as representative, he was elected to a 4-year term as a state senator on August 7, 1826 representing Adams, Fulton, Morgan, Pike, Peoria, and Schuyler counties spanning the 5th and 6th General Assemblies. The district was reduced to Morgan County alone in 1828.
