= Samuel Walker (Illinois politician) =

American politician

Member of the Illinois House of Representatives
- In office 1818–1820

Member of the Illinois House of Representatives
- In office 1824–1826

Samuel Walker was an American politician who served as a member of the Illinois House of Representatives. He served as a state representative representing Randolph County in the 1st Illinois General Assembly and the 4th Illinois General Assembly.
