= William Otwell =

American politician

Member of the Illinois House of Representatives
- In office 1838–1840

Member of the Illinois House of Representatives
- In office 1824–1826

Member of the Illinois House of Representatives
- In office 1820–1822

William Otwell was an American politician who served as a member of the Illinois House of Representatives.

He served as a state representative representing Madison County in the 2nd Illinois General Assembly, the 4th Illinois General Assembly, and the 11th Illinois General Assembly.
