= Elijah Ewing =

American politician

Member of the Illinois House of Representatives
- In office 1818–1820
- Succeeded by: Thomas M. Dorris

Elijah Ewing was an American politician who served as a member of the Illinois House of Representatives. He served as a state representative representing Franklin County in the 1st Illinois General Assembly.
