= James Lemen Jr. =

American politician

Member of the Illinois Senate
- In office 1820–1822
- Preceded by: William Kinney
- Succeeded by: William Kinney

Member of the Illinois Senate
- In office 1824–1828
- Preceded by: William Kinney
- Succeeded by: Risdon Moore Jr.

James Lemen Jr. was an American politician who served as a member of the Illinois Senate. He served as a state senator representing St. Clair County in the 2nd General Assembly, the 4th General Assembly, and the 5th General Assembly. He is the son of James Lemen, church founder and an influential leader of the anti-slavery movement in Indiana Territory.
