= James Bird (Illinois politician) =

American politician

Member of the Illinois Senate
- In office 1832–1834

Member of the Illinois Senate
- In office 1824–1828

James Bird was an American politician who served as a member of the Illinois Senate. He served as a state senator representing Lawrence County in the 4th General Assembly and the 5th General Assembly; and representing Tazewell County and McLean County the 8th General Assembly.
