= Enoch Beach =

American politician

Member of the Illinois State Senate
- In office 1828–1832

Enoch Beach was an American politician who served as a member of the Illinois State Senate.

In the August 6, 1876, Beach unsuccessfully ran for Illinois State representative in Wayne county being defeated by William B. Davis. In the August 4, 1828 general election, Beach won a 4-year term to the Illinois State Senate representing Edwards, Wabash, and Wayne counties spanning the 6th and 7th Illinois General Assemblies. In the August 6, 1832 general election, he ran for reelection for the same seat but was defeated by Henry I. Mills.
