= Thomas M. Dorris =

American politician

Member of the Illinois House of Representatives
- In office 1820–1828
- Preceded by: Elijah Ewing
- Succeeded by: John Dement

Thomas M. Dorris was an American politician who served as a member of the Illinois House of Representatives.

He served as a state representative representing Franklin County in the 2nd Illinois General Assembly, 3rd Illinois General Assembly, 4th Illinois General Assembly, and 5th Illinois General Assembly.
