= Thomas Roberts (Illinois politician) =

American politician

Member of the Illinois Senate
- In office 1818–1820
- Preceded by: inaugural
- Succeeded by: Milton Ladd

Thomas Roberts was an American politician who served as a member of the Illinois Senate.

Roberts was a signatory of the First Illinois Constitutional Convention. He served as a state senator representing Johnson County and Franklin County in the 1st Illinois General Assembly.
