= John Grammer =

American politician

Member of the Illinois Senate
- In office 1822–1826

Member of the Illinois Senate
- In office 1830–1834
- Preceded by: George Hunsacker

John Grammer was an American politician who served as a member of the Illinois Senate. He served as a state senator representing Union County in the 3rd, 4th, 7th, and 8th Illinois General Assemblies.
