= Joseph Conway (Illinois politician) =

American politician

Member of the Illinois Senate
- In office 1826–1834
- Preceded by: Theophilus W. Smith
- Succeeded by: Cyrus Edwards

Joseph Conway was an American politician who served as a member of the Illinois Senate. He served as a state senator representing Madison County in the 4th, 5th, 6th, 7th, and 8th Illinois General Assemblies.

== Biography ==
Conway was born in Kentucky and relocated to Randolph County, Illinois in 1811. Conway was first elected to the second session of the 4th general assembly in 1825 as state senator from Madison county to fill a vacancy caused by the resignation of Theophilus W. Smith.
