= Stephen Stillman =

American politician

Member of the Illinois Senate
- In office 1822–1826

Stephen Stillman was an American politician who served as a member of the Illinois Senate. He served as a state senator representing Sangamon County in the 3rd and 4th Illinois General Assemblies.
