= Daniel W. Beckwith =

American politician

Member of the Illinois House of Representatives
- In office 1830–1832

Daniel W. Beckwith was an American politician who served as a member of the Illinois House of Representatives. He served as a state representative representing Edgar, Clark, and Vermillion counties in the 7th Illinois General Assembly, one of two representatives representing the district along with Benjamin Parker. (Although Parker won the initial election, the runner-up Stephen B. Shellody successfully contested and was seated after several months). Beckwith ran for reelection in Vermillion County which had been separated into its own district in 1832 but was defeated by John W. Vance.
