= Moses Michaels =

American politician

Member of the Illinois House of Representatives
- In office 1820–1822
- Preceded by: Henry Utter
- Succeeded by: Gilbert T. Pell

Moses Michaels was an American politician who served as a member of the Illinois House of Representatives.

He served as a state representative representing Edwards County in the 2nd Illinois General Assembly.
