= Lewis Barker (Illinois politician) =

American politician

Member of the Illinois Senate
- In office 1818–1826

Lewis Barker was an American politician who served as a member of the Illinois Senate. He served as a state senator representing Pope County in the 1st, 2nd, 3rd, and 4th Illinois General Assemblies.f>
