= Milton Ladd =

American politician

Member of the Illinois Senate
- In office 1820–1824
- Preceded by: Thomas Roberts
- Succeeded by: John Ewing

Milton Ladd was an American politician who served as a member of the Illinois Senate. He served as a state senator representing Johnson County and Franklin County in the 2nd and 3rd Illinois General Assemblies.
