= Francis Kirkpatrick =

American politician

Member of the Illinois House of Representatives
- In office 1818–1820

Member of the Illinois Senate
- In office 1824–1828
- Preceded by: Martin Jones

Francis Kirkpatrick was an American politician who served as a member of the Illinois Senate and the Illinois House of Representatives. He served as a state representative representing Bond County in the 1st Illinois General Assembly. He later served as a state senator representing Bond County in the 4th Illinois General Assembly and 5th Illinois General Assembly.
