= Alexander Jamison =

American politician

Member of the Illinois Senate
- In office 1818–1822
- Preceded by: Inaugural
- Succeeded by: Joseph A. Beaird

Alexander Jamison was an American politician who served as a member of the Illinois Senate. He served as a state senator representing Monroe County in the 1st and 2nd Illinois General Assemblies.
