= 1834 Illinois state capitol referendum =

In the Illinois State Capitol Referendum of 1834, voters in the state of Illinois were asked on August 4, 1834, to choose the next state capitol. Six locations were placed on the ballot: Alton, Springfield, Peoria, Jacksonville, the Geographic center of the state, and the current capital, Vandalia. The Geographic center was at the time assumed to be Illiopolis, but this is now known to be untrue.

Alton received the most votes, but the General Assembly never acted on this, and it never was the capitol. Eventually, the capitol would be moved to Springfield.

== Results ==
Illinois State Capitol Referendum, 1834
| City | Votes | Percentage |
|---|---|---|
| Alton | 8,157 | 33.36% |
| Vandalia | 7,730 | 31.62% |
| Springfield | 7,075 | 28.94% |
| Geographic Center of the State | 790 | 3.23% |
| Peoria | 423 | 1.73% |
| Jacksonville | 273 | 1.12% |
| Totals | 24,448 | 100.00% |

== See also ==
- Illinois gubernatorial election, 1834
