= Samuel C. Pierce =

American politician

Member of the Illinois House of Representatives
- In office 1830–1834

Samuel C. Pierce was an American politician who served as a member of the Illinois House of Representatives. He served as a state representative representing Greene, Calhoun, and Macoupin counties in the 7th Illinois General Assembly and Greene County and Calhoun County in the 8th Illinois General Assembly.
