= Henry J. Ross =

American politician

Member of the Illinois Senate
- In office 1828–1832

Member of the Illinois House of Representatives
- In office 1826–1828

Henry J. Ross was an American politician who served as a member of the Illinois House of Representatives and the Illinois Senate.

On August 7, 1826, he won in the general election to serve as a state representative for the district comprising Adams, Fulton, Peoria, Pike, and Schuyler counties in the 5th Illinois General Assembly. On August 4, 1828, he won election to a 4-year term as a state senator representing Adams, Fulton, Jo Daviess, Pike, Peoria, and Schuyler counties which spanned the 7th and 8th Illinois General Assemblies.
