= Martin Jones (Illinois politician) =

American politician

Member of the Illinois Senate from the Bond County district
- In office 1818–1824
- Preceded by: inaugural
- Succeeded by: Francis Kirkpatrick

Martin Jones was an American politician who served as a member of the Illinois Senate. He served as a state senator representing Bond County in the 1st, 2nd, and 3rd Illinois General Assemblies.
