= Caseyville, Illinois =

Caseyville
- Village
- Location of Caseyville in St. Clair County, Illinois.
- Coordinates: 38°37′40″N 90°01′52″W
- Country: United States
- State: Illinois
- County: St. Clair

Area
  - Total: 7.43 sq mi (19.24 km^{2})
  - Land: 7.27 sq mi (18.83 km^{2})
  - Water: 0.16 sq mi (0.41 km^{2})
- Elevation: 420 ft (130 m)

Population (2020)
  - Total: 4,400
  - Density: 605.1/sq mi (233.62/km^{2})
- Time zone: UTC-6 (CST)
  - Summer (DST): UTC-5 (CDT)
- ZIP code: 62232
- Area code: 618
- FIPS code: 17-11644
- GNIS feature ID: 2397568
- Website: www.caseyville.org

Caseyville is a village in St. Clair County, Illinois, United States. The population was 4,400 at the 2020 census, an increase from 4,245 in 2010.

== History ==
A wealthy man named Charles Harbour built a house here, and in 1845 built a sawmill. There were deposits of coal in the area, and Harbour was one of several members of the Illinois Coal Company, along with Zadok Casey, Walter Seates, Malcomb Robinson, Charles Barrett and John Roy. Casey had held several offices including United States Representative and Lieutenant Governor of Illinois. In 1849, the Illinois Coal Company founded the town and named it for Casey. Coal mining began, and in 1851 the company constructed a railroad to nearby Brooklyn to transport the coal. In 1850 there were about 40 people here, and by 1851 this had increased to about 150; by 1881 the population was approximately 800. The first post office was established here in 1856, and the village was incorporated in May 1869. A school was built in 1872, and a church in 1879.

== Geography ==
According to the 2010 census, Caseyville has a total area of 7.168 square miles (18.57 km^{2}), of which 7.01 square miles (18.16 km^{2}) (or 97.8%) is land and 0.158 square miles (0.41 km^{2}) (or 2.2%) is water.

== Demographics ==
Historical population
Census	Pop.	Note	%±
1880	658		—
1890	475		−27.8%
1900	449		−5.5%
1910	613		36.5%
1920	675		10.1%
1930	743		10.1%
1940	865		16.4%
1950	1,209		39.8%
1960	2,455		103.1%
1970	3,411		38.9%
1980	4,308		26.3%
1990	4,419		2.6%
2000	4,310		−2.5%
2010	4,245		−1.5%
2020	4,400		3.7%
U.S. Decennial Census

=== Racial and ethnic composition ===
Caseyville village, Illinois – Racial and ethnic composition Note: the US Census treats Hispanic/Latino as an ethnic category. This table excludes Latinos from the racial categories and assigns them to a separate category. Hispanics/Latinos may be of any race.
Race / Ethnicity (NH = Non-Hispanic)	Pop 2000	Pop 2010	Pop 2020	% 2000	% 2010	% 2020
White alone (NH)	3,759	3,332	2,886	87.22%	78.49%	65.59%
Black or African American alone (NH)	336	411	497	7.80%	9.68%	11.30%
Native American or Alaska Native alone (NH)	15	16	13	0.35%	0.38%	0.30%
Asian alone (NH)	6	21	24	0.14%	0.49%	0.55%
Native Hawaiian or Pacific Islander alone (NH)	0	3	4	0.00%	0.07%	0.09%
Other race alone (NH)	2	0	14	0.05%	0.00%	0.32%
Mixed race or Multiracial (NH)	40	72	233	0.93%	1.70%	5.30%
Hispanic or Latino (any race)	152	390	729	3.53%	9.19%	16.57%
Total	4,310	4,245	4,400	100.00%	100.00%	100.00%

=== 2020 census ===
As of the 2020 census, Caseyville had a population of 4,400. The median age was 40.7 years. 21.8% of residents were under the age of 18 and 19.3% of residents were 65 years of age or older. For every 100 females there were 98.6 males, and for every 100 females age 18 and over there were 94.3 males age 18 and over.

97.5% of residents lived in urban areas, while 2.5% lived in rural areas.

There were 1,737 households in Caseyville, of which 29.1% had children under the age of 18 living in them. Of all households, 36.6% were married-couple households, 22.0% were households with a male householder and no spouse or partner present, and 30.7% were households with a female householder and no spouse or partner present. About 32.1% of all households were made up of individuals and 16.4% had someone living alone who was 65 years of age or older.

There were 1,997 housing units, of which 13.0% were vacant. The homeowner vacancy rate was 4.1% and the rental vacancy rate was 9.0%.

Racial composition as of the 2020 census
Race	Number	Percent
White	2,999	68.2%
Black or African American	499	11.3%
American Indian and Alaska Native	58	1.3%
Asian	24	0.5%
Native Hawaiian and Other Pacific Islander	4	0.1%
Some other race	448	10.2%
Two or more races	368	8.4%

=== 2000 census ===
As of the census of 2000, there were 4,310 people, 1,686 households, and 1,126 families residing in the village. The population density was 694.0 inhabitants per square mile (268.0/km^{2}). There were 1,786 housing units at an average density of 287.6 per square mile (111.0/km^{2}). The racial makeup of the village was 89.30% White, 7.84% African American, 0.35% Native American, 0.16% Asian, 1.04% from other races, and 1.30% from two or more races. Hispanic or Latino of any race were 3.53% of the population.

There were 1,686 households, out of which 28.2% had children under the age of 18 living with them, 46.4% were married couples living together, 14.5% had a female householder with no husband present, and 33.2% were non-families. 25.8% of all households were made up of individuals, and 12.6% had someone living alone who was 65 years of age or older. The average household size was 2.48 and the average family size was 2.98.

In the village, the population was spread out, with 23.3% under the age of 18, 8.7% from 18 to 24, 27.9% from 25 to 44, 22.2% from 45 to 64, and 17.9% who were 65 years of age or older. The median age was 39 years. For every 100 females, there were 93.4 males. For every 100 females age 18 and over, there were 89.5 males.

The median income for a household in the village was $31,512, and the median income for a family was $36,429. Males had a median income of $30,943 versus $20,713 for females. The per capita income for the village was $15,467. About 6.8% of families and 9.8% of the population were below the poverty line, including 15.4% of those under age 18 and 5.6% of those age 65 or over.

== Notable people ==
- Larry Doyle, second baseman for the New York Giants and Chicago Cubs
- Jack Maher, soccer player
- Yadier Molina, catcher for St. Louis Cardinals, resided here until 2015
