= David Stewart (Illinois politician) =

American politician

Member of the Illinois House of Representatives
- In office 1824–1826

David Stewart was an American politician who served as a member of the Illinois House of Representatives.

Stewart served as one of two state representatives representing Crawford County in the 4th Illinois General Assembly serving alongside David McGahey.
