= Stephen B. Shellody =

American politician

Member of the Illinois House of Representatives
- In office 1828–1830
- Succeeded by: Benjamin Parker

Member of the Illinois House of Representatives
- In office December 10, 1830 – 1832
- Preceded by: Benjamin Parker

Stephen B. Shellody was an American politician who served as a member of the Illinois House of Representatives. In 1828, Shellody won election as a state representative representing Edgar, Clark, and Vermillion counties in the 6th Illinois General Assembly. He ran for relection for one of the two seats in the same district in 1830 in the 7th Illinois General Assembly but lost to Benjamin Parker and Daniel W. Beckwith. He successfully contested the election and unseated Parker on December 10, 1830.
