= Nicholas Hansen =

American politician

Member of the Illinois House of Representatives
- In office 1823–1823
- Preceded by: district established
- Succeeded by: John Shaw
- In office 1824–1826

Personal details
- Born: 1781 New York
- Died: 1872 (age 91) New York

Nicholas Hansen was an American politician who served as a member of the Illinois House of Representatives. He served as a state representative representing Pike County in the 3rd Illinois General Assembly and the 4th Illinois General Assembly.

Hansen was originally from Albany, New York where he graduated from Union College before moving to Illinois. He served as a probate judge in Pike County from 1821 to 1822 and as a colonel of the Seventeenth Regiment Illinois Militia in 1821 and commissioned as brigadier-general in 1824.

His election was contested by his opponent John Shaw but the committee on elections reported unanimously in his favor and he was seated. At the time, a special committee was established to consider the holding of a Constitutional Convention to put the question of slavery before the people of the state. The matter required a 2/3rd vote in the State House and Senate to proceed. The propenents of the resolution had the necessary votes in both the Senate and the House although when the vote was called, Hansen voted in the negative. The following day, fellow representative Alexander Pope Field, after a long speech, moved to reconsider the vote declaring Shaw entitled to his seat. A vote was held, Hansen was ousted, and his former opponent, John Shaw, was seated in the House as Hansen's replacement.

Hansen ran again for the same seat in 1824 and was duly elected.

After his stint in the state legislature, he again served as a probate judge in 1826. In 1829, Hansen returned to New York where he lived until his death in 1872 at age 91.
