= John Whiteaker (Illinois politician) =

American politician

Member of the Illinois House of Representatives
- In office 1824–1826

Member of the Illinois Senate
- In office 1828–1832

John Whiteaker was an American politician who served as a member of the Illinois House of Representatives. Whiteaker was a member of the First Illinois Constitutional Convention in 1818. He served as a state representative representing Union County in the 4th Illinois General Assembly, the 6th Illinois General Assembly, and the 7th Illinois General Assembly.
