= Henry Utter =

American politician

Member of the Illinois House of Representatives
- In office 1818–1820
- Succeeded by: Moses Michaels

Member of the Illinois House of Representatives
- In office 1824–1828

Henry Utter was an American politician who served as a member of the Illinois House of Representatives. He served as a state representative representing Edwards County in the 1st Illinois General Assembly and the 4th Illinois General Assembly, and as a state representative representing Wabash County in the 5th Illinois General Assembly.
