= Timothy Gard =

American politician

Member of the Illinois House of Representatives
- In office 1824–1826

Member of the Illinois Senate
- In office 1826–1832

Timothy Gard was an American politician who served as a member of the Illinois Senate and the Illinois House of Representatives. He served as a state representative representing Gallatin County in the 4th Illinois General Assembly; and served as a state senator representing Gallatin County in the 5th, 6th, and the 7th Illinois General Assemblies.

He unsuccessfully ran as representative from Gallatin County in the 2nd Illinois General Assembly. He won as one of two representatives for Gallatin County in August 2, 1824 election; and then defeated Michael Jones in the August 7, 1826 election for state senator (4 year term) representing Gallatin county. In the August 2, 1830 election, he defeated Jones again for the same seat (2 year term).

His surname has been incorrectly rendered as Guard in official sources.
