= 1830 Ecuadorian Constitutional Assembly election =

- 1830

Constitutional Assemnbly elections were held in Ecuador in 1830 to elect members of the Assembly to draft a new constitution. The formation of the Assembly was ordered by Juan José Flores to consolidate and legislate the independence of Ecuador from Gran Colombia.

== List of provincial representatives ==
=== Cuenca ===
Representatives
Ignacio Torres y Tenorio
José María Landa y Ramírez
José María Borrero Baca
Mariano Veintimilla y Racines

=== Chimborazo ===
Representatives
Juan Bernardo León y Cevallos
Nicolás Váscones y López-Naranjo

=== Guayaquil ===
Representatives
José Joaquín de Olmedo y Maruri
León de Febres Cordero y Oberto
Vicente Ramón Roca Rodríguez
Francisco de Marcos y Crespo

=== Loja ===
Representatives
José María Lequerica y Riofrío
Miguel Ignacio Valdivieso Carrión

=== Manabí ===
Representatives
Manuel Ribadeneyra y García
Manuel Ignacio García Moreno
Cayetano Ramírez y Fita

=== Pichincha ===
Representatives
José Fernández Salvador López
Nicolás Joaquín de Arteta y Calisto
Manuel Matheu y Herrera
Manuel Espinoza y Fominaya
Antonio Ante y López de la Flor

== See also ==
- Elections in Ecuador
