= James Adams (Mormon) =

American lawyer (1783–1843)

James Adams (January 24, 1783 – August 11, 1843) was a nineteenth-century Illinois lawyer and close friend of Joseph Smith, founder of the Church of Jesus Christ of Latter Day Saints.

== Biography ==
James Adams, the son of Parmenio Adams and Cleo Nering, was born on January 24, 1783, at Simsbury, Connecticut. He married Harriet Denton (1787–1844) in 1809 at Hartford, Connecticut, and later moved to Oswego, New York. He served in the United States Army during the War of 1812. In 1821 he settled in Springfield, Illinois where he became a pioneer attorney of Sangamon County. He was elected justice of the peace in 1823. He served in the Winnebago War in 1827, as well as the Black Hawk War in 1831-1832. Because of his military service he was often addressed as "General Adams." He was an unsuccessful candidate for Governor of Illinois in 1834. He participated in a long-running newspaper battle with Abraham Lincoln beginning in May 1837, over the transfer of a city lot. He was made a probate judge in 1841. He was also longstanding member of the Masonic fraternity. He was the first Worshipful Master of Springfield Lodge No. 4 A.F.& A.M. in Springfield, Illinois in 1839. He also formed the current Grand Lodge of Illinois on April 6, 1840.

== Association with the Latter Day Saint movement ==
It is not known how Adams came into contact with the Latter Day Saint movement, but he converted in 1836. He apparently first met Joseph Smith in 1839, when the Latter Day Saint prophet preached in Springfield in November 1839, when he was on his way to Washington, D.C. Adams invited Smith to his home. The meeting of the two resulted in an enduring friendship; upon meeting Adams, Smith wrote in his diary that he "treated me like a father."

Upon his conversion Adams became active in local Mormon affairs, serving as the leader of the Springfield Mormon congregation as branch president. He was also ordained a patriarch by Smith, probably in 1843; a few of his patriarchal blessings have survived from that year.

As the Deputy Grand Master of the Masonic Grand Lodge of Illinois (1840 to 1843), he was instrumental in establishing Freemasonry among the Mormons, participating in the installation of the Nauvoo Masonic Lodge in 1842.

Eventually, Adams's friendship with Smith brought him into the Mormon prophet's inner circle, those whom he initiated into Nauvoo's most sacred doctrines practices. Even though Adams resided in Springfield, Smith invited him to come to Nauvoo so that he would be included among those men first to receive the endowment, a Mormon temple ritual. He was the only person among the group not from Nauvoo. On May 4, 1842, Smith introduced the ceremony to Adams and eight men, who formed the nucleus of the Anointed Quorum. Until Smith's death in 1844 he brought others into this elite group, admitting both men and women, until it included over fifty persons. Adams' wife, Harriet, was endowed and admitted into the Anointed Quorum on October 8, 1843. Adams attended the group's meetings whenever he was in Nauvoo.

Smith also included Adams in Nauvoo's most clandestine and controversial practice, eternal marriage and polygamy. On the day (May 28, 1843) that Smith was sealed to his wife, Emma, in eternal marriage, Smith also sealed Adams's for time and eternity. This was not the end of Adams's eternal marriages. Five weeks later, July 11, Smith performed a plural marriage sealing for 38-year-old Roxanna Rephsire to Adams.

Upon an appointment to Hancock County's probate court in 1843, Adams prepared to move to Nauvoo, a move that would bring him into even closer association with Smith. In the midst of his preparations he contracted cholera and died suddenly on August 11, 1843 in Springfield, Illinois. His remains were interred in the Old Pioneer Cemetery, Nauvoo, Illinois. Harriet followed her husband, dying a year later (August 21, 1844) at Springfield, where she was interred.
