= George Hunsacker =

American politician

Member of the Illinois Senate
- In office 1826–1830
- Succeeded by: John Grammer

George Hunsacker was an American politician who served as a member of the Illinois Senate.

On August 7, 1826, he won in the general election to serve a 4-year term as state senator for the district comprising Alexander, Johnson, and Union counties spanning the 5th and 6th Illinois General Assemblies. He failed to win relection to the same seat in 1832 being defeated by John Grammer.
