= 1830 Connecticut lieutenant gubernatorial election =

- April 8, 1830
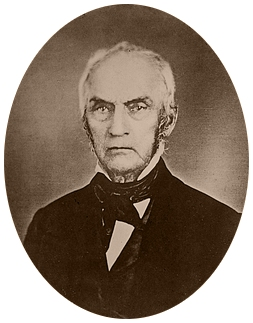

Nominee	John Samuel Peters	Ingoldsby W. Crawford	William J. Williams
Party	National Republican	National Republican	Independent
Popular vote	6,861	2,923	2,806
Percentage	53.50%	22.80%	21.90%
Lieutenant Governor before election
John Samuel Peters
National Republican
Elected Lieutenant Governor
John Samuel Peters
National Republican

The 1830 Connecticut lieutenant gubernatorial election was held on April 8, 1830, in order to elect the lieutenant governor of Connecticut. Incumbent National Republican lieutenant governor John Samuel Peters won re-election against National Republican candidate Ingoldsby W. Crawford, Independent candidate William J. Williams and several others.

== General election ==
On election day, April 8, 1830, incumbent National Republican lieutenant governor John Samuel Peters won re-election with 53.50% of the vote, thereby retaining National Republican control over the office of lieutenant governor. Peters was sworn in for his fourth term on May 5, 1830.

=== Results ===
Connecticut lieutenant gubernatorial election, 1830
Party	Candidate	Votes	%
National Republican	John Samuel Peters (incumbent)	6,861	53.50
National Republican	Ingoldsby W. Crawford	2,923	22.80
Independent	William J. Williams	2,806	21.90
	Scattering	181	1.80
Total votes		12,821	100.00
National Republican hold			
