= Adam W. Snyder =

American politician

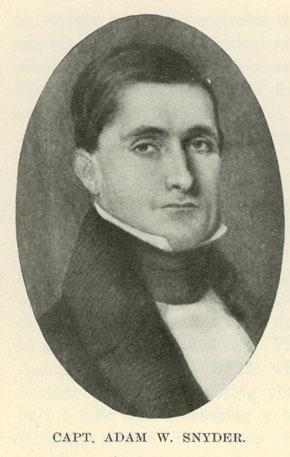

Member of the U.S. House of Representatives from Illinois's 1st district
- In office March 4, 1837 – March 3, 1839
- Preceded by: John Reynolds
- Succeeded by: John Reynolds

Member of the Illinois Senate
- In office 1832
- In office 1830

Personal details
- Born: Adam Wilson Snyder; October 6, 1799 Connellsville, Pennsylvania, U.S.
- Died: May 14, 1842 (aged 42) Belleville, Illinois, U.S.
- Party: Democratic

Adam Wilson Snyder (October 6, 1799 – May 14, 1842) was a U.S. representative from Illinois as well as a member of the Illinois militia during the Black Hawk War.

== Early life ==
Adam W. Snyder was born in Connellsville, Pennsylvania on October 6, 1799. He moved to Cahokia, Illinois in 1817 and studied law. By 1820 he had been admitted to the bar and commenced practicing in Cahokia. He was appointed prosecuting attorney for the first judicial district in 1822, a position which he resigned in 1823. In the lead up to the Black Hawk War, from 1824 to 1832 Snyder worked in agriculture.

== Black Hawk War and political career ==
In December 1830, Snyder won a special election for Illinois Senate in the 6th Illinois General Assembly to fill the seat of Risdon Moore Jr. who died before the 2nd session of his term started. He was reelected in 1832. During the Black Hawk War he served as a captain in the Illinois militia. During the war he was involved as a commander at the first Battle of Kellogg's Grove. He moved to Belleville, Illinois in 1833 where he was an unsuccessful candidate for election in 1834 to the 24th United States Congress. Adam Wilson Snyder was eventually elected as a Democrat to the 25th U.S. Congress and served from March 4, 1837–March 3, 1839. He was not a candidate for renomination in 1838.

Following his time in national office Snyder was again elected to the Illinois Senate in 1840 but resigned in 1841. He was nominated as a candidate for Governor of Illinois, but died in Belleville before the election. He was interred in nearby Green Mount Cemetery.

== Notes ==
U.S. House of Representatives
Preceded by John Reynolds	Member of the U.S. House of Representatives from Illinois's 1st congressional district 1837-1839	Succeeded by John Reynolds
