= Joseph A. Beaird =

American politician

Member of the Illinois Senate
- In office 1822–1828
- Preceded by: Alexander Jamison
- Succeeded by: Samuel McRoberts

Joseph A. Beaird was an American politician who served as a member of the Illinois Senate. He served as a state senator representing Monroe County in the 3rd, 4th and 5th General Assemblies. He died in office.
