= Samuel Crawford (Illinois politician) =

American politician

Member of the Illinois Senate
- In office 1828–1832

Samuel Crawford was an American politician who served as a member of the Illinois Senate.

In the August 4, 1828 general election, he was elected to a 4-year term as state senator to Randolph county and the newly formed Perry county which spanned the 6th and 7th Illinois general assemblies.
