= William Kinney (Illinois politician) =

American politician

3rd Lieutenant Governor of Illinois
- In office December 6, 1826 – December 9, 1830
- Governor: Ninian Edwards
- Preceded by: Adolphus Hubbard
- Succeeded by: Zadok Casey

Member of the Illinois Senate from the St. Clair County district
- In office 1818–1820
- Preceded by: Inaugural holder
- Succeeded by: James Lemen Jr.
- In office 1822–1824
- Preceded by: James Lemen Jr.
- Succeeded by: James Lemen Jr.

Personal details
- Born: 1781 Near Louisville, Kentucky
- Died: October 1, 1843 (aged 61–62) St. Clair County, Illinois, U.S.
- Party: Democratic-Republican

William Kinney (1781 – October 1, 1843) was an American pioneer, politician, and merchant who was the third Lieutenant Governor of Illinois. Born in Kentucky, Kinney came to the Illinois Territory at a young age with his family. In 1809, he founded a successful dry goods store on the road between the towns of Belleville and Lebanon. This made him a prominent citizen of St. Clair County, and Kinney was elected to the Illinois Senate when the body was formed in 1818.

In 1826, Kinney was elected Lieutenant Governor under Ninian Edwards. However, Kinney developed a pattern of financial mismanagement during this term that would haunt him for the rest his life. Twice an unsuccessful candidate for Governor of Illinois, Kinney was named president of the state's board of public works. Kinney nearly bankrupted the state by funding ambitious projects in the wake of the Panic of 1837. The board was liquidated and the state was in the process of suing Kinney when he died in 1843.

== Biography ==
Kinney was born near Louisville, Kentucky, in 1781. In 1793, he came to the Indiana Territory with his family, settling in New Design in what is now Monroe County, Illinois. Kinney married when he was nineteen and his wife helped to teach him how to read. In 1803, he built an 80-acre (32 ha) farm 4 miles (6.4 km) northeast of Belleville, on the road to the town of Lebanon. He purchased surrounding land until his estate measured 640 acres (260 ha).

In 1809, a merchant named VonPhul from St. Louis, Missouri, sold Kinney some bolts of cotton cloth with the intent of resale. Kinney established a dry goods store, and it eventually grew to become one of the largest in the area. Kinney converted to the Baptist Church and became a preacher. When the state of Illinois was approved in 1818, Kinney was elected to the 1st Illinois General Assembly in the state senate, serving a two-year term. He was re-elected to the body in 1822 for the 3rd General Assembly. In 1826, Kinney was elected the third Lieutenant Governor of Illinois, serving with Governor Ninian Edwards. Kinney struggled to balance his political and mercantile responsibilities and found himself in financial ruin by the end of his four-year term.

Kinney was an ardent supporter of slavery and was able to maintain a sustainable lifestyle using slave labor in his orchards. He was an early leader in the state's Democratic-Republican Party, then became a Democrat. He ran for Governor of Illinois in 1830, but was defeated by John Reynolds. He again ran for the position in 1834, but was defeated by Joseph Duncan.

In 1836, the state legislature elected Kinney to the Illinois Board of Public Works, who promptly named him president of the organization. He made many poor investments, worsened by the Panic of 1837, and nearly bankrupted the state. However, Kinney was credited for helping to convince Lyman Trumbull to come from Connecticut to join the board; Trumbull would become one of the most prominent politicians in the state's history. The board was liquidated and the state sued Kinney for concealing funds.

=== Personal life ===
Kinney had three sons and three daughters. Eldest son Samuel graduated from the United States Military Academy but died of consumption. Second son George D. served in the Black Hawk War but died shortly afterward. Youngest son William C. was a successful lawyer in Belleville who married the daughter of Elias Kane and served in the Illinois House of Representatives. Kinney's eldest daughter married politician John Thomas, who served in both state houses. Kinney died on October 1, 1843, at his home in St. Clair County. Kinney was buried in Shiloh Valley Cemetery in Shiloh, Illinois. Early Oregon politician Robert Crouch Kinney was his nephew.

Party political offices
First	Democratic nominee for Governor of Illinois; 1830, 1834	Succeeded by Thomas Carlin
Political offices
Preceded by Adolphus Hubbard	Lieutenant Governor of Illinois; 1826-1830	Succeeded by Zadok Casey
