= Revill W. English =

American politician

Member of the Illinois House of Representatives
- In office 1836–1842

Revill W. English (also spelled Revel) was an American politician who served as a member of the Illinois House of Representatives.

On August 1, 1836, he was elected as one of three state representatives to represent Greene County in the 10th Illinois General Assembly and on August 6, 1838, he was again one of three elected to represent Greene County in 11th Illinois General Assembly. On August 3, 1840, he was elected to represent Greene County and Jersey County in the 12th Illinois General Assembly.

In the August 1, 1842 election, he was elected to a two-year term as state senator to represent Greene and Calhoun counties in the 13th Illinois General Assembly which created a dilemma as Alfred W. Cavarly had simultaneously been elected to represent the newly formed district of Greene and Jersey counties creating one too many senators, the result of a clumsily written Apportionment Act of 1841. The full Senate determined that neither was duly elected although the matter was made moot as English honorably resigned and Cavarly was allowed to be seated as there was no opposition. In the August 5, 1844 election, English ran for the same seat against Cavarly but was defeated.
