= Risdon Moore Jr. =

American politician

Member of the Illinois Senate
- In office 1828–1829
- Preceded by: James Lemen Jr.
- Succeeded by: Adam W. Snyder

Risdon Moore Jr. was an American politician who served as a member of the Illinois Senate. Pro slavery in stance, he ran for state representative representing St. Clair County in the 1824 election but was defeated by his anti-slavery cousin, Risdon Moore. He later served as a state senator representing St. Clair County in the 6th Illinois General Assembly. He died before the 2nd session commenced in the summer of 1829. In December 1830, Adam W. Snyder won a special election for Illinois Senate to fill the seat.
