= Raphael Widen =

American politician

Member of the Illinois Senate from the Randolph County district
- In office 1824 – 1828
- Preceded by: Samuel Crozier
- Succeeded by: Samuel Crawford

Member of the Illinois House of Representatives from the Randolph County district
- In office 1820 – 1824

Personal details
- Born: unknown Sweden
- Died: 1833 Kaskaskia, Illinois
- Profession: Justice of the peace

Raphael Widen (died 1833) was an Illinois pioneer and politician. He is thought to have been the first Swedish-American to reside in what would become the state of Illinois. He was first recorded in the state in 1814, when he was appointed a justice of the peace. Widen served four years in the Illinois House of Representatives and four years in the Illinois Senate.

== Biography ==
Raphael Widen's birth date and place are unknown. Little is known of his early life. His family moved from Sweden to France when he was eight so that he could study to be a Catholic priest. He immigrated to the United States at an unknown date. He was the first Swede known to have lived in Illinois.

While living in Cahokia, Illinois Territory, Widen was appointed justice of the peace of St. Clair County on January 12, 1814. In December 1818, he moved to Kaskaskia, where he became a justice in Randolph County. He held the role there until at least 1831. In 1820, he was elected to the Illinois House of Representatives. He served until 1824, when he was elected to the Illinois Senate. He served as President of the Illinois Senate during one of its sessions in January 1826. In the Illinois legislature, Widen was an opponent of slavery. It is thought that Widen met Gilbert du Motier, Marquis de Lafayette in Kaskaskia; Lafayette refers to an "Edward Widen", though this is thought to actually be Raphael.

Raphael Widen married Frances Lalemier in Cahokia, Illinois, in 1818. He died from cholera in Kaskaskia in 1833, after a cholera epidemic came through the area carried by Winfield Scott's troops during the Black Hawk War. His widow afterwards married Capt. E. Walker. She died in Chester, Illinois in 1874. The Chicago History Museum holds eleven of Widen's manuscripts.
