= Charles Slade =

American politician

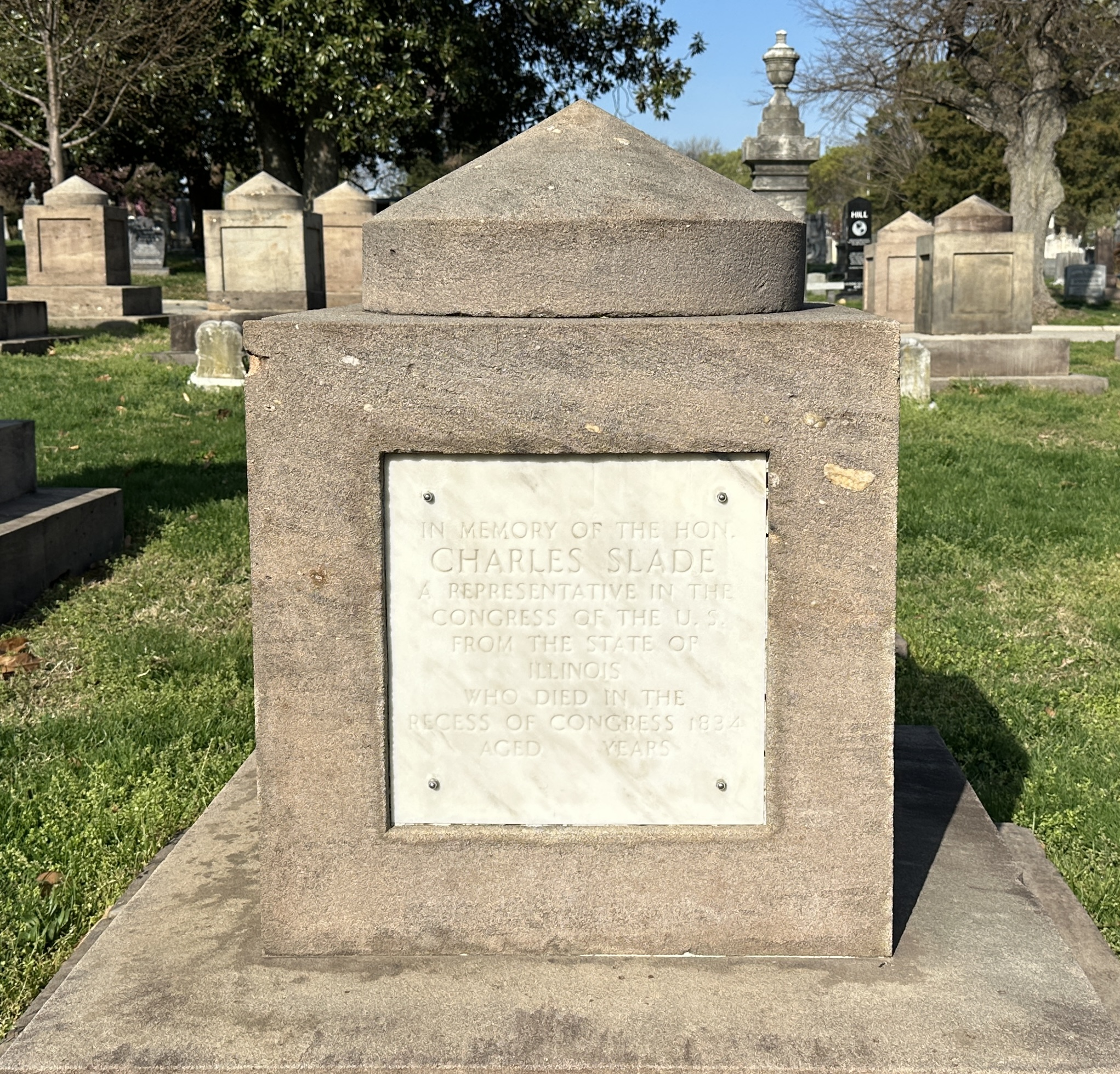
- Slade's cenotaph at Congressional Cemetery

Member of the U.S. House of Representatives from Illinois's 1st district
- In office March 4, 1833 – July 26, 1834
- Preceded by: District established
- Succeeded by: John Reynolds

Member of the Illinois House of Representatives
- In office 1826; 1820

Personal details
- Born: c. 1797 Keynsham, England
- Died: July 26, 1834 (aged 36–37) Vincennes, Indiana, U.S.
- Party: Jacksonian
- Spouse: Mary Kain
- Children: Joseph Alfred Slade

Charles Slade (c. 1797 – July 26, 1834) was a U.S. representative from Illinois.

Born in England, Slade immigrated to the United States with his parents, who settled in Alexandria, Virginia. He attended the public schools. In 1818 he founded the town of Carlyle, Illinois which is named after Slade's grandmother's family. He engaged in mercantile pursuits such as running a store, mill, toll road, tavern, and ferry. He held several local offices. He served as a member of the Illinois House of Representatives, 1820 and 1826. From 1829 to 1833, he served as the United States Marshal for Illinois.

Slade was elected as a Jacksonian to the Twenty-third Congress after defeating former Illinois governor and United States Senator Ninian Edwards, future United States Senator Sidney Breese, and two others. He served from March 4, 1833 until his death near Vincennes, Indiana on July 26, 1834. His death was due to cholera. Due to the nature of the disease, he received a quick Masonic funeral near Vincennes, and his burial site is unknown. There is a cenotaph in his honor in Washington's Congressional Cemetery.

One of his sons was future Western gunfighter Jack Slade. In 1838, Slade's widow, Mary Kain, married future Civil War general Elias Dennis.

== See also ==
- List of members of the United States Congress who died in office (1790–1899)

U.S. House of Representatives
Preceded by District created	Member of the U.S. House of Representatives from Illinois's 1st congressional district 1833-1834	Succeeded by John Reynolds
