= 1830 Illinois gubernatorial election =

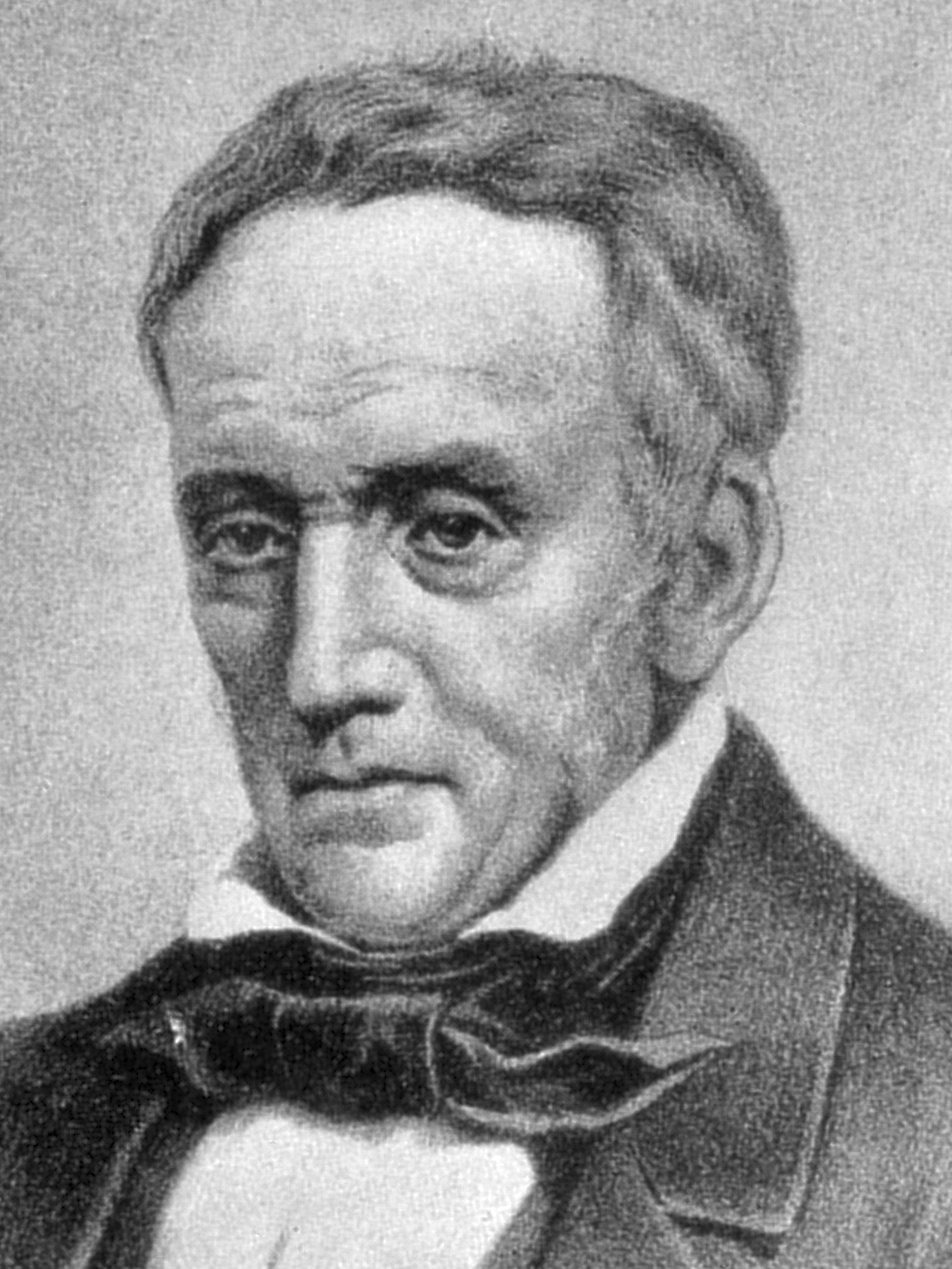

Nominee	John Reynolds	William Kinney
Party	Democratic	Democratic
Popular vote	12,837	8,938
Percentage	58.95%	41.05%
- County results Reynolds: 50–60% 60–70% 70–80% 80–90% Kinney: 50–60% 60–70% 70–80% 80–90% Unknown/No Vote
Governor before election
Ninian Edwards
Democratic-Republican
Elected Governor
John Reynolds
Democratic

The 1830 Illinois gubernatorial election was the fourth quadrennial election for this office. Both candidates were Democrats and supporters of Andrew Jackson. State representative John Reynolds was elected comfortably by a coalition of moderate Jacksonians and anti-Jacksonians, defeating the more radical lieutenant governor William Kinney.

== General election ==
=== Candidates ===
- William Kinney, lieutenant governor of Illinois (Democratic)
- John Reynolds, state representative from Belleville and former justice of the Supreme Court of Illinois (Democratic)

=== Results ===
1830 gubernatorial election, Illinois
Party	Candidate	Votes	%	±%
Democratic	John Reynolds	12,837	58.95	+54.38
Democratic	William Kinney	8,938	41.05	−8.42
Majority		3,899	17.90	N/A
Turnout		21,775		
Democratic gain from Democratic-Republican		Swing		

== See also ==
- 1830 Illinois lieutenant gubernatorial election
