= John Reynolds (Illinois politician) =

American lawyer and politician (1788–1865)

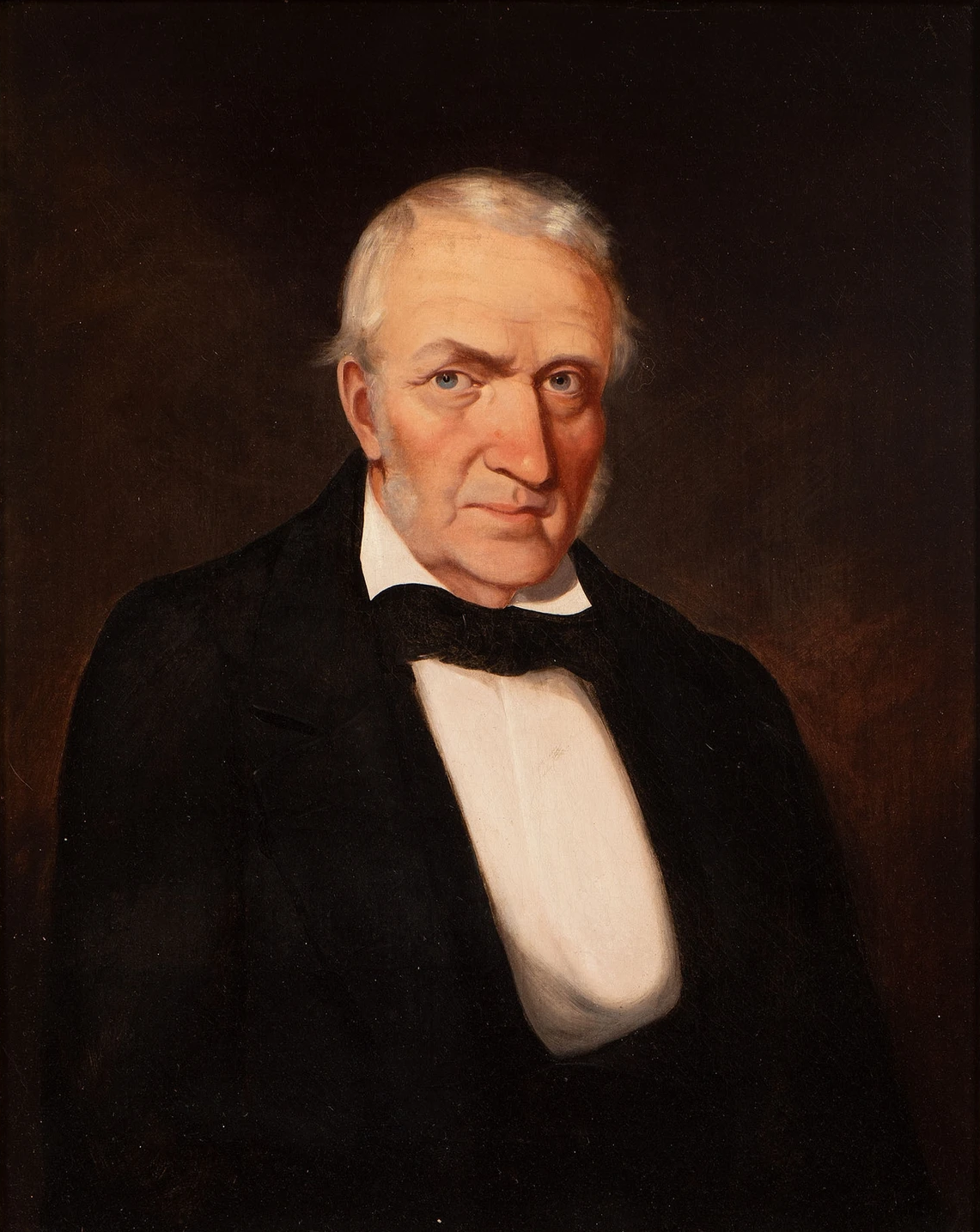
- Portrait by Patrick Henry Davenport, 1860

4th Governor of Illinois
- In office December 6, 1830 – November 17, 1834
- Lieutenant: Zadok Casey; William Lee D. Ewing (acting)
- Preceded by: Ninian Edwards
- Succeeded by: William Lee D. Ewing

Member of the U.S. House of Representatives from Illinois's 1st district
- In office March 4, 1839 – March 3, 1843
- Preceded by: Adam W. Snyder
- Succeeded by: Robert Smith
- In office December 1, 1834 – March 3, 1837
- Preceded by: Charles Slade
- Succeeded by: Adam W. Snyder

Member of the Illinois House of Representatives
- In office 1852–1854
- In office 1846–1848
- In office 1826–1830

Justice of the Illinois Supreme Court
- In office 1818–1825
- Preceded by: Office established
- Succeeded by: Samuel D. Lockwood

Personal details
- Born: February 26, 1788 Montgomery County, Pennsylvania, U.S.
- Died: May 8, 1865 (aged 77) Belleville, Illinois, U.S.
- Party: Democratic
- Spouse: Married twice
- Profession: Politician, lawyer

John M. Reynolds (February 26, 1788 – May 8, 1865) was an American lawyer and politician from the state of Illinois who served in all three governmental branches.

One of the original four justices of the Illinois Supreme Court (1818–1825), Reynolds won several elections to the Illinois House of Representatives (1826–1830, 1846–1848, and 1852–1854, when he was Speaker of the House), United States House of Representatives (1834–1837 and 1839–1843) and the fourth Illinois governorship (1830–1834). He was also a major general in the Illinois militia during the Black Hawk War.

Reynolds published Pioneer History of Illinois and a large autobiography titled My Own Times.

== Early life ==
Reynolds was born in Montgomery County, Pennsylvania. His father, Robert Reynolds and his mother, née Margaret Moore, were both natives of Ireland, from which country they emigrated to the United States in 1785, arriving first at Philadelphia. When Reynolds was about six months old, his parents emigrated with him to Tennessee, where many of their relatives had already located, at the base of the Copper Ridge Mountain, about 14 miles (23 km) northeast of the present city of Knoxville. After experiencing raids from Native Americans, the Reynolds moved into the interior of the state in 1794. They were poor, and brought up their children to habits of manual industry.

In 1800 the family moved to near Kaskaskia, Illinois, where Reynolds spent most of his childhood. As part of his upbringing, he adopted the principle and practice of total abstinence from intoxicating liquors. In 1807 the family made another move, this time to the Goshen Settlement, at the foot of the bluffs overlooking the Mississippi River southwest of Edwardsville.

At the age of twenty, Reynolds attended college for two years near Knoxville, Tennessee, where he had relatives, taking courses in classical studies. He then studied law in Knoxville; health problems forced him back to Illinois, but he afterward returned to college and law in Knoxville. In the fall of 1812 he was admitted to the bar at Kaskaskia, and began practicing law in Cahokia, Illinois, opening his first law office there over the winter of 1813–1814. About this time he also learned the French language, which he regarded as being superior to all others for social intercourse.

== Military service ==
With the ranks of private and orderly sergeant, Reynolds served as a scout in campaigns against the western Native Americans during the War of 1812. He also served as Judge Advocate. For this service, Reynolds became known as the "Old Ranger". In 1814, Reynolds opened a law office in the old French village of Cahokia, then the county seat of St. Clair County.

== Politics ==
In the fall of 1818, John Reynolds was elected an associate justice of the Illinois Supreme Court by the Illinois General Assembly. In 1822, he was joined on the court by Thomas Reynolds, but both were defeated for re-election in 1824; John Reynolds went on to become Governor of Illinois in 1830 and Thomas Reynolds became Governor of Missouri in 1840. Despite some biographies stating that the two men were brothers or uncle and nephew, a 1961 historical journal letter states that the two were not related: John Reynolds had a brother named Thomas Reynolds — or Thomas Michael Reynolds in one of his obituaries — but that brother owned a livery stable and dry goods store in Belleville; neither John nor his brother Thomas were any relation to the Thomas that served with John on the Supreme Court.

In 1818, John Reynolds was an unsuccessful candidate for election to the United States Senate.

In 1824, Reynolds aligned with Shadrach Bond, John McLean, and Elias Kane to advocate for slavery in Illinois. In 1826, influence from party leaders helped him secure a seat in the Illinois House of Representatives for the first time, serving until 1830. Although aligning himself with the Jacksonian Democrats, his moderation earned him respect from both pro-Jackson and anti-Jackson factions.

In August 1830, Reynolds was elected governor of Illinois and took office on December 6, 1830, giving an inaugural address that advocated for free popular education, general internal public improvements, the completion of the Illinois and Michigan Canal, and the improvement of the Chicago harbor. He also advocated and recommended the completion of the first state penitentiary at Alton, at the direct cost of the state. The most significant event of his administration was the Black Hawk War in 1832. He called out the militia, and was field commander, often appearing in person on the battle-grounds. He was recognized by U.S. President Andrew Jackson as Major-General, and was authorized to make treaties with the Native Americans. Asiatic Cholera was a prominent feature of Reynolds' gubernatorial term.

On November 17, 1834, Reynolds resigned as governor, having been elected to the United States House of Representatives for the Twenty-third Congress to fill the vacancy caused by the death of Charles Slade. He was reelected to the Twenty-fourth Congress, serving from December 1, 1834, to March 3, 1837. He was an unsuccessful candidate for reelection in 1836 to the Twenty-fifth Congress. He was subsequently elected to the Twenty-sixth and Twenty-seventh Congresses, serving from March 4, 1839, to March 3, 1843.

In 1837, while out of Congress and in company with a few others, he built the first railroad in the Mississippi Valley, about six miles (10 km) long, leading from his coal mine in the Mississippi bluff to the bank of the river opposite St. Louis. Not having the funds to purchase a locomotive, the railroad was operated by horse-power. The next spring, the company sold out at great loss.

In 1839 Reynolds was appointed one of the Canal Commissioners and traveled to Philadelphia to raise funds for that purpose. During that year, he also made a tour of Europe with his wife. He introduced the Latter-day Saint Prophet, Joseph Smith to President Martin Van Buren when Smith was seeking redress for the grievances that the Latter-day Saints suffered in Missouri. This was done by Reynolds with the hope of winning the votes of the growing number of Latter-day Saints in Illinois in latter political contests.

Reynolds was elected in 1846 for one term as a member of the Illinois House of Representatives from St. Clair County; during this term he caused to be built the first macadamized road in the state, from Belleville to St. Louis. He was an unsuccessful candidate for the Illinois Senate in 1848. He was again elected to the Illinois House in 1852, serving as Speaker of the Illinois House of Representatives.

He was an unsuccessful candidate for Illinois State Superintendent of Schools in 1858, and then engaged in newspaper work.

In 1860, aged and infirm, Reynolds attended the Democratic National Convention in Charleston, South Carolina, as an anti-Douglas delegate, instead supporting John C. Breckinridge in the U.S. presidential election. Against Republican Abraham Lincoln that year, he published his support for Douglas. His correspondence before and during the American Civil War showed a sympathy for secession.

== Views on slavery ==
Reynolds believed that Black people were inferior and benefited from white ownership. In the wake of the 1860 Douglas nomination, he wrote The balm of Gilead: an inquiry into the right of American slavery, arguing that arguments for emancipation were attempts at disunion and an injury toward slaveholding states. Reynolds was known to own slaves and posted a $50 reward the return of an escaped man.

== Personal life ==
Reynolds married twice, to Catherine Dubuque in 1817 and to Sarah E. Wilson in 1836, and had no children. He died in Belleville in May 1865, shortly after the Civil War, and his body was laid there in Walnut Hill Cemetery.

Party political offices
First	National Republican nominee for Governor of Illinois; 1830	Succeeded by None
Political offices
Preceded by Ninian Edwards	Governor of Illinois; 1830–1834	Succeeded by William Lee D. Ewing
U.S. House of Representatives
Preceded by Charles Slade	Member of the U.S. House of Representatives from Illinois's 1st congressional district 1834–1837	Succeeded by Adam W. Snyder
Preceded by Adam W. Snyder	Member of the U.S. House of Representatives from Illinois's 1st congressional district 1839–1843	Succeeded by Robert Smith
