= Elijah Iles =

American businessman and politician (1796–1883)

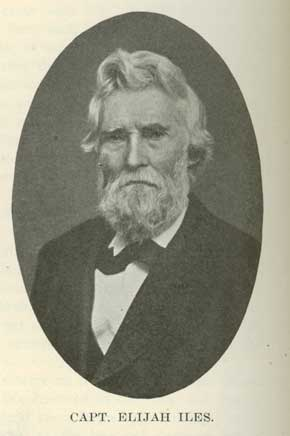

Elijah Iles (March 28, 1796 – September 4, 1883) was an American businessman, pioneer, and politician who was one of the first settlers of Springfield, Illinois. He was elected to the Illinois Senate in 1826 and fought in the Winnebago and Black Hawk Wars. During the latter engagement, Iles commanded future President Abraham Lincoln.

== Biography ==
Elijah Iles was born in Fayette County, Kentucky on March 28, 1796. His father was sheriff of Bath County. With money lent to him from his father, Elijah established a cattle ranch in the eastern part of the state and became wealthy. In 1818, he moved to St. Louis, Missouri Territory to open a store. He settled in Springfield, Illinois in 1821, becoming one of the first three settlers to the town. He opened the first store in the town. Iles was the first postmaster of Springfield. Iles married Melinda Benjamin in 1824. He was elected to the Illinois Senate in 1826 and served through 1834. During his service, he was part of the committee that decided to move the state capital to Springfield. He served as a major during the Winnebago War of 1827. He sold his Springfield store to his protege John Williams in 1830.

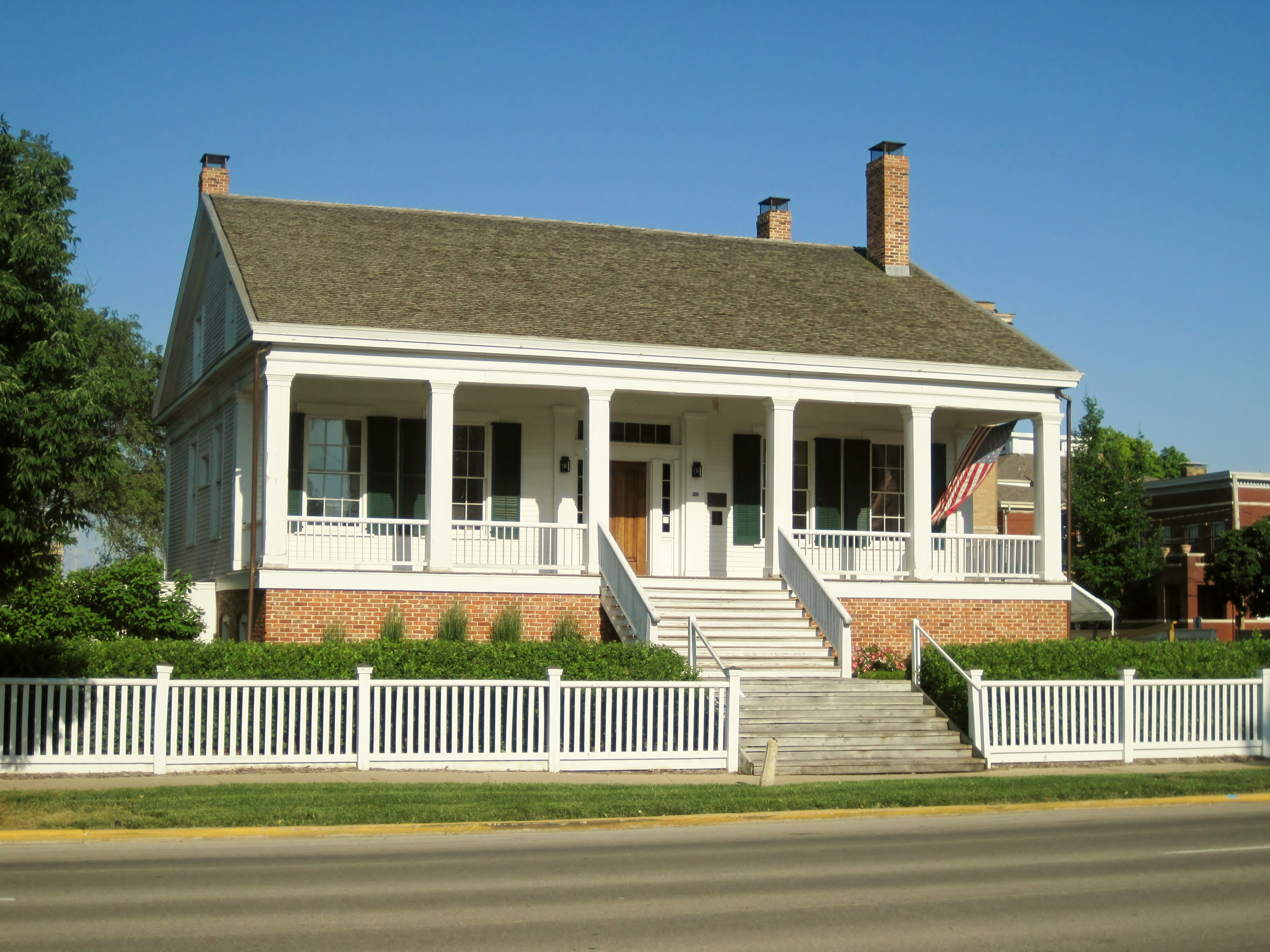
The Elijah Iles House in Springfield

In 1831, he enlisted as a private for the Black Hawk War, later promoted to captain. During his service as captain, Iles led a young Abraham Lincoln in his unit. He built the American House hotel in 1839, the largest hotel in the state, which became a meeting place for early Illinois statesmen. By the time of his death on September 4, 1883, he had accumulated large land holdings. Iles was buried in Oak Ridge Cemetery. Iles' house is now the oldest standing house in Springfield. It was listed on the National Register of Historic Places by the National Park Service on February 23, 1978.

== See also ==
- 5th Illinois General Assembly
- Abraham Lincoln in the Black Hawk War
