= Thomas Mather (politician) =

American Politician

Thomas Mather (1795-1853) was an American politician in Illinois who served in the Illinois House of Representatives and the Illinois Senate.

== Biography ==
Thomas Mather was born April 24, 1795, in Hartford County, Connecticut. He is a direct descendant of the Puritan migrant Increase Mather and his son, Cotton Mather, the influential minister and clergyman. After time in New York, he arrived in southern Illinois around 1820. He was active in business in Kaskaskia, Illinois and helped lay out the town of Chester, Illinois. He was elected to the Illinois House of Representatives from Randolph County, Illinois. After serving in the Illinois House during the Second and Third General Assemblies, he was elected Speaker of the Fourth General Assembly on November 15, 1824. He was a fierce opponent of slavery and bitterly fought the call for a pro-slavery constitutional convention in 1824. He resigned shortly after to accept a position to locate a military road from Independence, Missouri, to Santa Fe, New Mexico. He served another House term in the Sixth General Assembly. He was then elected to the Illinois Senate for the Eighth and Ninth General Assemblies.

On May 11, 1835, Mather resigned from the Senate to take the role of President at the recently chartered State Bank of Illinois. He remained involved in social causes including the hosting of Dorothea Dix when she came to Illinois to persuade the legislature to build a hospital for the mentally ill. His interest in higher education led him to serve as a trustee of Illinois College in Jacksonville, Illinois, and to give generous financial support to that and other institutions of learning.

Mather died on a visit to Philadelphia on March 28, 1853. After his death, Mather's widow sold their Springfield house property to the State of Illinois, which converted the land into a portion of the present capitol grounds.
