= Daniel Hay =

American politician

Member of the Illinois Senate from the White County district
- In office 1824 – 1828

Personal details
- Born: May 18, 1781 Prince Edward County, Virginia
- Died: January 19, 1853 (aged 71)
- Profession: County sheriff

Daniel Hay (May 18, 1781 – January 19, 1853) was an American politician and co-founder of Carmi, Illinois. Born in Virginia, Hay came with his family to Kentucky at a young age. Shortly after his service in the War of 1812, Hay decided to establish a homestead in Illinois. While traversing to his preferred location, he decided instead to help establish Carmi in White County. He was elected the first county sheriff, then served two terms in the Illinois Senate. He spent the rest of his life working to ensure pension payments and operating a store with his son.

== Biography ==
Daniel Hay was born in Prince Edward County, Virginia on May 18, 1781. In 1788, his family moved to Bourbon County, Kentucky. Thirteen years later, they moved to Butler County, Kentucky. In 1813, Hay volunteered in a Kentucky regiment for the War of 1812. Three years later he moved to the Illinois Territory, intending to settle in Sangamon County. Shortly after crossing the Ohio River, he spent the night in Equality, Illinois. There, he met James Racliffe, Willis Hargrave, and others who convinced him to help establish the town of Carmi, Illinois. Hay purchased a lot there and brought his family over from Kentucky, arriving October 31, 1816.

Hay was elected the first sheriff of White County, Illinois in 1818, serving three two-year terms. He purchased a farm 5 miles (8.0 km) west of Carmi in 1820 and moved his family there. In 1824, he was then elected to the Illinois Senate, where he served two two-year terms. From 1825 to 1929, he was contracted to move mail from Shawneetown to Vandalia via Carmi and Fairfield. He eventually delegated the service to his sons until the contract expired in 1842.

Hay moved back to Carmi in 1831, maintaining a hotel and ferry. That year, he was also appointed a United States Pension Agent, holding the position for eleven years. He returned to his farm in 1832–33. After his pension role expired, he worked to prosecute claims for pensioners. With his son William, he founded the store of D. & W. L. Hay, which opened in 1840. He turned over his share of ownership to William in 1848. He again returned to Carmi in 1847 after most of his children were grown. That year, he was elected to the Convention of 1848, commissioned to revise the Constitution of Illinois.

Hay married Priscilla Robbins in 1809. They had ten children: eight sons and two daughters. Hay died on January 19, 1853.
