= Zadok Casey =

American politician

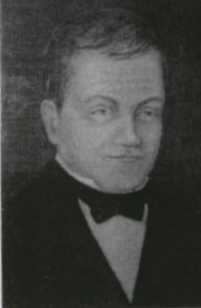

Member of the U.S. House of Representatives from Illinois's 2nd district
- In office March 4, 1833 – March 3, 1843
- Preceded by: District created
- Succeeded by: John Alexander McClernand

4th Lieutenant Governor of Illinois
- In office December 9, 1830 – March 1, 1833
- Governor: John Reynolds
- Preceded by: William Kinney
- Succeeded by: William Lee D. Ewing

14th Speaker of the Illinois House of Representatives
- In office January 1, 1849 – January 6, 1851
- Preceded by: Newton Cloud
- Succeeded by: Sidney Breese

Personal details
- Born: March 7, 1796 Greene County, Georgia, U.S.
- Died: September 4, 1862 (aged 66) Caseyville, Illinois, U.S.
- Party: Independent Democrat

Zadok Casey (March 7, 1796 – September 4, 1862) was an American politician who served as a U.S. representative from Illinois and founded the city of Mount Vernon, Illinois.

== Biography ==
Zadok Casey was born in Greene County, Georgia. Not much is known about his early life, but many accounts attest to his father, Randolph Casey, serving in the Revolutionary War alongside Francis Marion before moving the Casey family to Tennessee in 1800. The younger Casey came to Illinois in 1817 with his wife, son, and widowed mother. He was a founder of the city of Mount Vernon around 1817. A Wesleyan, Casey spent some time as a preacher starting in his youth, and he helped to establish the Society of the Methodist Episcopal Church in Mount Vernon where he preached the church's first services.

In 1819, Casey played a major role in the organization of Jefferson County, Illinois and started his officeholding career by serving on its first Board of County Commissioners. After failing to win an election to the Illinois House of Representatives in 1820, he secured victories to the Illinois House in the 1822 and 1824 elections. In 1826, he won a seat in the Illinois Senate where he served until 1830 when he was elected as Illinois's fourth Lieutenant Governor. Following the 1830 United States Census, Illinois was apportioned three seats, an increase of two seats. Casey successfully ran for a seat in the United States House of Representatives for the newly created second district in the election of 1832. During his time in Congress, Casey was able to help secure a land grant to finance the creation of the Illinois Central Railroad. He served for five terms in office before losing re-election in 1842 to John A. McClernand.

Originally serving as a Jacksonian Democrat during his first four terms, he served his final term in the House of Representatives as an Independent Democrat. After defeat, he served as a delegate to the state constitutional conventions of 1847 and 1862. While serving in the Illinois House of Representatives, Casey had also voted in support of a proposed state constitutional convention in 1824. Supporters of this convention were attempting to draft a constitution that would allow for the expansion of slavery in Illinois. The document drafted at 1862 convention is sometimes referred to as the "Copperhead Constitution" in reference to the dominance of anti-Lincoln administration Democrats at the convention. He again served in the Illinois House from 1848 to 1852, serving as speaker from 1849 to 1851, and again in the Illinois State Senate from 1860 to 1862.

Casey's popularity among his neighbors was such that in his State House elections in 1822 and 1824, as well as his election as Lieutenant Governor in 1830 received the support of every voter in Jefferson County other than his own vote. He died in Caseyville, Illinois at age 66, and was interred at Old Union Cemetery in Mount Vernon.

== Caseyville, Illinois ==
Caseyville, Illinois, was named after Zadok Casey due to his help to finance what eventually became the Ohio and Mississippi Railway (later operated by CSX Transportation) which ran through the center of town. Casey Creek, a tributary of the Big Muddy River, is also named for him, as are Casey Middle School and Casey Avenue in Mount Vernon.

Political offices
Preceded by William Kinney	Lieutenant Governor of Illinois; 1830–1833	Succeeded by William Lee D. Ewing
U.S. House of Representatives
Preceded by District created	Member of the U.S. House of Representatives from Illinois's 2nd congressional district 1833–1843	Succeeded by John A. McClernand
