= William Lee D. Ewing =

American politician

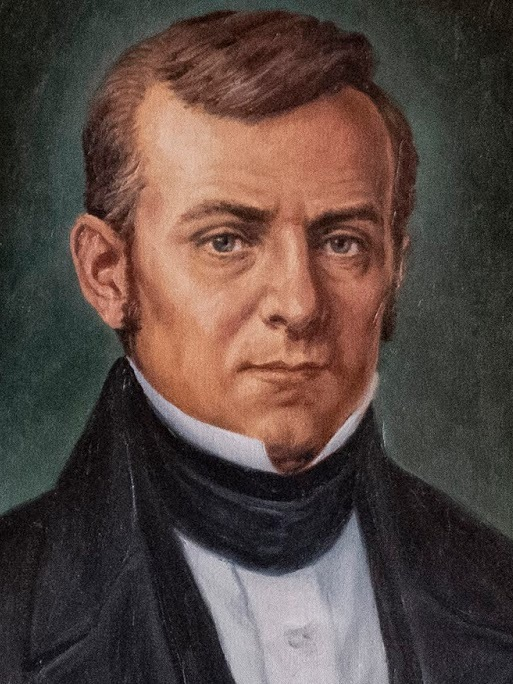

United States Senator from Illinois
- In office December 30, 1835 – March 3, 1837
- Appointed by: Joseph Duncan
- Preceded by: Elias Kane
- Succeeded by: Richard M. Young

5th Governor of Illinois
- In office November 17, 1834 – December 3, 1834
- Lieutenant: Himself
- Preceded by: John Reynolds
- Succeeded by: Joseph Duncan

5th Lieutenant Governor of Illinois
- In office March 1, 1833 – December 5, 1834
- Governor: John Reynolds
- Preceded by: Zadok Casey
- Succeeded by: Alexander M. Jenkins

Member of the Illinois Senate
- In office 1832–1834

Member of the Illinois House of Representatives
- In office 1830–1832

Personal details
- Born: August 31, 1795 Paris, Kentucky, U.S.
- Died: March 25, 1846 (aged 50) Springfield, Illinois, U.S.
- Party: Democratic
- Spouse: Caroline L. Berry (m. 1827)
- Profession: Lawyer

Military service
- Branch/service: Illinois Militia
- Rank: Major General
- Battles/wars: Black Hawk War

William Lee Davidson Ewing (August 31, 1795 – March 25, 1846) was a politician from Illinois who served partial terms as the fifth governor of the state and as U.S. Senator.

== Biography ==
Ewing was born in Paris, Kentucky on August 31, 1795, and practiced law in Shawneetown, Illinois. James Monroe appointed him to be a land office receiver in Vandalia in 1820.

He married Caroline L. Berry on May 3, 1827.

He served as a Colonel of the "Spy Battalion" during the Black Hawk War. In 1830, he was elected to serve in the state House of Representatives as Speaker. He had previously been the clerk of the House. From 1832 to 1834, he was a State Senator, serving as President pro tempore of the State Senate in 1832. In 1833, he was also named acting Lieutenant Governor of Illinois and served as Governor of Illinois for fourteen days in 1834, the shortest gubernatorial term in Illinois history.

Upon the death of Elias Kane in 1835, Ewing was appointed by Joseph Duncan to serve out the rest of Kane's term in the U.S. Senate. In 1838 he was appointed Commissioner to adjust the claims of mixed-bloods and traders at Fort Snelling for the Dakota under the 1837 Dakota treaty. His re-election campaign was unsuccessful and he returned to the Illinois State House, becoming Speaker of the House again.

He died at his home in Springfield, Illinois on March 25, 1846.

Political offices
Preceded by John McLean	Speaker of the Illinois House of Representatives; 1830–1832	Succeeded by Alexander M. Jenkins
Preceded by Zadok Casey	Lieutenant Governor of Illinois; 1833–1834	Succeeded by Alexander M. Jenkins
Preceded by John Reynolds	Governor of Illinois; 1834	Succeeded by Joseph Duncan
Preceded by James Semple	Speaker of the Illinois House of Representatives; 1838–1842	Succeeded by Samuel Hackleton
Preceded by James Shields	Illinois Auditor of Public Accounts; 1843–1846	Succeeded by Thomas Hayes Campbell
U.S. Senate
Preceded by Elias K. Kane	U.S. senator (Class 3) from Illinois; 1835–1837; Served alongside: John M. Robinson	Succeeded by Richard M. Young
