= Conrad Will (politician) =

American physician, politician, and pioneer (1779–1835)

Member of the Illinois Senate from the Jackson County district
- In office 1818 – 1820
- Preceded by: Inaugural holder
- In office 1828 – 1836
- Succeeded by: Braxton Parrish

Member of the Illinois House of Representatives from the Jackson County district
- In office 1820 – 1828

Personal details
- Born: June 3, 1779 Near Philadelphia, Pennsylvania
- Died: June 12, 1835 (aged 56) Near Brownsville, Illinois
- Profession: Physician

Conrad Will (June 3, 1779 – June 12, 1835) was an American medical doctor, politician, and pioneer who is the namesake of Will County, Illinois. Born in Pennsylvania, Will studied medicine in a town in the western portion of the state before moving to Illinois. His farm in Jackson County, Illinois became the first county seat there. Will co-authored the Constitution of Illinois in 1818 and then served in the Illinois Senate for the 1st Illinois General Assembly. Will remained in one of the two houses of the general assembly until his death. The following year, Will County was named in his honor.

== Biography ==
Conrad Will was born near Philadelphia, Pennsylvania on June 3, 1779. He was the sixth of ten children born to Daniel and Maria Will. As a youth, Will helped his father on the family farm. He attended a subscription school during winters and took an interest in medicine. He attended a medical school in Philadelphia and graduated with a doctor's degree. He moved west to Somerset County, Pennsylvania to establish a practice.

In the early 1810s, Will decided to strike out as a pioneer and decided to visit the Illinois Territory. Impressed with the region, he returned home then moved his family to Kaskaskia. Arriving in the spring of 1815, he found a suitable location on the Big Muddy River in southern Randolph County to live, building a double room log cabin. He obtained a license to practice medicine for 40 miles (64 km) around him.

In 1816, Will purchased some kettles and began to manufacture salt from a spring near his farm, but the venture was unsuccessful. When Jackson County, Illinois was created later that year, Will's farm was named the county seat as Brownsville. Will was named one of the first county commissioners. Will was one of two representatives from Jackson County at the Convention of 1818, which wrote the first Constitution of Illinois. Following its approval, Will was named the first state senator from the county, making him one of the fourteen at the 1st Illinois General Assembly. The next term he was elected to the Illinois House of Representatives, where he served until returning to the Senate in 1828. While serving in the House of Representatives in 1823, Will issued a minority report in response to Governor Coles' request for legislation to eliminate slavery in the state; Will argued that Illinois lacked the authority to abrogate slavery and recommended that the state convene a constitutional convention in which delegates might remove restrictions on slavery as they saw fit, repeatedly urging the possibility of expanding slavery within the state. He served in the upper house until his death in 1835.

Will married Susanah Kimmel in 1804. In his free time, Will liked to hunt. He also collected timber, soil, flowers, and fruits. He died near Brownsville on June 12, 1835. The following December, the Illinois General Assembly unanimously passed legislation dedicating thirty days of mourning in the assembly. On January 12, 1836, the legislature created a new county from the lower portion of Cook County. The new county was named Will County in his honor.
