= James Simms =

James Simms may refer to:

- James Simms (Illinois politician), 19th century Illinois state representative
- James Simms (instrument maker) (1828–1915), British instrument maker
- James Simms (Newfoundland official) (1779–1863), lawyer and merchant in Newfoundland
- James M. Simms (1823–?), African-American minister, newspaper publisher and member of the Georgia Assembly
- James P. Simms (1837–1887), Confederate States Army general and member of the Georgia legislature

== See also ==
- James Sims (disambiguation)
