= 16th Illinois General Assembly =

Meeting of the Illinois state legislature from 1848 to 1850

The 16th Illinois General Assembly, consisting of the Illinois Senate and the Illinois House of Representatives, met from January 1, 1849, to February 12, 1849 (1st session); and from October 22, 1849, to November 7, 1849 (2nd session).

The 16th General Assembly was preceded by the 15th Illinois General Assembly, and was succeeded by the 17th Illinois General Assembly.

The Constitution of 1848, fixed the Senate at twenty-five members and the House at seventy-five members. The Constitution of 1848 also divided the state into 25 Senate districts and 54 House districts.

== Senate ==
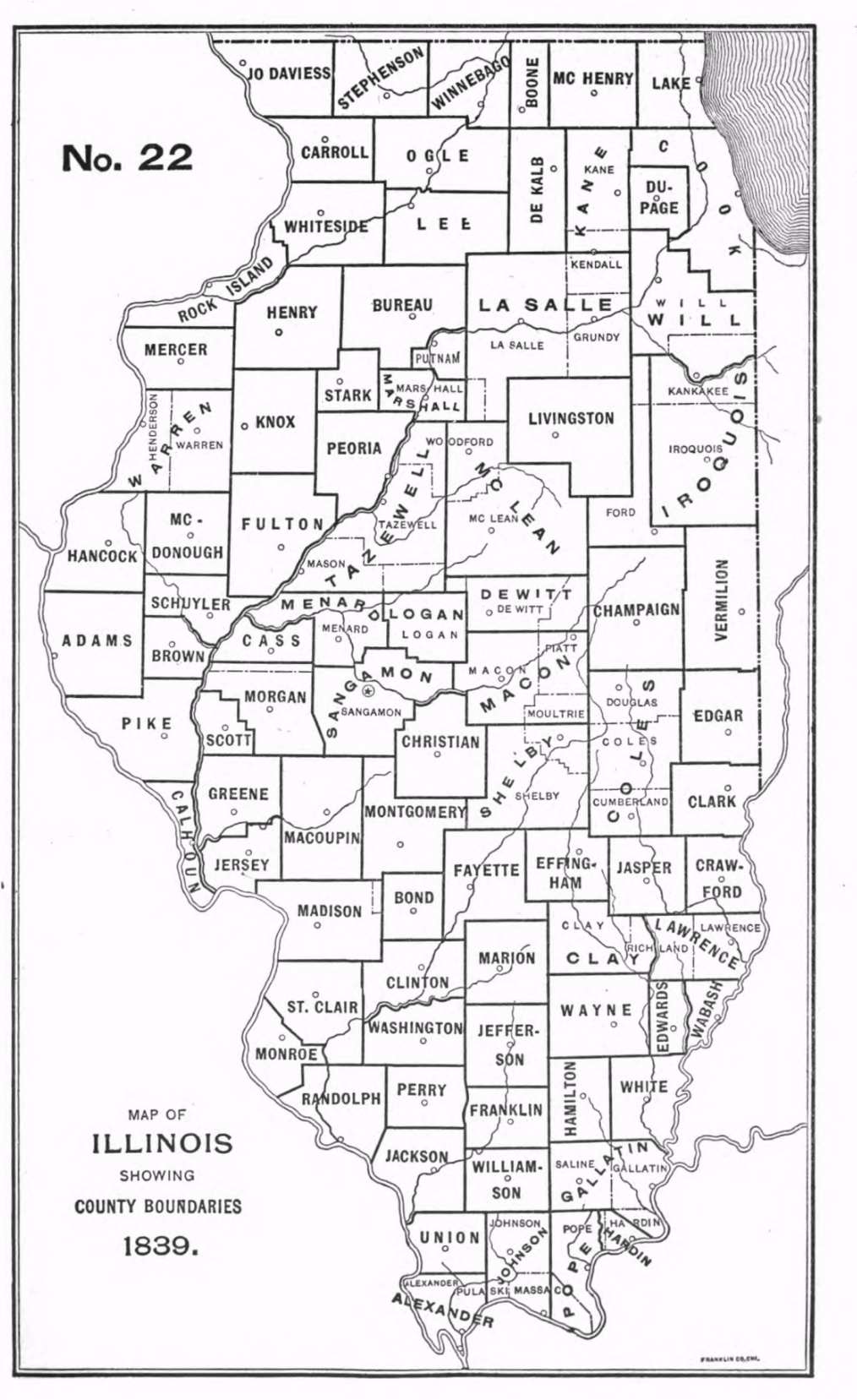
Map of Illinois county boundaries in 1839

District	Counties represented	Image	Senator	Remarks
1	Alexander · Hardin · Johnson · Massac · Pope · Pulaski · Union		William Y. Davis	
2	Franklin · Gallatin · Saline · White · Williamson		Dempsey Odam	
3	Hamilton · Jefferson · Marion · Wayne		Jeduth P. Hardy	
4	Jackson · Perry · Randolph · Washington		Hawkins S. Osburn	
5	Monroe · St. Clair		J. L. D. Morrison	
6	Clinton · Madison		Joseph Gillespie	
7	Bond · Christian · Fayette · Montgomery · Shelby		Hiram Roundtree	
8	Clay · Edwards · Effingham · Jasper · Lawrence · Richland · Wabash		Alfred H. Grass	
9	Clark · Crawford · Edgar		William Clinton Tichenor	Resigned, replaced by Manly
9	Clark · Crawford · Edgar		Uri Manly	2nd session, replaced Tichenor
10	Champaign · Coles · Cumberland · Moultrie · Piatt · Vermilion		Josiah McRoberts	
11	DeWitt · Logan · Macon · McLean · Tazewell		Edward O. Smith	
12	Mason · Menard · Sangamon		John T. Stuart	
13	Calhoun · Greene · Jersey · Macoupin		Franklin Witt	
14	Cass · Morgan · Scott		Newton Cloud	
15	Adams · Pike		Hugh L. Sutphin	
16	Brown · McDonough · Schuyler		John P. Richmond	
17	Hancock · Henderson		Azro Patterson	
18	Fulton · Peoria		David Markley	
19	Henry · Knox · Mercer · Rock Island · Stark · Warren		John Denny	
20	Bureau · Grundy · LaSalle · Livingston · Marshall · Putnam · Woodford		William Reddick	
21	DuPage · Iroquois · Kendall · Will		Joel A. Matteson	
22	DeKalb · Kane · Lee · Ogle		William B. Plato	
23	Carroll · Jo Daviess · Stephenson · Whiteside		Hezekiah H. Gear	
24	Boone · McHenry · Winnebago		Alfred E. Ames	
25	Cook · Lake		Norman B. Judd	

=== House ===
District	Counties represented	Image	Representative	Remarks
1	Alexander · Pulaski · Union		John Cochran	
2	Hardin · Massac · Pope		Wesley Sloan	
3	Gallatin · Saline		David J. Blackman	
4	Johnson · Williamson		David Y. Bridges	
5	Franklin · Jackson		Richard A. Bradley	
6	Hamilton · Jefferson · Marion · Wayne		James J. Richardson	
6	Hamilton · Jefferson · Marion · Wayne		John A. Campbell	
6	Hamilton · Jefferson · Marion · Wayne		Zadok Casey	
7	White		Samuel Snowden Hayes	
8	Edwards · Wabash		William Pickering	
9	Lawrence · Richland		Ebenezer Z. Ryan	
10	Crawford · Jasper		Richard G. Morris	
11	Coles		Usher F. Linder	
12	Clark		Joshua P. Cooper	
13	Clay · Cumberland · Effingham		Elisha H. Starkweather	
14	Fayette		John McDonald	
15	Bond · Clinton · Montgomery		Edward Y. Rice	
15	Bond · Clinton · Montgomery		Richard S. Bond	
16	Perry · Washington		Zenas H. Venor	
17	Randolph		Samuel H. Guthrie	
18	Monroe		Xerxes F. Trail	
19	St.Clair		Simon Stookey †	Died in office
19	St.Clair		Samuel B. Chandler	Replaced Stookey
19	St.Clair		Edward Abend	
20	Madison		Edward Keatling	
20	Madison		Curtis Blakeman Jr.	
21	Macoupin		F. A. Olds	
22	Greene · Jersey		Isaac Darneille †	Died in office
22	Greene · Jersey		Joel Corey	Replaced Darneille
22	Greene · Jersey		John D. Fry	Resigned
22	Greene · Jersey		Thomas Carlin	Replaced Fry
23	Scott		Charles F. Keener	
24	Morgan		George B. Waller	
24	Morgan		Richard Yates Sr.	
25	Cass · Menard		Richard S. Thomas	
26	Sangamon		Ninian W. Edwards	
26	Sangamon		John W. Smith	
27	Logan · Mason		John Lucas	
28	Tazewell		Middleton Tackerberry	
29	DeWitt · McLean		James B. Price	
30	Vermillion		John J. Sconce	
31	Edgar		George W. Rives	
32	Champaign · Macon · Moultrie· Piatt		Reuben B. Ewing	
33	Christian · Shelby		Edward Evey	
34	Calhoun · Pike		Tyre Jennings	
34	Calhoun · Pike		George Pattison	
35	Adams · Brown		Onias C. Skinner	
35	Adams · Brown		Jonathan Dearborn	
35	Adams · Brown		John Marrett	
36	Schuyler		Jesse Darnell	
37	Hancock		George Walker	
37	Hancock		S. H. Taylor	
38	McDonough		Josiah Harrison	
39	Fulton		William Kellog	
39	Fulton		Edward Sayre	
40	Peoria		Edward G. Sanger	
41	Knox		Hanry J. Runkel	
42	Henderson · Mercer · Warren		Gilbert Turnbull	
42	Henderson · Mercer · Warren		Abner C. Harding	
43	Henry · Rock Island · Stark		John W. Henderson	
44	Lee · Whiteside		Joseph Crawford	
45	Carroll · Ogle		Dauphin Brown	
46	Jo Daviess · Stephenson		Abner Eads	
46	Jo Daviess · Stephenson		Cyrenius B. Denlo	
47	Winnebago		Wilson H. Crandall	
48	Marshall · Putnam · Woodford		John Page	
49	Bureau · Grundy · LaSalle · Livingston		George F. Wilson	
49	Bureau · Grundy · LaSalle · Livingston		Melancthon E. Lasher	
50	Dupage · Iroquois · Kendall · Will		William E. Little	
50	Dupage · Iroquois · Kendall · Will		Warren L. Wheaton	
50	Dupage · Iroquois · Kendall · Will		Lorenzo D. Brady	Resigned
50	Dupage · Iroquois · Kendall · Will		Orlando H. Haven	Replaced Brady
51	DeKalb · Kane		H. W. Fay	
51	DeKalb · Kane		E. W. Austin	
52	Boone · McHenry		John F. Gray	
52	Boone · McHenry		Selby Leach	
53	Lake		Lite Wilson	
54	Cook		Philip Maxwell	
54	Cook		Francis C. Sherman	

== Works cited ==
- Moses, John (1892). Illinois, historical and statistical.
- Blue Book of the State of Illinois. 1919.
- Blue Book of the State of Illinois - Illinois Legislative Roster — 1818-2024 (PDF). 2024. Archived from the original (PDF) on July 15, 2026.
- Pease, Theodore Calvin (1923). Statistical Series: Illinois Election Returns (1818-1848). Vol. 1. Illinois State Historical Library.
