= Georgia State Defense Force =

State defense force of Georgia, US

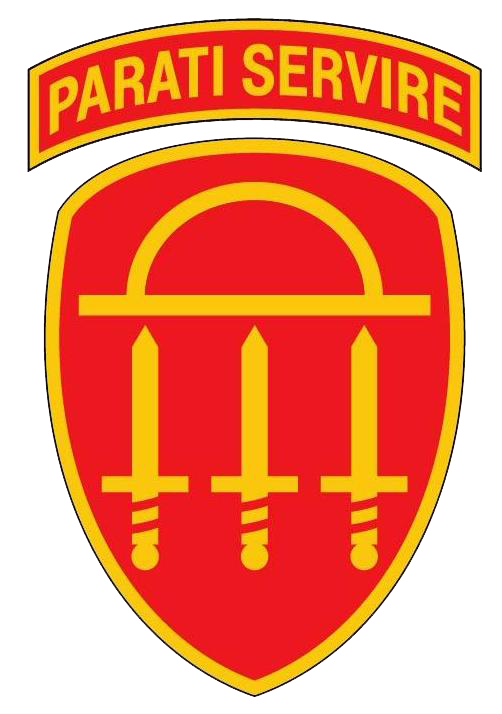
- Georgia SDF Shoulder Sleeve Insignia
- Active: Founded 1733; 293 years ago Georgia State Defense Corps (1940-1942) Georgia State Guard (1942-1951) (1973-1985) Georgia State Defense Force (1985-present)
- Country: United States
- Allegiance: Georgia
- Type: State defense force
- Role: Military reserve force
- Size: 450+ (2024)
- Part of: Georgia Department of Defense
- Garrison/HQ: Ellenwood, Georgia
- Nicknames: GSDF, GASDF
- Motto: Ready to Serve! Georgia First!
- Anniversaries: 24 August (since 1985)
- Website: gsdf.georgia.gov

Commanders
- Commander-In-Chief: Governor Brian Kemp
- Adjutant General: Major General, ARNG Richard D. Wilson
- Commander, Georgia State Defense Force: Brigadier General (GA) Dennis Watts
- Command Sergeant Major, Georgia State Defense Force: Command Sergeant Major (GA) Mike Ramos

Insignia
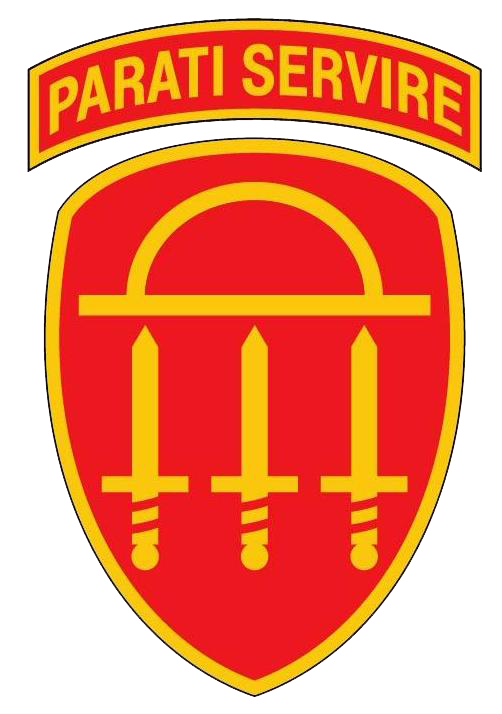
- Shoulder Sleeve Insignia

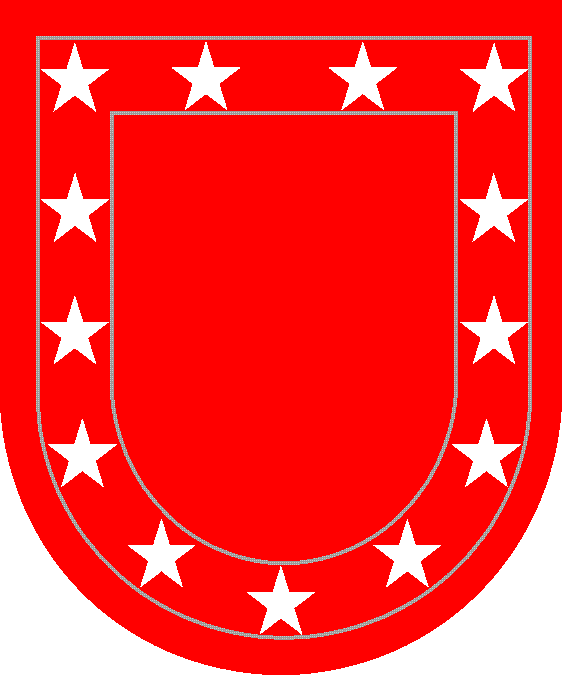
- Beret flash

- Shoulder Flag Insignia

The Georgia State Defense Force (GSDF) is Georgia's state guard. The GSDF is a professionally trained volunteer component of the Georgia Department of Defense, serving in support of the national and state constitutions under direction of the governor and the adjutant general of Georgia. As a state defense force (SDF), the GSDF serves alongside the Georgia Army National Guard and the Georgia Air National Guard. The mission of the GSDF is to provide volunteers to assist government agencies and civil relief organizations during emergencies.

GSDF Soldiers help, support, and augment the Georgia National Guard; provide professional skills to the Georgia Department of Defense; and assist Georgia communities. Soldiers are trained in search and rescue, medical support, community emergency response, and assistance in disaster relief. The GSDF also assists the Georgia National Guard with deployment training (opposing force) and small arms range support.

== Organization ==
The Georgia State Defense Force headquarters is in Ellenwood, Georgia; The organization includes two regional commands for north and south Georgia, with geographic areas of responsibility throughout the state, a support unit, Training and Doctrine Command (TRADOC), Band and Chorus, Chaplain Corps, Judge Advocate Corps, Public Affairs Office (PAO), A drone unit, an Institute for Military Support of Georgia (IMSG), and a Ready Reserve Component. The current chain of command for the State Defense Force at the state level is organized under three positions: The state commander-in-chief, the state adjutant general, and the Georgia State Defense Force commander.

=== Units ===
- GSDF Headquarters and Headquarters Company
- GSDF Band and Chorus
- GSDF Public Affairs Office (PAO)
- Training and Doctrine Command (TRADOC)
- 76th Support Brigade
  - 76th Spt BDE Headquarters and Headquarters Company
  - 1st Engineer Battalion
  - 132nd Medical Battalion
  - 911th Support Battalion
  - Honor Guard
- Georgia Force Assistance Brigade (GFAB) North
  - GFAB North Headquarters and Headquarters Company
  - Able Company
  - Baker Company
- Georgia Force Assistance Brigade (GFAB) South
  - GFAB South Headquarters and Headquarters Company
  - Alpha Company
  - Bravo Company

== Requirements ==
Current eligibility requirements for the GSDF (men and women between the ages of 18 and 64):

- A background check,
- U.S. citizenship or legal residency,
- A high school diploma or equivalent, and
- Height and weight standards that are "designed to ensure that GSDF personnel present minimum acceptable appearance when in uniform."
- Enlisted and Officers must take duty-level testing criteria to determine their physical capabilities while operating within the GSDF.

Prior military or first responder experience is not required, although approximately 40 percent of active members have prior service or first responder experience.

=== Initial Entry Training ===
Civilians and prior service members past a waiver able eligibility service gap will attend the GSDF Initial Entry Training (IET) course. The duration of the training is one weekend per month for three months where GSDF recruits will learn basic Military, Emergency Management, and GSDF-oriented modules. GSDF Recruits will graduate the course after satisfactory completion of every written, practical, and field training exercise event within GSDF tasks and standards.

=== Rank Progression ===
Upon completion of the GSDF Initial Entry Training (IET) course, graduates will be promoted to the rank of Private Second Class (PV2). GSDF Recruits with prior service credentials will be promoted to the grade of their previous military uniformed service. GSDF Recruits with official college degrees or technical certifications will be promoted to either Private First Class (PFC) or Specialist (SPC) depending on the level of educational background.

Enlisted soldiers looking to progress as Non-commissioned officers must achieve the minimum rank of Private First Class (PFC) and attend the GSDF Basic Leader Course (BLC) in order to be eligible for future promotion after completion of the course. Sergeant (SGT) rank is eligible after suitable time in service and grade are met without the requirement of BLC. BLC must be completed in order to be eligible for Staff Sergeant (SSG). Additional courses such as the Advanced Leader Course (ALC) and the Senior Leader Course (SLC) are required in order to progress further as a senior Non-commissioned officer.

To be eligible for officer or Warrant officer commission, enlistees must have a four-year Bachelor's degree (officer) or technical credentials (warrant officer) in order to attend the GSDF Basic Officer Leader Course (BOLC) and earn their commission. Further courses are available to advance as an officer in the GSDF.

== Training ==
Soldiers are offered a variety of training opportunities within the GSDF as well as organizations including but not limited to the Federal Emergency Management Agency (FEMA), Georgia Emergency Management and Homeland Security Agency (GEMA/HS), State Guard Association of the United States (SGAUS), The Georgia National Guard, and various city/county emergency services. The following training opportunities are available with the GSDF:

- Search and Rescue Specialist (SARSPEC)
- Debris Clearing and Chainsaw Operations (DCCO)
- Community Emergency Response Team (CERT)
- First Aid Specialist Course (FASC)
- Basic and Master Rappel Training
- Rappel Safety Officer (RSO)
- Basic Instructor's Course (BIC)
- Color Guard Training
- Cadre Training Course (CTC)
- Water Survival Training
- Military Emergency Management Specialist (MEMS)

== Uniform ==
The GSDF alongside many other active state defense forces will ensure that all authorized uniforms will adopt nametapes, service uniform buttons, cap devices, and other insignia that will differ significantly from that prescribed for wear by members of the United States Army. This requirement is in accordance with "AR 670-1, chapter. 2-7, paragraph k and chapter 23-8, paragraph c".

GSDF Soldiers wear the Army Combat Uniform in the Operational Camouflage Pattern (OCP) with Coyote Brown combat boots and Coyote Brown solid or mesh tactical ball cap, alongside the Tan 499 undershirt and rigger belt. The nametapes for the blouse and tactical ball cap are black stencil on Coyote Brown background. GSDF Soldiers will have their last name on the right nametape of their blouse and the back of their operator cap (as worn) while the left nametape adorns the organization "GEORGIA SDF" in distinction from the U.S. ARMY nametape that is worn normally for Active Army, Army Reserve and Army National Guard Soldiers. Only Army rank insignia will be worn on the blouse which is subdued on Coyote Brown background. Officer and Warrant Officer candidates will wear the OCS (officer) or WOCS (warrant officer) rank insignia while attending BOLC. GSDF Soldiers also wear a reversed full color Georgia State Flag patch on the right shoulder of the combat uniform, while the subdued GSDF Shoulder Sleeve Insignia (SSI) and “PARATI SERVIRE” tab are worn on the left shoulder.

GSDF Soldiers are authorized to wear certain tabs and identification badges upon completion of a GSDF TRADOC-identified school such as CERT or SARSPEC II. GSDF Soldiers can also earn other badges and tabs through completion of state approved missions or requirements outlined by SGAUS.

Authorized headgear for the GSDF is either the Coyote Brown tactical ball cap, OCP Summer Hat (boonie), Black or Coyote Beanie, Kevlar Helmet, or the Black Beret with Red Flash and accommodating Distinctive Unit Insignia (DUI) (enlisted) or unsubdued rank (officer and warrant officer). Wearing of any headgear listed is under the determination of the unit commander.

When conducting physical training activities, GSDF Soldiers are authorized to wear either their GSDF Physical Training Attire or the Army Physical Fitness Uniform (APFU) with proper athletic footwear alongside a reflective safety belt.

Cadre members assigned to training schools are authorized to wear the Black Patrol Cap with unsubdued rank insignia and yellow lettering on black background nametape with their last name. GSDF Soldiers operating as Opposing Force (OPFOR) elements in a training environment are authorized to wear the M81 Woodland Battle Dress Uniform (BDU), OG-107 colored fatigues, or other appropriate attire conducive to the operation scenario.

GSDF Soldiers are also authorized to wear the Army Service Uniform in either the Army Blue Service Uniform or the Army Green Service Uniform (Pinks and Greens).The name tag for both service uniforms will be a burgundy peeble finish background with gray lettering which will state the last name of the Soldier and under it will say "Georgia State Defense Force". Rank Insignia, Distinctive Unit Insignia, Ribbons, Identifiers, and Patches will be worn in distinction from federal U.S. Army forces. Prior service members are authorized to wear their previous ribbons, badges, and tabs that they have received from federal and/or state service. GSDF Soldiers will wear the black beret with red flash with proper insignia noted above for the Army Blue Service Uniform or the garrison cap with accommodating DUI (enlisted) or unsubdued rank (officer and warrant officer) for the Army Green Service Uniform.

== History ==
The Georgia State Defense Force's heritage dates back to England. Under the direction of General James Oglethorpe, Sergeants of the Guard trained future colonists in military tactics. As settlers began arriving in Georgia around 1733, many became members of General James Oglethorpe's command and were called upon during the Battle of Bloody Marsh in 1742 to help repel the Spanish invasion of Georgia. These forces later joined General George Washington in the fight for American Independence.

In 1779, forces in Georgia aligned with the patriots fought in the Battle of Kettle Creek where they decisively defeated the loyalist militia who were on their way to British-controlled Augusta.

In 1836, Georgia sent a battalion of men to aid the Texas' freedom fighters in their fight against Mexican forces during the Texas Revolution.

The volunteers remained in continuous service throughout the 18th and 19th centuries. During this time, they participated in Indian wars against the Creeks, Cherokees, and Choctaws, and, with the outbreak of the American Civil War, Georgia responded with over 100 volunteer regiments, battalions, and batteries. The portion that remained at home helped to defend Atlanta and Macon, shadowed by the Union advance in 1864. This volunteer commitment was second only in number to the Commonwealth of Virginia.

In 1917, following passage of the National Defense Act of 1916, the National Guard could be called into federal service. As a result, Georgia law organized into three classes: the National Guard, the naval militia, and the unorganized militia. It further created a separate Home Guard, or State Constabulary, also subject to military law. After World War I, they were called upon to put down labor unrest at factories and mills across the state. In 1940, with the onset of World War II, Governor E.D. Rivers requested the American Legion to organize the Georgia State Defense Corps. The next year, in 1941, Colonel Ryburn Clay was appointed to head the State Defense Corps and it was activated and placed under the command of Brigadier General Omar Bradley, commanding officer at Ft. Benning, Georgia. Its name was shortly changed to the State Defense Corps of Georgia and then to the Georgia State Guard in 1942. During World War II, 35,000 volunteer members guarded war plants, critical communications facilities, utilities, reservoirs, and transportation facilities. Approximately 8,000 served at any given time with about 10,000 left at the end of the war. They were trained to repel an invasion that never came. Although not officially disbanded until 1951, the Georgia State Guard began its retirement in July 1946.

The Georgia State Guard was re-authorized in 1973 to serve as a constabulary force, and throughout the 1970s and 1980s was tasked to serve as a backup for state police forces. Legislation resulted in the first muster in 1985 when it was re-activated as the Georgia State Defense Force under the command of Brigadier General John Gillette. The force was tasked to provide a cadre around a larger force to assume the vacated domestic missions of Georgia National Guard members called to federal duty.

The current Georgia State Defense Force is authorized by the federal government under 32 USC 109(c), by the State of Georgia under Title 38 of the Official Code of Georgia Annotated, and by the National Guard Bureau under NGR 10-4. The Georgia Department of Defense is composed of the Georgia Army National Guard, the Georgia Air National Guard, and the Georgia State Defense Force, all of which serve under the direction of the adjutant general of Georgia.

GSDF operations have included support to National Guard units during the Gulf War, participation in the 1996 Atlanta Olympic Games, emergency aid to agencies such as the Federal Emergency Management Agency (FEMA) and Georgia Emergency Management and Homeland Security Agency (GEMA/HS), support to Georgia National Guard units and their families since 2001, activation during the 2004 G-8 Summit at Sea Island, the 2005 Katrina and Rita hurricane evacuations, and response to Hurricanes Matthew, Irma, and Michael. In 2010, GSDF Soldiers were recognized by a special resolution of the Georgia Legislature for their participation in Operation Healing Hands, providing disaster relief to earthquake victims in Haiti. After the devastating outbreak of tornadoes across the southeast U.S. in May 2011, members of the GSDF participated in relief efforts in Lamar County and other hard-hit areas of the state. GSDF Soldiers, including consumer advocate Major Clark Howard, assisted with vehicle removal following a huge traffic jam caused by Winter Storm Leon. In October 2016, the GSDF was activated in support during the aftermath of Hurricane Matthew. The GSDF assisted in setting up and operating four evacuation centers in Macon, Georgia. The GSDF has also helped in organizing and delivering donations from the American Red Cross.

In September 2017, the GSDF was activated during the aftermath of Hurricane Maria. The GSDF assisted the United States Air Force in offloading evacuated patients from St. Croix, Virgin Islands to Dobbins Air Reserve Base in Marietta, Georgia.

In 2018, the GSDF established an Opposing Force unit tasked with providing realistic combat training to National Guard troops prior to deployment.

In 2019, the first GSDF Soldier was awarded the Georgia Governor's Twenty Tab after successful placement in the rifle category of the Andrew Sullens Marksmanship Competition. In March 2020, elements of the Georgia State Defense Force were activated to assist in Georgia's response to the COVID-19 pandemic. The GSDF provided COVID-19 support to the state of Georgia from March 16, 2020 through July 17, 2020. This was the longest continuous call-up in the GSDF's history. The Georgia Department of Defense presented a Georgia Distinguished Unit Ribbon to the GSDF for its service during the COVID-19 pandemic.

In 2023, the first GSDF Soldier was awarded the Georgia Governor's Twenty Tab after simultaneous placement of both rifle and pistol categories while competing in the Andrew Sullens Marksmanship Competition.

In November 2023, GSDF Soldiers were activated to provide traffic support and visitor assistance during the funeral service of former First Lady Rosalynn Carter in Plains, Georgia.

In September and October 2024, the Georgia State Defense Force was activated to provide debris clearing support, as well as food and water distribution in parts of south Georgia during the aftermath of Hurricane Helene. The GSDF assisted both the Georgia Army and Air National Guard units with providing qualified manpower and equipment to clear roads for emergency assistance.

In January 2025, The GSDF alongside the United States Secret Service, Georgia National Guard, GEMA/HS, Georgia State Patrol, and various other state municipalities were activated in a joint operation to facilitate funeral service of former President and Governor of Georgia Jimmy Carter. The GSDF operated a mobile Tactical Operations Center (TOC) in coordination with unified command to facilitate parking, traffic control, and assistance to visitors attending the service. In March 2025, The GSDF entered team of enlisted and non-commissioned officers into the Georgia National Guard Best Warrior Competition. The team competed against members from both the Georgia Army National Guard and the Georgian Defense Forces from the country of Georgia. One GSDF Soldier received the Chad Mercer Award for "exemplifying the warrior spirit and showing resilience against all odds".

In March 2025, The GSDF alongside the Georgia Air National Guard, Georgia Army National Guard, and several federal/state agencies participated in Patriot 25, an exercise sponsored by the National Guard to train personnel on domestic disaster response and interagency coordination. The GSDF trained in search and rescue operations, medical evacuations, and recovery assessments at the Guardian Centers in Perry, Georgia.

In December 2025, The GSDF alongside various federal, state, and civil services participated in Vigilant Guard 26-1 to expand training capabilities and improve National Homeland Defense Readiness. The GSDF responded through rehearsing complex multi-domain attacks within simulated training environments to suit agency interoperability. The GSDF utilized unmanned aerial drone craft to locate simulated routes as well as clearing debris and obstacles through chainsaw operations in Anniston, Alabama.

In March 2026, The GSDF entered a team of enlisted and non-commissioned officers into the Georgia National Guard Best Warrior Competition. The team competed against members from both the Georgia Army National Guard and the Georgian Defense Forces from the country of Georgia. One GSDF Non-Commissioned Officer received the Chad Mercer Award.

== Legal protection ==
Employers in the state of Georgia are required by law to grant a leave of absence to any employees who serve in the GSDF and who are activated for any military service, and to restore those employees to their previous positions upon their return from their deployment. GSDF Soldiers who are employed by a government organization are also entitled to 18 days of paid leave per fiscal year.

== Awards and decorations ==
Current Awards for Georgia Department of Defense (2022)

In 2022, the Georgia Department of Defense consolidated all the awards of the Georgia Army National Guard, the Georgia Air National Guard, and the Georgia State Defense Force. Prior to the consolidation, the Georgia State Defense Force issued several awards, some of which are still awarded under the Georgia Department of Defense regulation:

GSDF Soldiers who have previously served in a federal component of the United States military may also wear awards issued by any branch of the Armed Forces of the United States, a United States ally, or other recognized state defense forces in addition to any state awards. Veterans of the American military who have earned the Combat Infantry Badge, the Combat Action Badge, the Combat Medical Badge, the Parachutist Badge, the Air Assault Badge, the Special Forces tab, Ranger tab, the Sapper tab, the Aviator Badge, the Air Crewman Wings, the Submarine Warfare insignia, the Diver insignia, and the unit formation patch in cases where the soldier served in a combat zone, may wear these awards on both the dress and service uniforms as well. GSDF Soldiers are also eligible to earn the SGAUS Military Emergency Management Specialist Badge as well as various other GSDF-oriented badges and tab identifiers.

== Commanding Personnel ==
Commanding Generals

1. Col. Ryburn G. Clay | 1940-1941 (State Defense Corps)
2. Col. Lindley W. Camp | 1941-1943 (Georgia State Defense Corps)
3. Col. Hoyt Wimpy | 1943-1947 (Georgia State Guard)
4. Brig. Gen. John Gillette | 1985-1994 (Georgia State Defense Force - Onward)
5. Brig. Gen. Joel W. Seymour | 1994-2005
6. Brig. Gen. Michael Edward McGuinn III | 2005-2008
7. Brig. Gen. Jerry J. Bradford | 2008-2013
8. Brig. Gen. Thomas Danielson | 2013-2018
9. Brig. Gen. Thomas H. Blackstock JR | 2018-2020
10. Brig. Gen. Mark D. Gelhardt SR | 2020-2023
11. Brig. Gen. Dennis Watts | 2023–Present

Command Senior Enlisted Advisors

1. Command Sgt. Maj. Frank Benson 1985-1993
2. Command Sgt. Maj. Peter Bardoul | 1997-2006
3. Command Sgt. Maj. George "Randy" Garrett | 2006-2013
4. Command Sgt. Maj. Patrick O'Leary | 2013-2022
5. Command Sgt. Maj. Robert Bayne | 2022-2025
6. Command Sgt. Maj. Miguel "Mike" Ramos | 2025–Present

== Notable personnel ==
- Maj. (RETIRED) Clark B. Howard - Talk Radio Host, Consumer Advocate, and Author | 2002-2023

== See also ==
- Georgia Naval Militia
- Georgia Wing Civil Air Patrol
- National Guard Bureau
- United States Coast Guard Auxiliary
