= John Emmett =

American politician

Member of the Illinois House of Representatives
- In office 1822–1824

John Emmett was an American politician who served as a member of the Illinois House of Representatives.

Emmett served as one of three state representatives representing White County in the 3rd Illinois General Assembly serving alongside George R. Logan and Alexander Phillips.

His surnamed is also rendered as Emmit or Emmet.
