= Charles Matheny =

Charles Matheny may refer to:

- Buster Matheney (1956–2000), American basketball player
- Charles R. Matheny, American politician, member of the Illinois House of Representatives
