= Abraham Cairns =

American politician

- Preceded by: Joseph Kitchell

Member of the Illinois House of Representatives
- In office 1820–1824

Abraham Cairns was an American politician who served as a member of the Illinois House of Representatives.

He served as a state representative representing Crawford County in the 2nd Illinois General Assembly and Lawrence County in the 3rd Illinois General Assembly.
