= Abend =

Abend is a German-language surname, meaning "evening". Notable people with the surname include:

- Edward Abend, (1822–1904), German American politician
- Guy Abend (born 1990), Israeli footballer
- Harry Abend (1937–2021), Venezuelan artist

== See also ==
- Am Abend, 1910 German silent film
- Stewart v. Abend, United States Supreme Court case
