= John McFerron =

American politician

Member of the Illinois House of Representatives
- In office 1822–1824

Member of the Illinois Senate
- In office 1818 – July 1, 1819
- Preceded by: inaugural
- Succeeded by: Samuel Crozier

John McFerron was an American politician who served as a member of the Illinois Senate and the Illinois House of Representatives. He served as a state senator representing Randolph County in the 1st Illinois General Assembly. He resigned as senator on July 1, 1819. He later served as a state representative for Randolph County in the 3rd Illinois General Assembly.

== See also ==
- Politics of the United States
