= Joseph Trotier =

American politician

Member of the Illinois House of Representatives
- In office 1822–1824

Joseph Trotier was an American politician who served as a member of the Illinois House of Representatives.

Trotier served as one of three state representatives representing St. Clair County in the 3rd Illinois General Assembly serving alongside Jacob Ogle and Risdon Moore.

His surnamed is also rendered as Trottier.
