= Clark Howard =

Radio host, consumer advocate, author (born 1955)

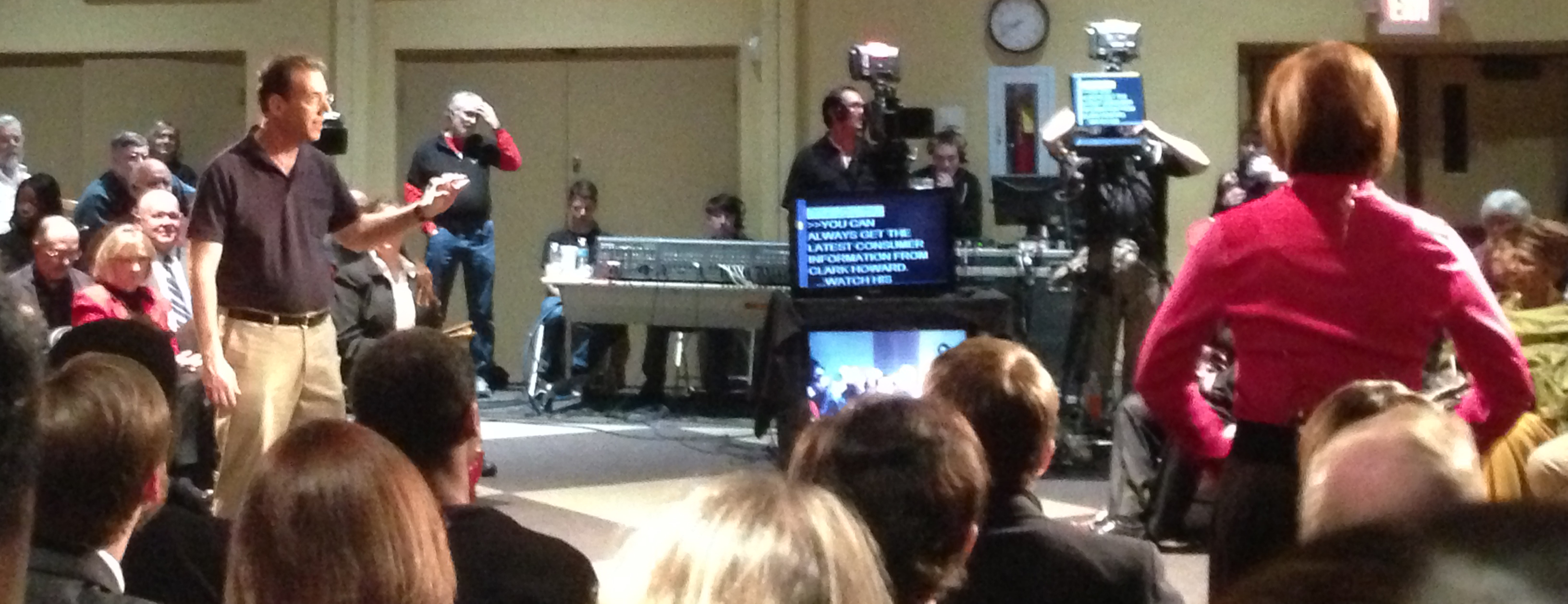
- Clark Howard (standing, left)
- Born: Clark Brian Howard; June 20, 1955 (age 71); Atlanta, Georgia, U.S.
- Education: American University; Central Michigan University
- Occupations: Syndicated talk radio host, consumer advocate, and author
- Height: 1.8 m (5 ft 11 in)
- Spouse: Lane Carlock Howard
- Military service
- Allegiance: Georgia
- Branch: Georgia State Defense Force
- Rank: Major (GA)
- Website: clark.com

Clark Brian Howard (born June 20, 1955) is an American author and radio/podcast host, focused primarily on personal finance, consumer protection, and related topics. He has hosted The Clark Howard Show, which began in 1989 and has lasted over 30 years as of 2021.

== Life and career ==
Clark Howard grew up in Atlanta, Georgia. His parents, Bernard and Joy Garson Howard, were prominent members of Atlanta's Jewish community. Howard has three children, born in 1988, 1999, and 2005.

Howard's first career was in the travel agency business. Howard attended The Westminster Schools in Atlanta before graduating from the American University in 1976 with a Bachelor of Arts in urban government. He went on to receive his Master of Business Administration degree from Central Michigan University in 1977. During the Carter administration, Clark established his travel agency, which grew into a successful enterprise with multiple branches. Eventually, the business attracted the attention of a major financial firm, which expressed interest in acquiring it. In 1987, he retired to Florida for several years after the travel agency was purchased, before returning to his home state of Georgia.

During his travels between Georgia and Florida, he was approached by a radio station to give travel advice to listeners. Not long afterward, he began giving travel advice in guest appearances on Atlanta radio. In 1991, Howard also became a consumer affairs TV reporter for WSB-TV. In 1993, he founded the Consumer Action Center to have volunteers answer consumer questions off the air. Howard's website followed in 1997, and in 1998 his radio show went into syndication. Howard's program advises listeners to "save more, spend less, and avoid getting ripped off." The Clark Howard Show was heard every day on more than 200 radio stations throughout North America, and aired from News/Talk WSB, WSB AM/WSBB FM in Atlanta. He is a frequent consumer expert guest on other talk, variety, and news programs.

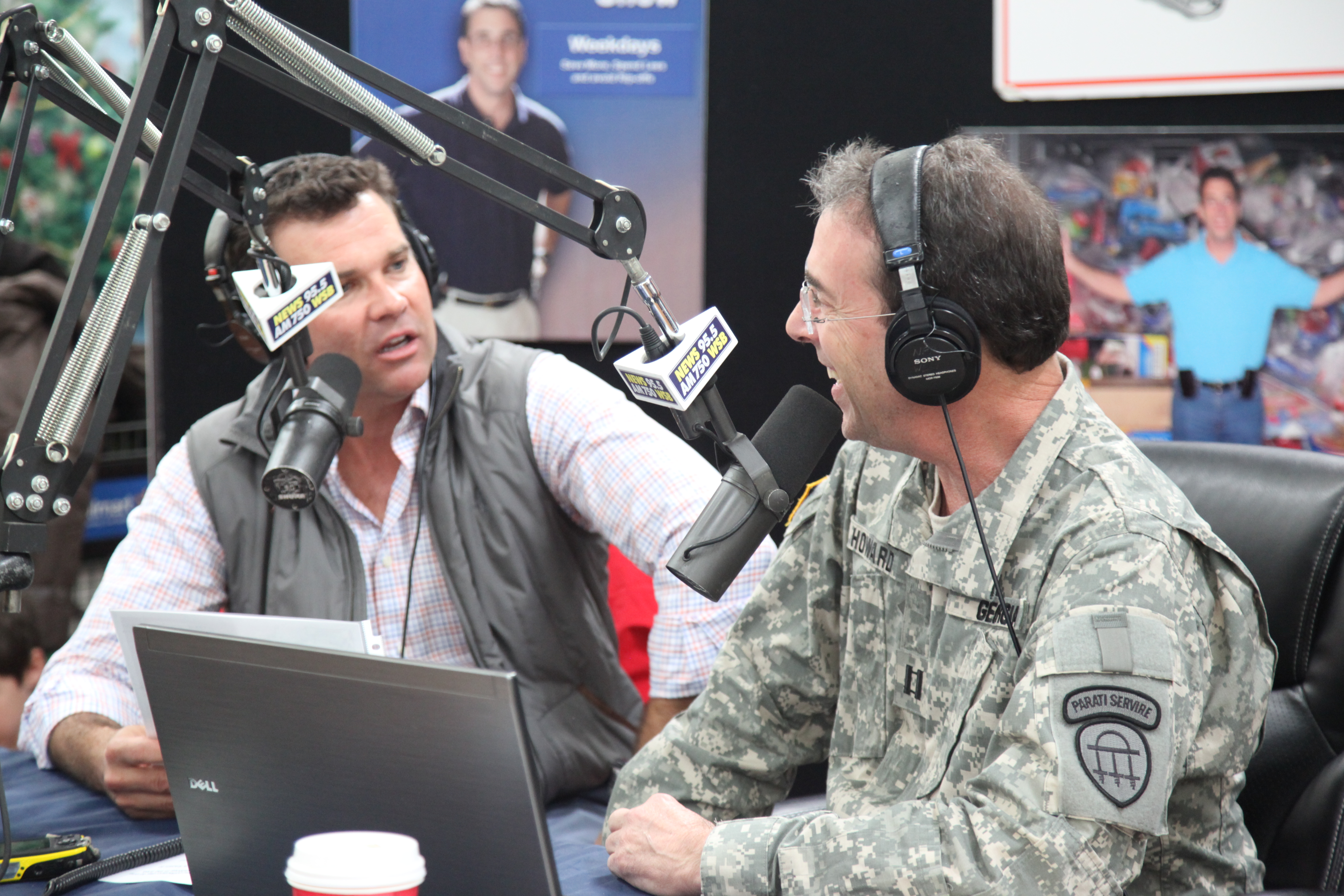
Clark Howard taking the airwaves with WSB-TV news anchor Justin Farmer to raise awareness and donations for the 24th annual "Clark's Christmas Kids" campaign in 2014.

Howard explained on air that he was joining the Georgia State Defense Force (an unarmed, non-federal branch of the Georgia Department of Defense) following the September 11 attacks. He attended monthly training workshops around the state as part of his service, and performed medical evacuation work in New Orleans following Hurricane Katrina.

In 2009, Howard announced he was diagnosed with prostate cancer. He gave a public announcement on WSB-TV on February 18, 2009. He gave another update three months later on his website.

In August 2017, Howard described how he escaped a car backing towards him at a parking lot, by jumping into the air.

His daily two-hour radio show was syndicated by Westwood One until the end of 2020. That year Howard retired the daily radio show, but maintained a shorter daily podcast and made regular appearances on WSB.

=== Other appearances ===
From 2012 to 2013, Howard was a co-host of HLN's Evening Express, a daily news and lifestyle roundup that aired weeknights.

Several years earlier, in 2009, Howard hosted a weekend program on HLN. The format was similar to Howard's radio show, in that the host gives advice to callers and provides tips on saving money. In 2012, he became one of several anchors on the daily HLN show "Evening Express," which aired from 5 to 7:00pm ET. Howard has also appeared elsewhere on HLN such as on Morning Express with Robin Meade.

Howard continues to regularly appear on WSB-TV in Atlanta, which is occasionally broadcast by other Cox Television stations nationwide. His TV appearances offer consumer scam warnings and consumer tips.

He started several civic programs in the community, such as Atlanta Volunteer Action, Volunteer Action, Inc., The Big Buddy Program, and Career Action.

With help from his listeners, Howard began teaming up with Habitat for Humanity in 1996 to build houses around the Atlanta area. The year 2010 marked the 15th-anniversary build and "Team Clark" completed its 39th house together. In 2013, he built his 50th home for Atlanta Habitat for Humanity. In 2018, Team Clark completed its 75th Habitat home.

In 2001, Howard created the WSB Radio Care-A-Thon which raises funds each July for the AFLAC Cancer and Blood Disorders Center at Children's Healthcare of Atlanta.

=== Author ===
Howard is the author of several books on consumer tips and bargains. His most recent book: "Clark Howard's Living Large for the Long Haul: Consumer-Tested Ways to Overhaul Your Finances, Increase Your Savings, and Get Your Life Back on Track" contains tips to help navigate the economics of life in the US. Other books include his 2011 title Living Large in Lean Times. This book features 250+ ways to "save more, spend less, and avoid rip-offs." Other books include Clark Smart Real Estate (2006), Clark Smart Parents, Clark Smart Kids (2005), Clark's Big Book of Bargains (2003) and Get Clark Smart: The Ultimate Guide to Getting Rich From America's Money-Saving Expert (2002). Howard's Get Clark Smart made it to No. 6 on The New York Times "Best Seller" list for "How-To Books." And his Big Book of Bargains made it to No. 7 and No. 11 on The New York Times "Best Seller" list for "Business Books".

== Honors ==
In 2011, a Golden Palm Star on the Palm Springs, California, Walk of Stars was dedicated to him. In 2015, Howard was voted into the National Radio Hall of Fame, to be inducted November 5. In 2016 he was a recipient of the "Good and Faithful Servant Award" from the Peachtree Christian Hospice.

== Books ==
- Clark Howard's Consumer Survival Kit III (Paperback ed.). Longstreet Pr. 1999. ISBN 1-56352-506-2.
- Get Clark Smart : The Ultimate Guide for the Savvy Consumer (Paperback ed.). Longstreet Pr. 2000. ISBN 1-56352-629-8.
- Get Clark Smart: The Ultimate Guide to Getting Rich from America's Money-Saving Expert (Paperback ed.). Longstreet. 2002. ISBN 078688777X.
- Clark's Big Book of Bargains : Clark Howard Teaches You How to Get the Best Deals (Paperback ed.). Longstreet. 2003. ISBN 0-7868-8778-8.
- Clark Smart Parents, Clark Smart Kids : Teaching Kids of Every Age the Value of Money (Paperback ed.). Longstreet. 2005. ISBN 0-7868-8779-6.
- Clark Smart Real Estate: The Ultimate Guide to Buying and Selling Real Estate (Paperback ed.). Longstreet. 2006. ISBN 140130785X.
- Living Large in Lean Times (Paperback ed.). Penguin Group. 2011. ISBN 978-1-58333-433-1.
- Each book was written with coauthor Mark Meltzer.
