= Curtis Blakeman Jr. =

American politician

Member of the Illinois House of Representatives
- In office 1846–1850

Member of the Illinois House of Representatives
- In office 1842–1844

Curtis Blakeman Jr. was an American politician who served as a member of the Illinois House of Representatives.

Blakeman served as one of three state representatives representing Madison County in the 13th Illinois General Assembly and the 15th Illinois General Assembly. He was elected as one of two state representatives representing the 20th district (Madison County) in the 1848 election to the 16th Illinois General Assembly the other being Edward Keatling.

His father, Curtis Blakeman, also served in the Illinois State House (1822–1826).
