= Georgia Wing Civil Air Patrol =

Highest echelon of the Civil Air Patrol in Georgia, United States

- Georgia Wing of Civil Air Patrol

Associated branches
- United States Air Force

Command staff
- Commander: Col Adam Davidson
- Senior Enlisted Leader: CMSgt Fred Broome
- Deputy Commander: North GA - Lt Col Shannon Brumfield; South GA - Lt Col Joel Seidband
- Chief of Staff: Maj Liza Montalvo

Current statistics
- Cadets: 931
- Seniors: 882
- Total Membership: 1813
- Awards: Unit Citation Award (2016); Unit Citation Award (as part of Southeast Region) (2019)
- Website: gawg.cap.gov
- Statistics as of 3 January 2024

The Georgia Wing (GAWG) is a subdivision of the Civil Air Patrol which oversees its operations in Georgia. They provide emergency services, aerospace education, and cadet programs within the state. Georgia Wing headquarters are located at Dobbins Air Reserve Base in Marietta, Georgia. Georgia Wing is often referred to by its members as "GA-Wing".

== Mission ==
CAP focuses itself on accomplishing its three main missions: to provide emergency services during critical times; offer cadet programs that help young people develop important life skills and leadership abilities; and give aerospace education to its members and the general public.

=== Emergency services ===
CAP provides emergency services including search and rescue, disaster relief support and assistance in humanitarian aid missions. The CAP provides Air Force support through providing light transport, communications support, and low-altitude route surveys. CAP may also assist in counter-drug missions, if required.

=== Cadet programs ===
CAP offers a cadet program for youth ages 12 to 21. The program is organized as a sixteen-step training program which offers aerospace education, leadership training, physical fitness, and moral leadership.

=== Aerospace education ===
CAP provides aerospace education for both CAP members and the general public. It includes providing training to the members of the CAP, and offering workshops for youth across the nation via schools and public aviation events.

== Structure ==
Georgia Wing is the highest level of Civil Air Patrol in Georgia. the Georgia Wing reports to Southeast Region CAP, who reports to CAP National Headquarters.

Below the wing level, Georgia is divided into groups. Each group conducts its own training and programs, as well as participates in larger-scale training and events with the rest of Georgia Wing, Southeast Region, and National CAP organizations (e.g. professional development classes, emergency services training classes and exercises, cadet flight orientation events, and cadet and senior aerospace and leadership training events).

Underneath each group are numerous squadrons. Squadrons are the local level of organization, and squadrons typically meet weekly to conduct training. There are three types of Civil Air Patrol squadrons. A cadet squadron focuses primarily on providing training and education (leadership, character development, aerospace education, and emergency services training) for cadets. A senior squadron is a unit dedicated to allowing senior members to focus on CAP's missions. Composite squadrons have both cadets and senior members working together.

=== Groups and squadrons ===
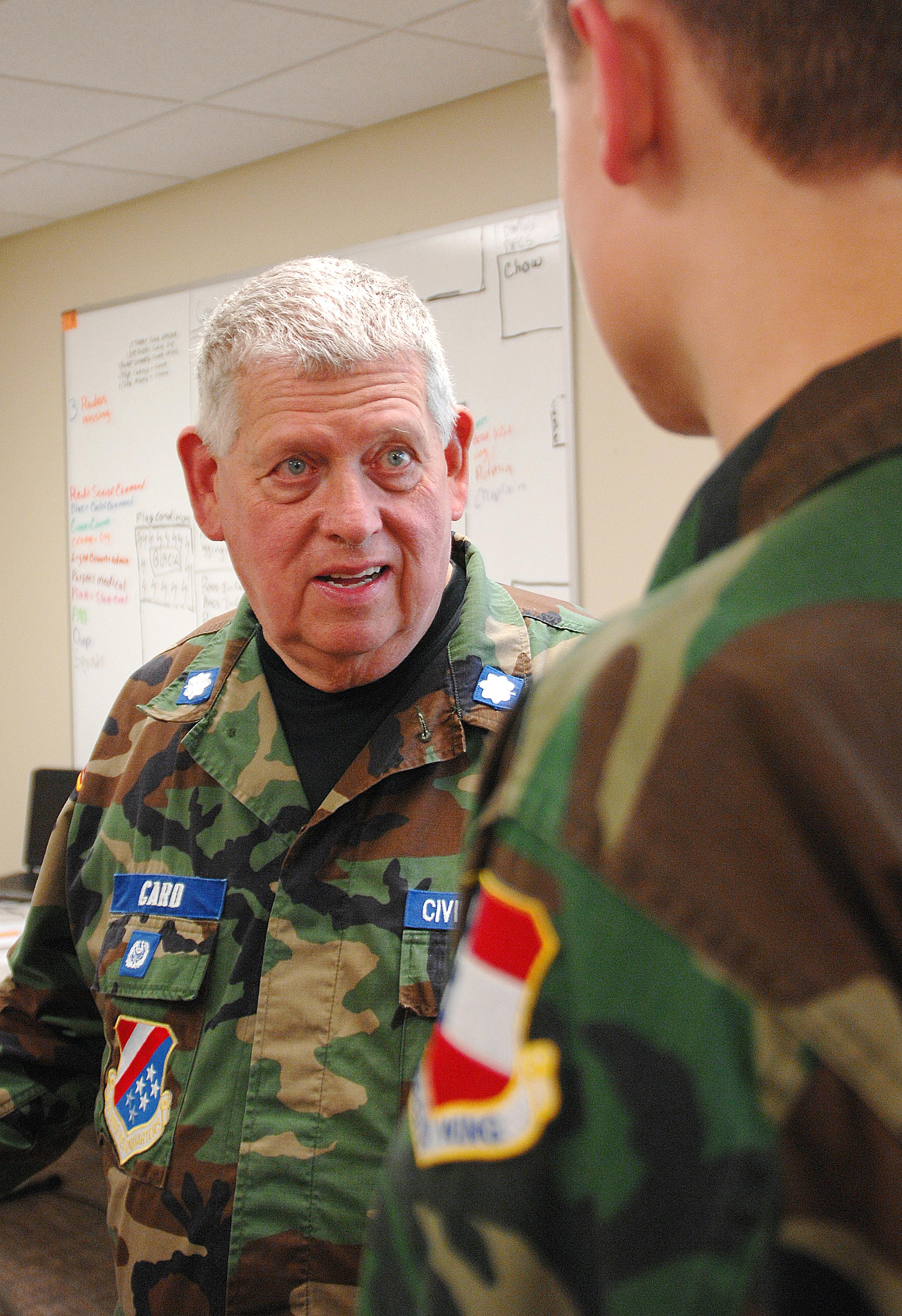
Lt. Col. James Card, (center), assistant director of communications and licensing officer, Georgia Wing Civil Air Patrol, discusses the CAP's three missions with a young cadet.

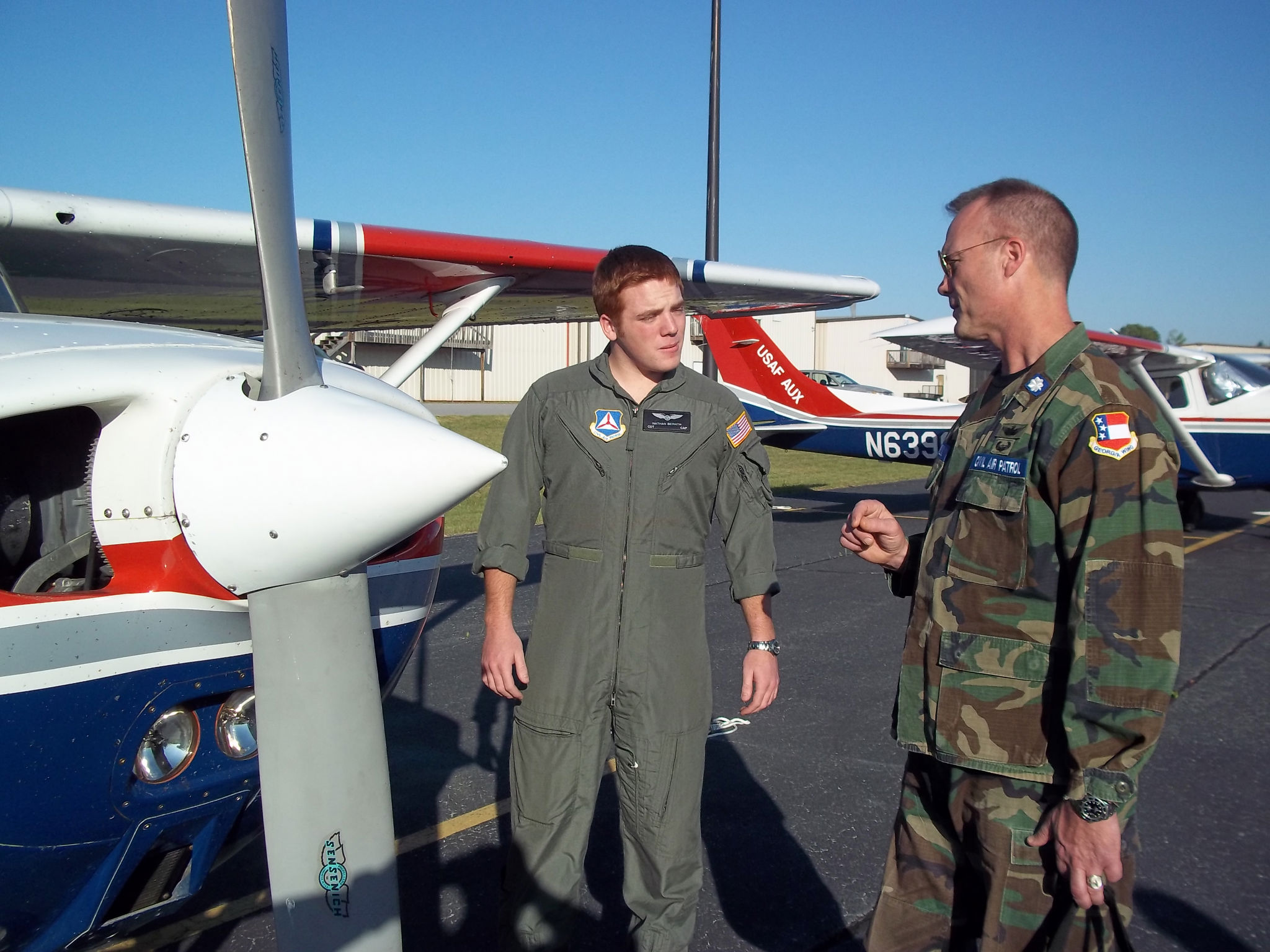
Cap. Cadet 2d Lt. Nathan Bernth (left) speaks with Col. Brent Bracewell (right).

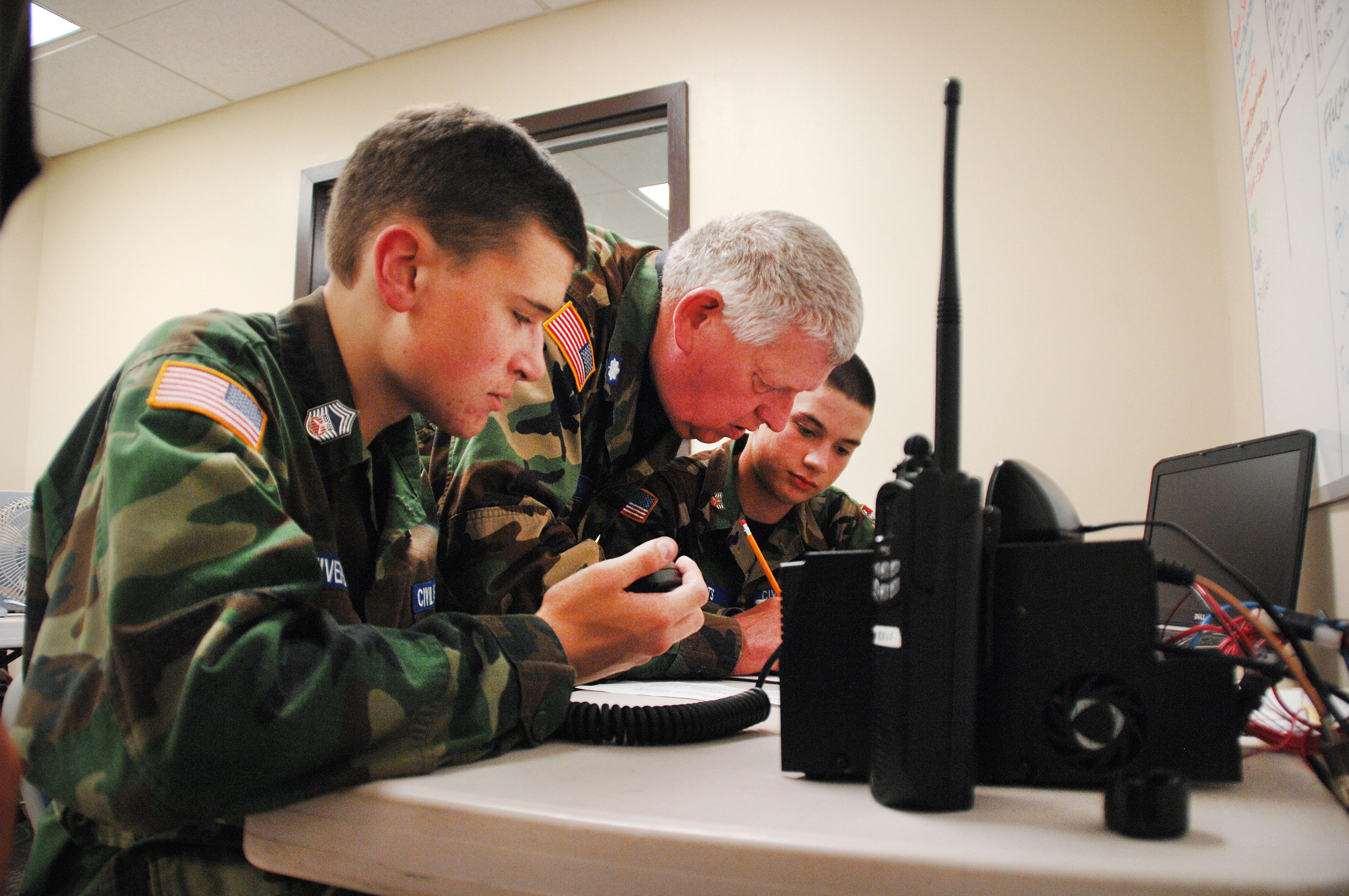
Lt. Col. James Card, (center), Georgia Wing Civil Air Patrol, teaches young cadets how to use communication equipment during Georgia Wing CAP’s weeklong summer encampment at Marine Corps Logistics Base Albany.

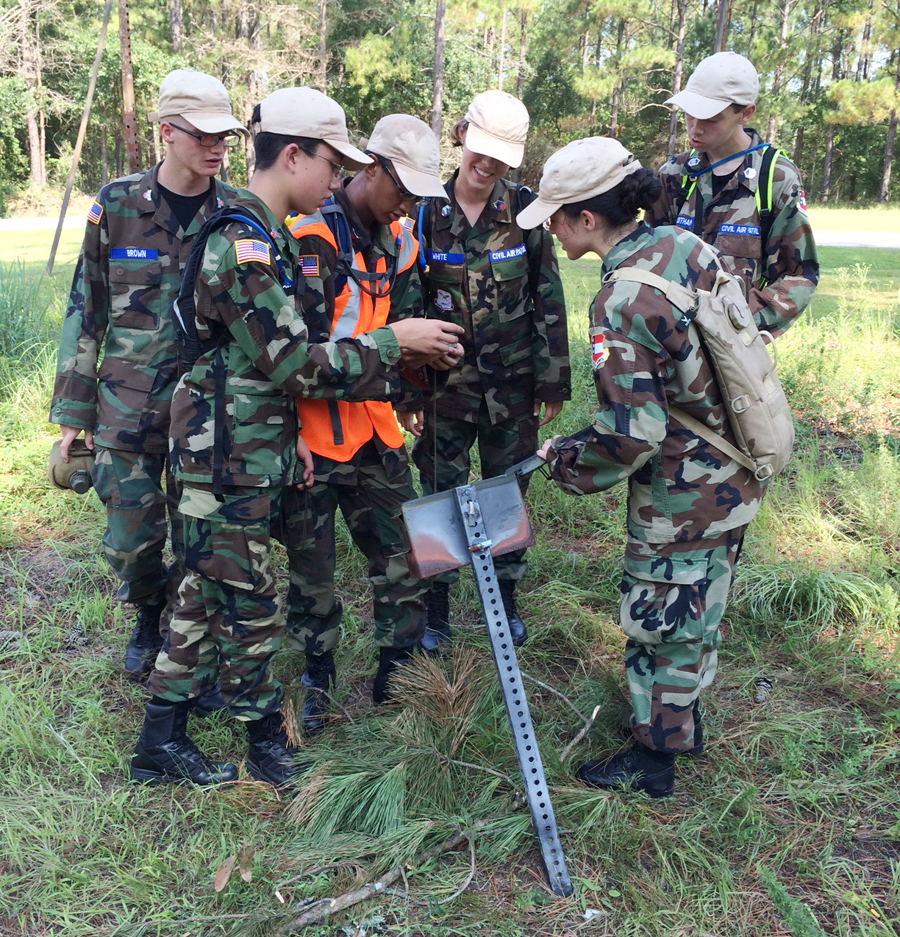
Georgia Wing Civil Air Patrol cadets collaborate before setting out for their next objective during land navigation training.

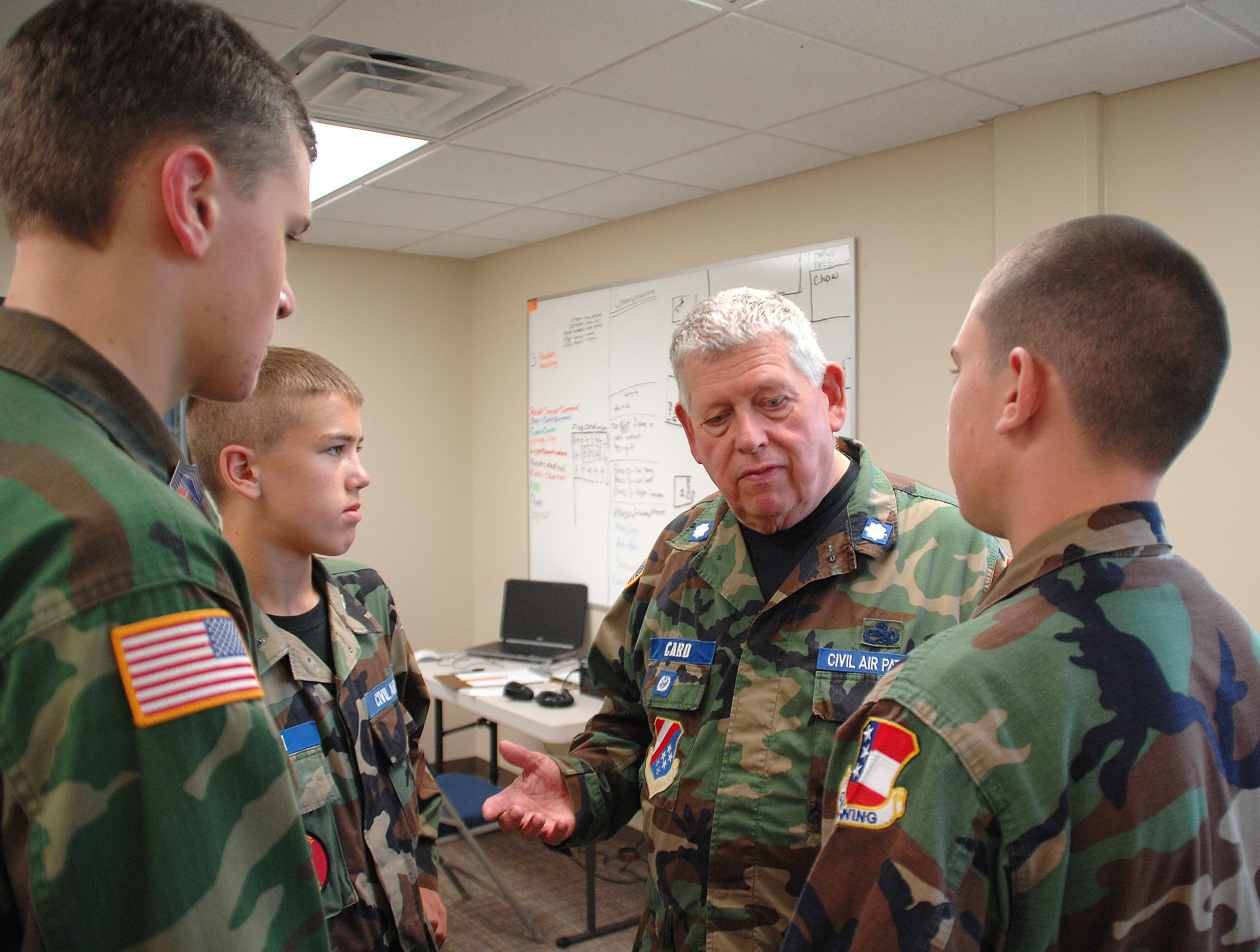
Lt. Col. James Card, Georgia Wing Civil Air Patrol, mentors with young cadets.

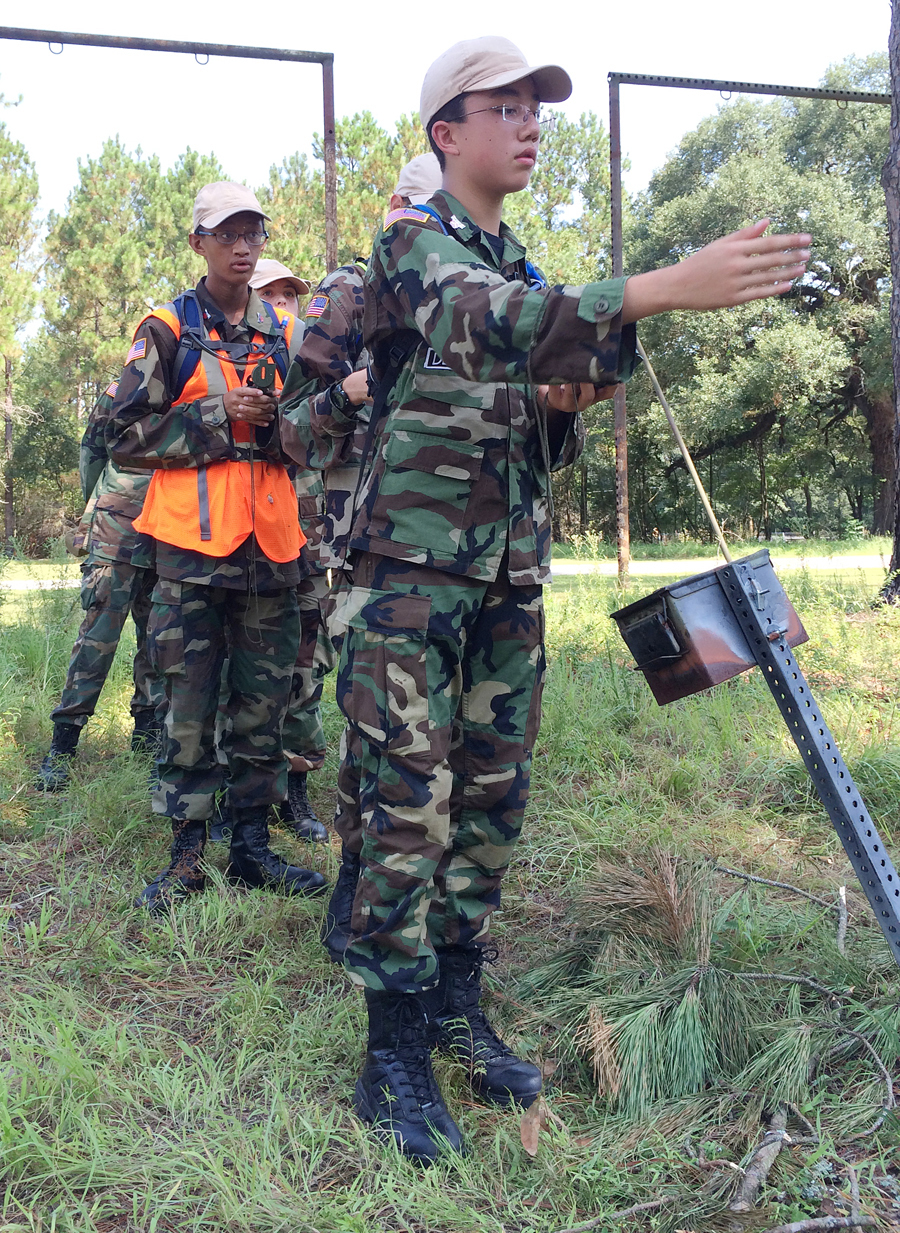
Cadet Airmen First Class Blake Jones, Echo Flight, Squadron 2, Georgia Wing Civil Air Patrol, points his team in the direction to find their next objective during land navigation training, July 22.

==== Group 1 ====
Group I is responsible for operations in and around Northwest Metro Atlanta.

Squadrons of group 1
Squadron number	Name/location	Type
SER-GA-003	Atlanta Senior Squadron #1	Senior
SER-GA-045	Sandy Springs Cadet Squadron	Cadet
SER-GA-090	Cobb County Composite Squadron	Composite
SER-GA-118	Group 1 headquarters	Headquarters
SER-GA-129	Bartow-Etowah Composite Squadron	Composite
SER-GA-454	Marietta Air Museum Cadet Squadron	Cadet

==== Group 2 ====
Group 2 operates around Northeastern Metro Atlanta.

Squadrons of group 2
Squadron number	Name/location	Type
SER-GA-065	DeKalb County Cadet Squadron	Cadet
SER-GA-112	Gwinnett Composite Squadron	Composite
SER-GA-119	Group 2 headquarters	Headquarters
SER-GA-130	PDK Senior Squadron	Senior
SER-GA-142	Walton County Composite Squadron	Composite
SER-GA-156	Barrow Jackson Composite Squadron	Composite
SER-GA-157	Newton County Cadet Squadron	Cadet
SER-GA-452	Clarke County Composite Squadron	Composite
SER-GA-815	Rockdale County Cadet Squadron Conyers Middle School	Cadet

==== Group 3 ====
Group 3 operates in the Central Georgia area.

Squadrons of group 3
Squadron number	Name/location	Type
SER-GA-002	Albany Composite Squadron	Composite
SER-GA-014	Griffin Composite Squadron	Composite
SER-GA-033	Middle Georgia Senior Squadron	Senior
SER-GA-121	Group 3 headquarters	Headquarters
SER-GA-419	South Georgia Cadet Squadron	Cadet

==== Group 4 ====
Group 4 conducts operations in the East Georgia area.

Squadrons of group 4
Squadron number	Name/location	Type
SER-GA-069	Augusta Composite Squadron	Composite
SER-GA-072	Brunswick Senior Squadron	Senior
SER-GA-075	Savannah Composite Squadron	Composite
SER-GA-122	Group 4 headquarters	Headquarters
SER-GA-451	Statesboro Composite Squadron	Composite
SER-GA-454	Effingham Cadet Squadron	Cadet

==== Group 5 ====
Group 5 conducts operations in the Northern Georgia area.

Squadrons of group 5
Squadron number	Name/location	Type
SER-GA-108	Whitfield-Murray Cadet Squadron	Cadet
SER-GA-123	Group 5 headquarters	Headquarters
SER-GA-152	North Georgia Composite Squadron	Composite
SER-GA-160	Forsyth County Cadet Squadron	Cadet
SER-GA-447	Dahlonega Senior Squadron	Senior
SER-GA-506	Currahee Composite Squadron	Composite
SER-GA-507	Ellijay Composite Squadron	Composite

==== Group 6 ====
Group 6 conducts operations in the Western Georgia area.

Squadrons of group 6
Squadron number	Name/location	Type
SER-GA-098	Columbus Composite Squadron	Composite
SER-GA-109	Fulton Composite Squadron	Composite
SER-GA-116	Peachtree City-Falcon Field Composite Squadron	Composite
SER-GA-124	Group 6 headquarters	Headquarters
SER-GA-153	West Georgia Composite Squadron	Composite
SER-GA-154	Sweetwater Cadet Squadron	Composite

== Schools ==
Georgia Wing conducts a number of schools to support its three main missions (emergency services, aerospace education, and cadet programs). These schools provide instruction and hands on experience to members in a variety of areas, ranging from aviation to search and rescue.

=== Cadet activities ===
Encampment

This school is normally a week-long in-residence training program for cadets age 12-20, supervised by trained adult Cadet Programs Officers with USAF oversight. The encampment teaches basic cadets the fundamentals of followership and discipline in a fun environment that is both academic and applied, with hands on events. This course is typically held on a local military base (see CAPP 60-70 for more detail) and typical activities may include supervised rappelling, orientation flights in military aircraft, tours of base units and facilities, etc. Encampment is not basic training; per CAPP 60-70, prospective encampment attendees must first complete promotion requirements for their first stripe (Curry Award) at their home unit, inclusive of passing physical fitness run/push-up/sit up/sit and reach standards, their first Leadership test, must have memorized the cadet oath, and must pass inspection for wear and grooming standards in both the USAF Blues and BDU uniform combinations. Encampment is intended to provide cadets with a taste of military life (typically with military style accommodations, food, and formations) intended to foster leadership growth and personal development in a positive, military style advanced training environment. Encampment completion is required for promotion to cadet officer and is also the required gateway activity to qualify cadets to then attend national special activities

Region Cadet Leadership School

RCLS is also a typically week-long course, offered for cadets in the grade of C/CMSGT and above per CAPR 52-16 (Section 8-7). RCLS is similar to Air Force ROTC's field training program, focusing on developing advanced cadets' leadership potential as indirect (officer role) leaders as opposed to direct (enlisted/NCO) leaders. This course involves both classroom instruction and applied leadership skills. and may be held within Georgia Wing or within a neighboring Wing of the Southeast Region.

Glider Flight Encampment

Glider Flight Encampments are held throughout the nation, and instruct cadets in the principles of flight, culminating in several rides with qualified instructors in an unpowered glider.

Powered Flight Encampment

Powered Flight Encampments instruct cadets in the basics of aviation. Cadets learn about ground and air procedures, as well as fly in CAP owned Cessna 172s and 182s. Cadets that do well during the program may earn their solo wings.

=== Adult education opportunities ===
Volunteer University

In 2020, all of the CAP adult education and senior program level-courses were reorganized under the Volunteer University. References to Squadron Leadership School (SLS), Corporate Leadership Course (CLC), Region Staff College (RSC) or National Staff College (NSC) are obsolete and have been replaced.

== See also ==
- Georgia Air National Guard
- Georgia State Defense Force
