= Samuel Alexander (Illinois politician) =

American politician

Member of the Illinois Senate
- In office 1826–1832

Member of the Illinois House of Representatives
- In office 1822–1824
- Preceded by: Samuel O'Melveny

Member of the Illinois House of Representatives
- In office 1820–1821
- Succeeded by: Samuel O'Melveny

Samuel Alexander was an American politician who served as a member of the Illinois Senate and the Illinois House of Representatives.

He served as a state representative for Pope County in the 2nd Illinois General Assembly and the 3rd Illinois General Assembly. He was ousted from his seat in the House during the 2nd Assembly and replaced by Samuel O'Melveny of Union County. He was re-elected to the House in 1822. He later served as a state senator representing Pope County in the 5th Illinois General Assembly, 6th Illinois General Assembly and 7th Illinois General Assembly.
