= William Boon (politician) =

American politician

Member of the Illinois Senate
- In office 1820–1824

William Boon was an American politician who served as a member of the Illinois Senate. He served as a state senator representing Jackson County in the 2nd and 3rd Illinois General Assemblies.
