= John McIntosh (Illinois politician) =

American politician

Member of the Illinois House of Representatives
- In office 1822–1824

John McIntosh was an American politician who served as a member of the Illinois House of Representatives.

McIntosh served as one of two state representatives representing Union County in the 3rd Illinois General Assembly serving alongside Alexander Pope Field.
