= Best Warrior =

American soldier competition

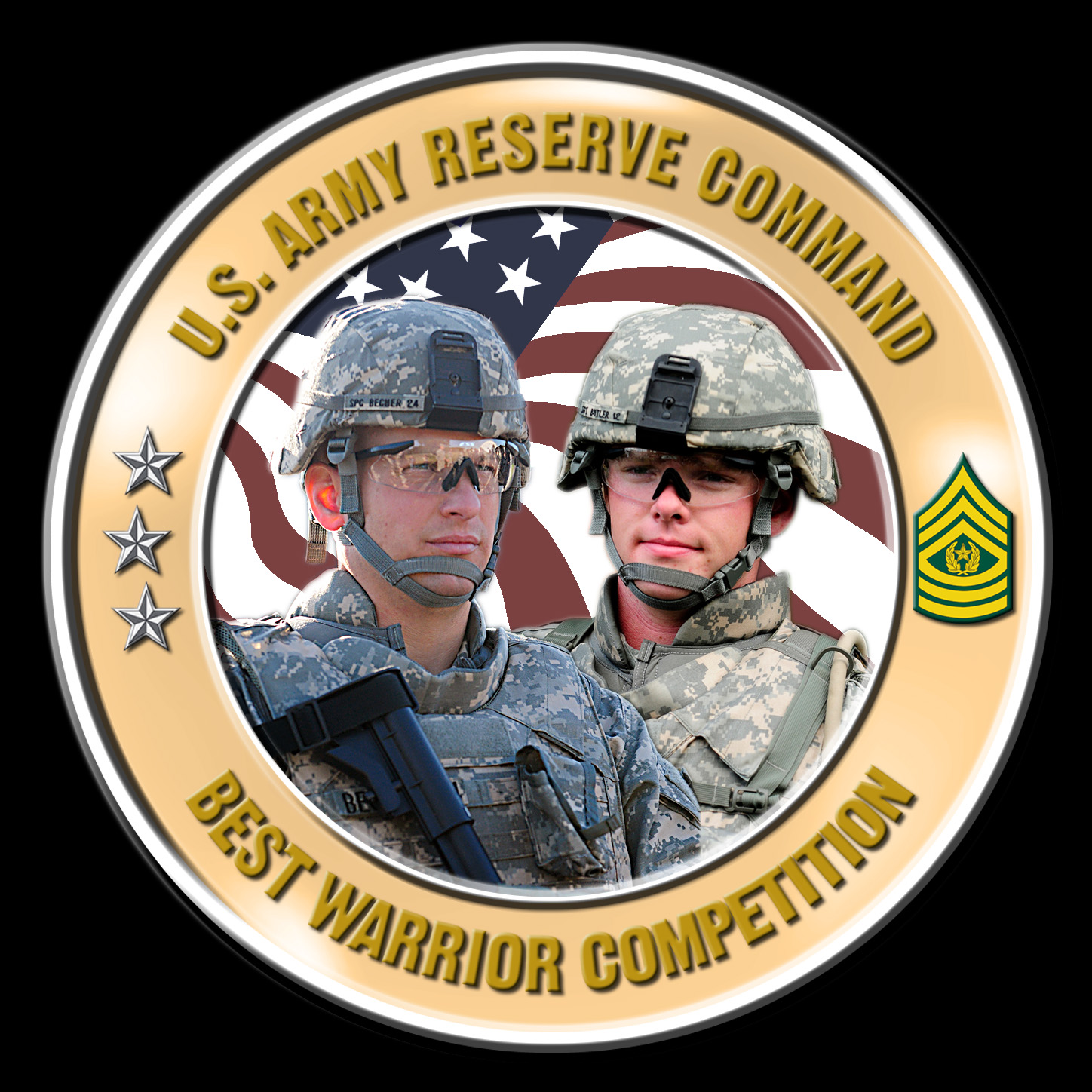
- Frequency: Annual
- Location: Fort Lee
- Years active: 25
- Website: www.army.mil/bestsquad/?from=features

Best Warrior is an annual competition overseen by the Department of the Army as a means of identifying and recognizing soldiers in active, Special Operations, National Guard and reserve components of the United States Army. Each year, each participating command sends their best enlisted soldier and non-commissioned officer to Fort Gregg-Adams to represent their unit.

During the competition, competitors are tested for their aptitude through board interviews, physical fitness tests, written exams, urban warfare simulations and other soldier tasks and drills relevant to the Army's operating environment.

In addition, Warriors will go before two selection boards composed of six senior sergeants major from across the Army. These boards, chaired by Sergeant Major of the Army Kenneth O. Preston, evaluate competitor appearance, military bearing and knowledge of critical Army topics.

The Soldier and Non-Commissioned Officer of the Year receive prestigious honors and cash awards in recognition of their achievements and represent the Army at special events throughout the year.

== Competition winners ==
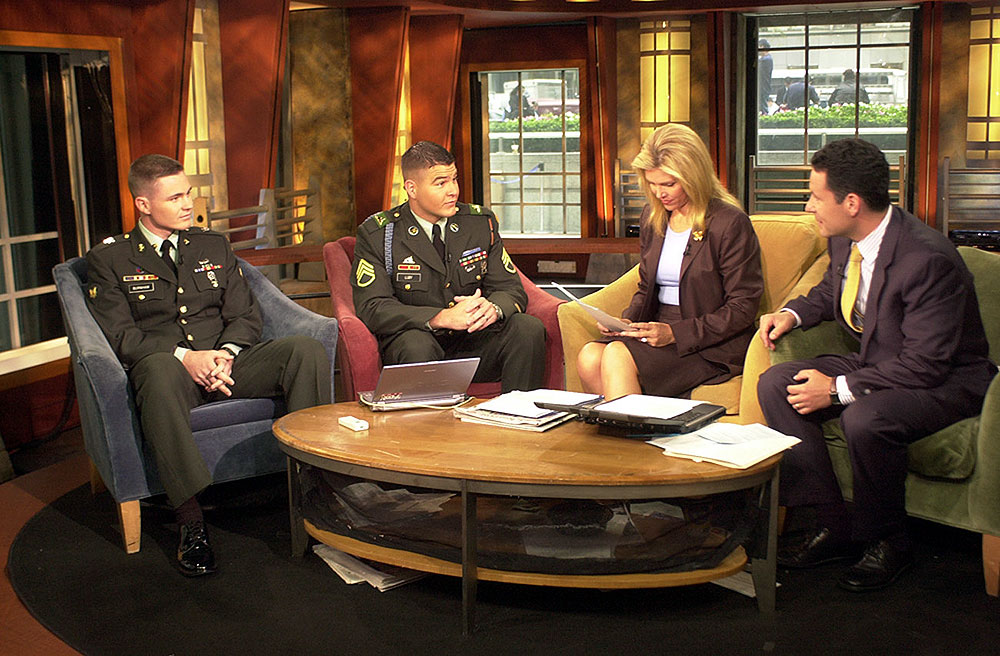
Department of the Army Soldier and NCO of the Year for 2003 Spc. Russell Adam Burnham and SSG James Luby on Fox and Friends

=== Soldier of the Year ===
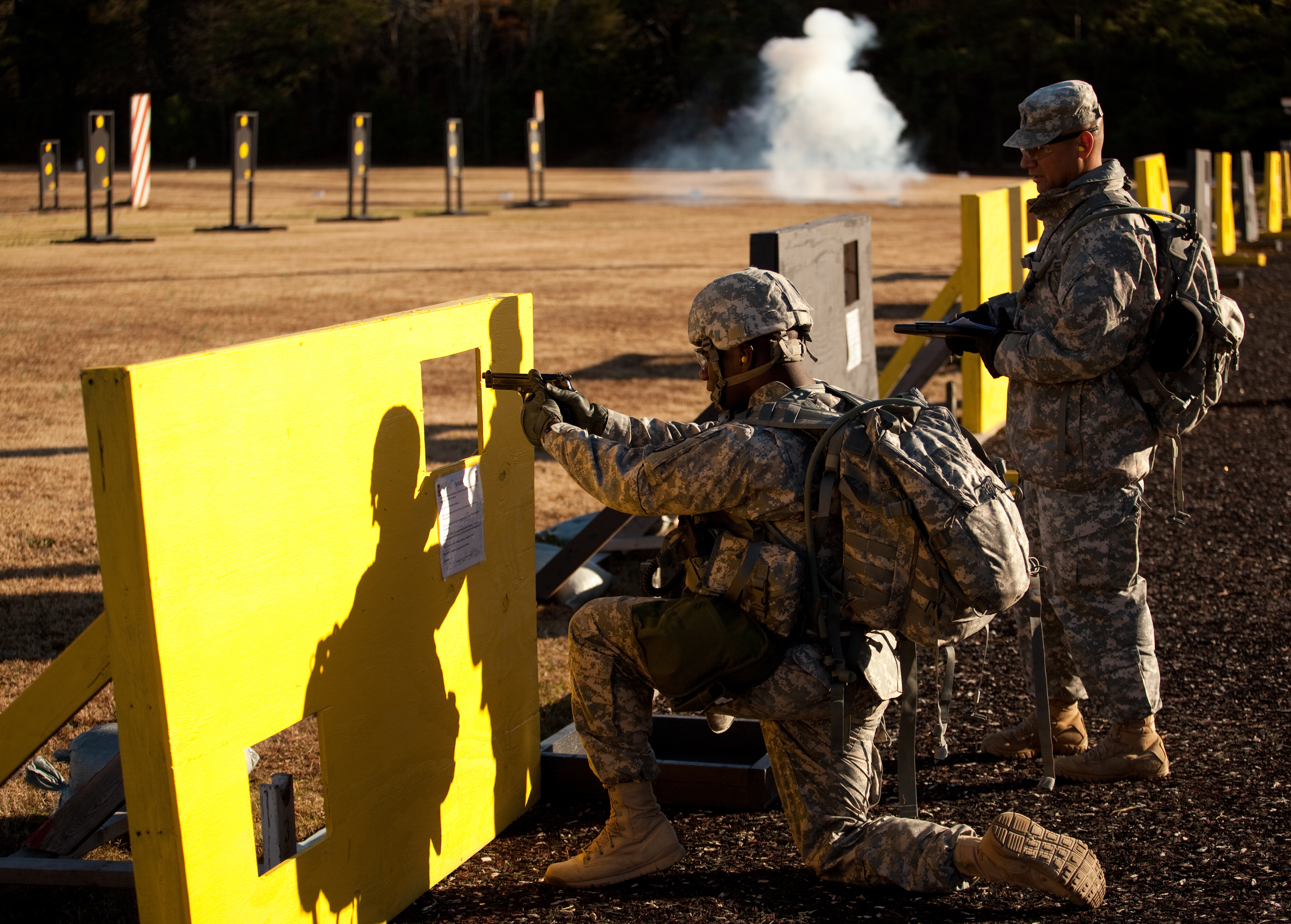
Pistol event at the 2014 competition

- 2002 - Spc. Justin Brown
- 2003 - Spc. Russell Adam Burnham (MEDCOM)
- 2004 - Spc. Wilfredo A Mendez
- 2005 - Sgt. Chad Steuck
- 2006 - Spc. John Emmett
- 2007 - Cpl. Heyz Seeker
- 2008 - Spc. David R. Obray (USARC)
- 2009 - Spc. Clancey Henderson
- 2010 - Sgt. Sherri Gallagher
- 2011 - Spc. Thomas M. Hauser
- 2012 - Spc. Saral Shrestha
- 2013 - Spc. Adam Christensen
- 2014 - Spc. Thomas Boyd
- 2015 - Spc. Jared R. Tansley (USAREUR)
- 2016 - Spc. Robert Miller
- 2017 - Spc. Hazen Ham
- 2018 - Cpl. Matthew Hagensick
- 2019 - Spc. David Chambers
- 2020 - Sgt. James Akinola

=== Non-Commissioned Officer of the Year ===
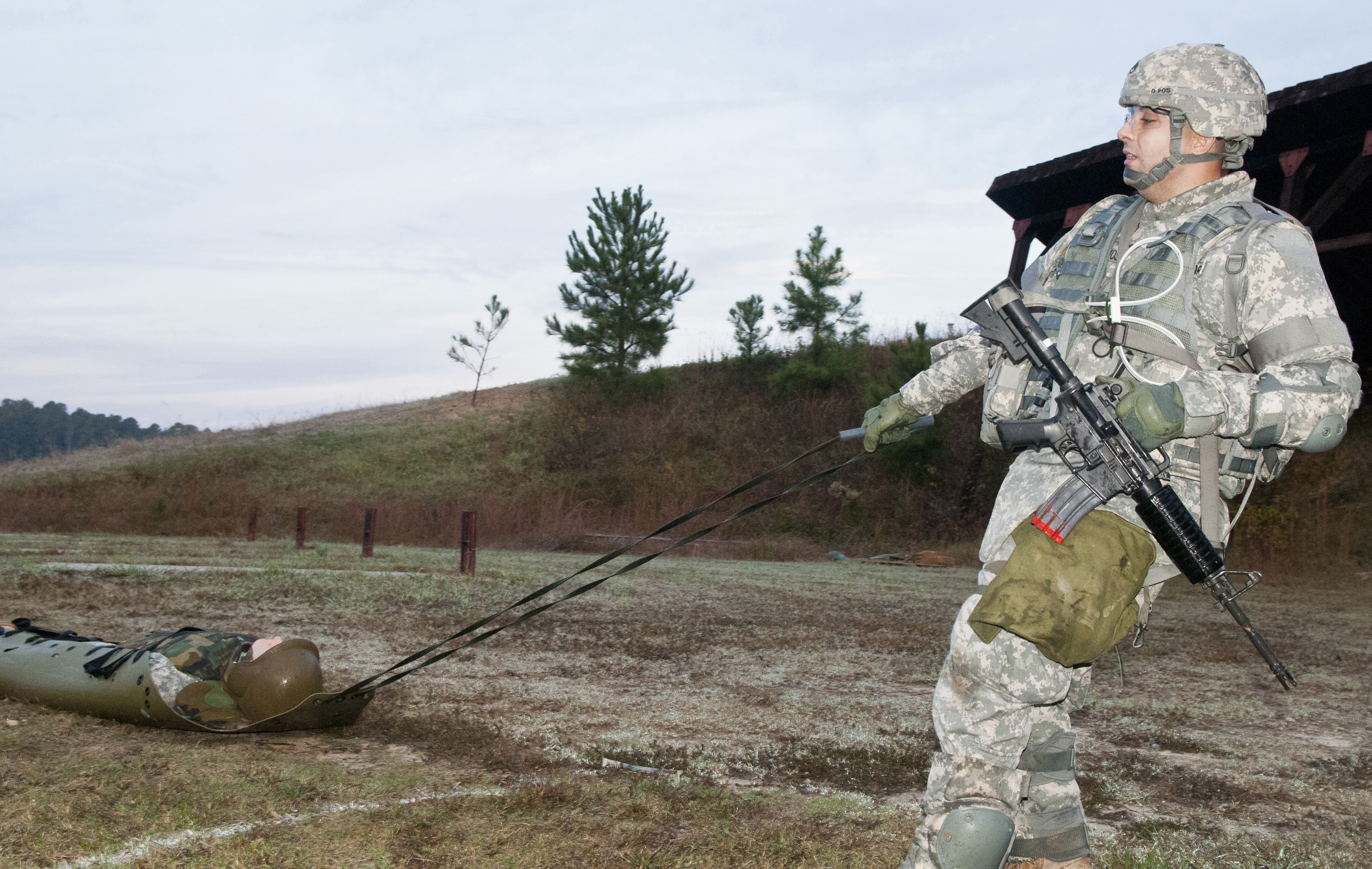
Competitor in 2012 pulling a mock casualty to safety

- 2002 - Sgt. 1st Class Jeffery T. Stitzel
- 2003 - Staff Sgt. James Luby
- 2004 - Staff Sgt. Andrew Bullock
- 2005 - Sgt. Jeremy Kamphuis
- 2006 - Sgt. 1st Class Jason Alexander
- 2007 - Staff Sgt. Jason Seifert
- 2008 - Staff Sgt. Noyce Merino NGB
- 2009 - Sgt. 1st Class Aaron Beckman
- 2010 - Staff Sgt. Christopher McDougall
- 2011 - Sgt. Guy Mellow
- 2012 - Staff Sgt. Matthew M. Senna
- 2013 - Sgt. 1st Class Jason J. Manella
- 2014 - Sgt. 1st Class Matthew Carpenter
- 2015 - Staff Sgt. Andrew Fink
- 2016 - Sgt. 1st Class Joshua A. Moeller
- 2017 - Staff Sgt. Ryan C. McCarthy
- 2018 - Sgt. 1st Class Sean Acosta
- 2019 - Staff Sgt. Dakota Bowen
- 2020 - Sgt. 1st Class Alexander Berger
