= Curtis Blakeman =

American politician

Member of the Illinois House of Representatives
- In office 1822–1826

Curtis Blakeman was an American politician who served as a member of the Illinois House of Representatives.

Blakeman served one of three state representatives representing Madison County in the 3rd Illinois General Assembly alongside George Churchill and Emanuel J. West. He was relected to the same seat in Madison County in the 1824 election to the 4th Illinois General Assembly alongside George Churchill and William Otwell.

His son, Curtis Blakeman Jr. also served in the Illinois State House (1842–1844 and 1846–1850).
