= 2nd Illinois General Assembly =

Term of state legislature in Illinois, US

Type
- Type: Bicameral
- Houses: Senate House of Representatives

Leadership
- President of the Senate: Pierre Menard, Independent
- Speaker of the House of Representatives: John McLean, Independent
- Seats: 14 Senators; 28 Representatives

Meeting place
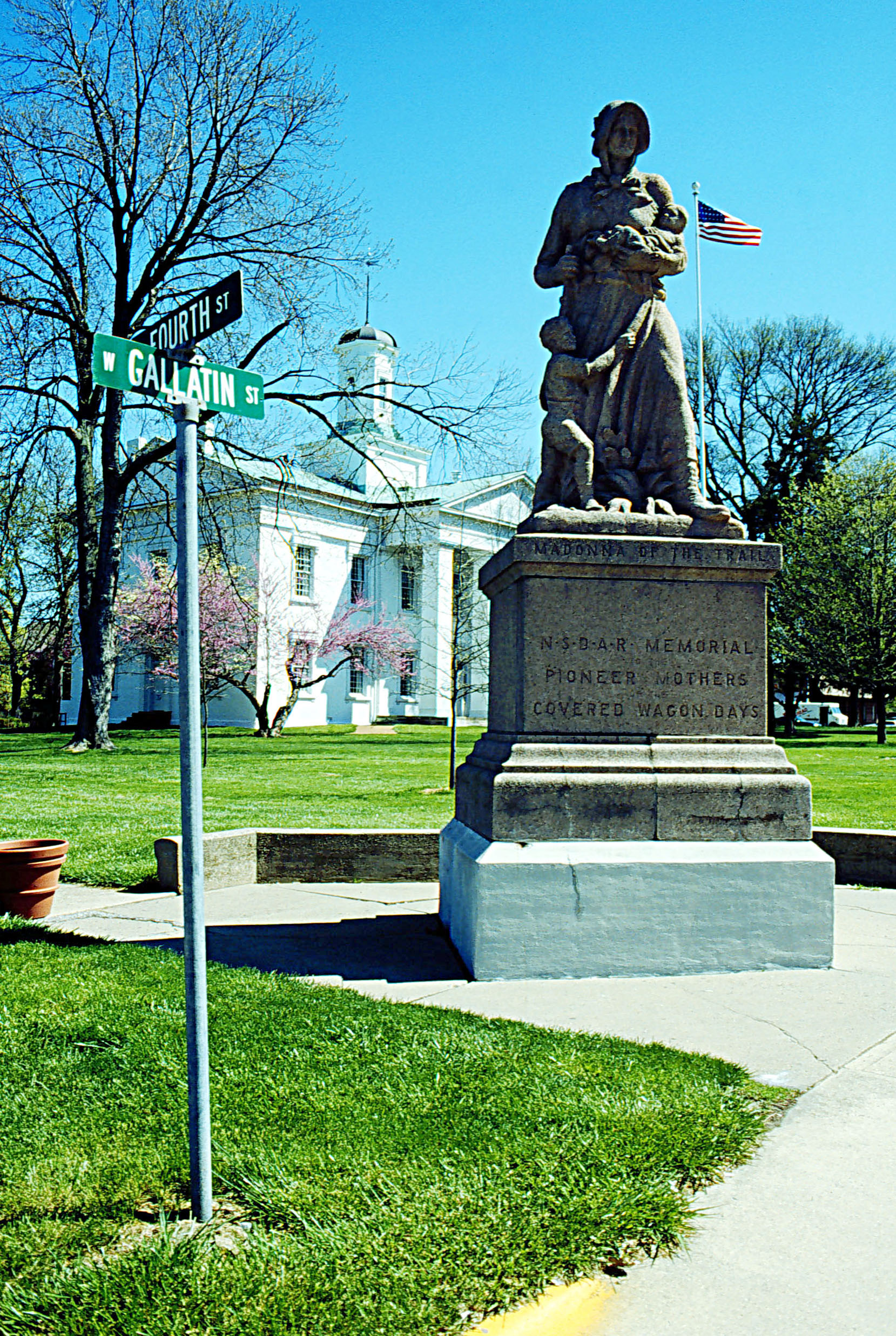
- Vandalia, Illinois

The 2nd Illinois General Assembly, consisting of the Illinois Senate and the Illinois House of Representatives, met from December 4, 1820, to February 15, 1821, during the second two years of Shadrach Bond's governorship, at The Vandalia State House. The apportionment of seats in the House of Representatives was based on the provisions of the First Illinois Constitution. Political parties were not established in the State at the time.

It was preceded by the 1st Illinois General Assembly. It was succeeded by the 3rd Illinois General Assembly.

== Members ==
This list is arranged by chamber, then by county. Senators and Representatives were both allotted to counties roughly by population and elected at-large within their districts. Four new counties were added in 1819: Alexander, Clark, Jefferson, and Wayne.

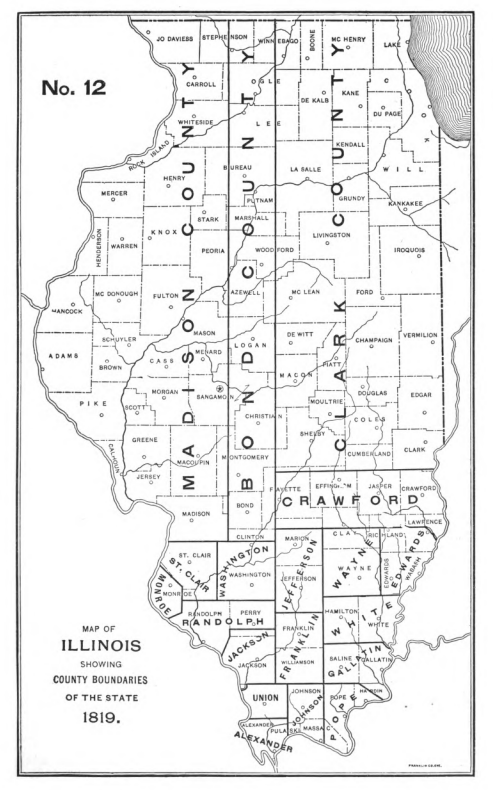
Map of Illinois county boundaries in 1819

Jurisdiction Represented	Image	Senator	Term	Remarks
Bond		Martin Jones	1820–1824	
Crawford · Clark		Joseph Kitchell	1818–1822	
Edwards · Wayne		Robert Frazier		
Gallatin		Michael Jones	1818–1822	
Jackson		William Boon		
Johnson · Franklin		Milton Ladd		
Madison		George Cadwell	1818–1822	
Monroe		Alexander Jamison	1818–1822	
Pope		Lewis Barker	1818–1822	
St. Clair		James Lemen Jr.		
Randolph		Samuel Crozier		
Union · Alexander		Edmund B. W. Jones		
Washington		Zariah Maddux	1818–1822	
White · Jefferson		Leonard White		Unsuccessfully contested by the incumbent senator Willis Hargrave

=== House of Representatives ===
Seats in County	Counties represented	Image	Representative	Remarks
1	Alexander		William M. Alexander	
1	Bond		William M. Crisp	
2	Crawford		Abraham Cairns	
2	Crawford		Wickliffe Kitchell	
1	Edwards		Moses Michaels	
1	Franklin		Thomas M. Dorris	
3	Gallatin		Henry Eddy	
3	Gallatin		Samuel McClintock	
3	Gallatin		John McLean	
1	Jackson		Conrad Will	
1	Johnson		William McFatridge	
3	Madison		Joseph Borough	
3	Madison		William Otwell	
3	Madison		Nathaniel Buckmaster	
1	Monroe		Enoch Moore	
1	Pope		Samuel Alexander	ousted, replaced by Samuel O'Melveny of Union County re-elected to the same seat in the 3rd Illinois General Assembly
1	Pope		Edward Robison	
3	St. Clair		David Blackwell	
3	St. Clair		Charles R. Matheny	
3	St. Clair		Risdon Moore	
2	Randolph		Thomas Mather	
2	Randolph		Raphael Widen	
1	Union		Samuel O'Melveny	completed term of Samuel Alexander of Pope County
1	Union		Richard M. Young	
1	Washington		Charles Slade	
1	Wayne		Alexander Campbell	
3	White		George R. Logan	
3	White		William B. McLean	
3	White		Alexander Phillips	

== Employees ==
=== Senate ===
- Secretary: James Turney
- Enrolling and Engrossing Clerk: Robert Lemen
- Doorkeeper: Ezra Owen

=== House of Representatives ===
- Clerk: Thomas Reynolds
- Enrolling and Engrossing Clerk: Charles Dunn
- Doorkeeper: Henry I. Mills

== See also ==
- List of Illinois state legislatures
