= William B. McLean (politician) =

American politician

Member of the Illinois House of Representatives
- In office 1820–1822

William B. McLean was an American politician who served as a member of the Illinois House of Representatives. He served as a state representative representing White County in the 2nd Illinois General Assembly.
