= Georgia Naval Militia =

The Georgia Naval Militia (GNM) is the legally-authorized but currently inactive naval militia of the U.S. state of Georgia. The Georgia Naval Militia, together with the Georgia National Guard and the Georgia State Defense Force, is a component of the organized militia of Georgia.

== History ==
The predecessor to the Georgia Naval Militia, the Georgia State Navy, was originally created by the colony of Georgia in July 1775 to protect shipping interests in Savannah. The navy consisted of four galleys, whose funding was provided by the Continental Congress.

The General Assembly created the Georgia Naval Militia on December 19, 1893. By the next year, Companies A and B of the Naval Reserve Artillery were organized in Brunswick and Savannah, Georgia, respectively. The naval militia trained with the federal navy on various ships, including USS Amphitrite and USS Prairie. The federal government gave the USS Passaic to the Georgia Naval Militia, delivering it on July 30, 1896; it remained available for the Georgia Naval Militia for the next two years.

The Georgia Naval Militia was mustered out of service in November 1911.

== Legal status ==
Naval militias of U.S. states are recognized by the federal government of the United States under 10 U.S.C. § 7851. Georgia law also recognizes the naval militia as a component of the organized militia. Therefore, an executive order by the Governor of Georgia or an act of legislature would be legally sufficient to reactivate the Georgia Naval Militia.

== See also ==
- Civil Air Patrol
- State defense force
- United States Coast Guard Auxiliary
- United States Naval Sea Cadet Corps
- United States Power Squadrons
