= Edmund B. W. Jones =

American politician

Member of the Illinois Senate
- In office 1820–1822

Edmund B. W. Jones was an American politician who served as a member of the Illinois Senate. He served as a state senator representing Union County and Alexander County in the 2nd Illinois General Assembly.
