= 3rd Illinois General Assembly =

Term of state legislature in Illinois, US

Type
- Type: Bicameral
- Houses: Senate House of Representatives

Leadership
- President of the Senate: Adolphus Hubbard, Independent
- Speaker of the House of Representatives: William M. Alexander, Independent
- Seats: 18 Senators; 36 Representatives

Meeting place
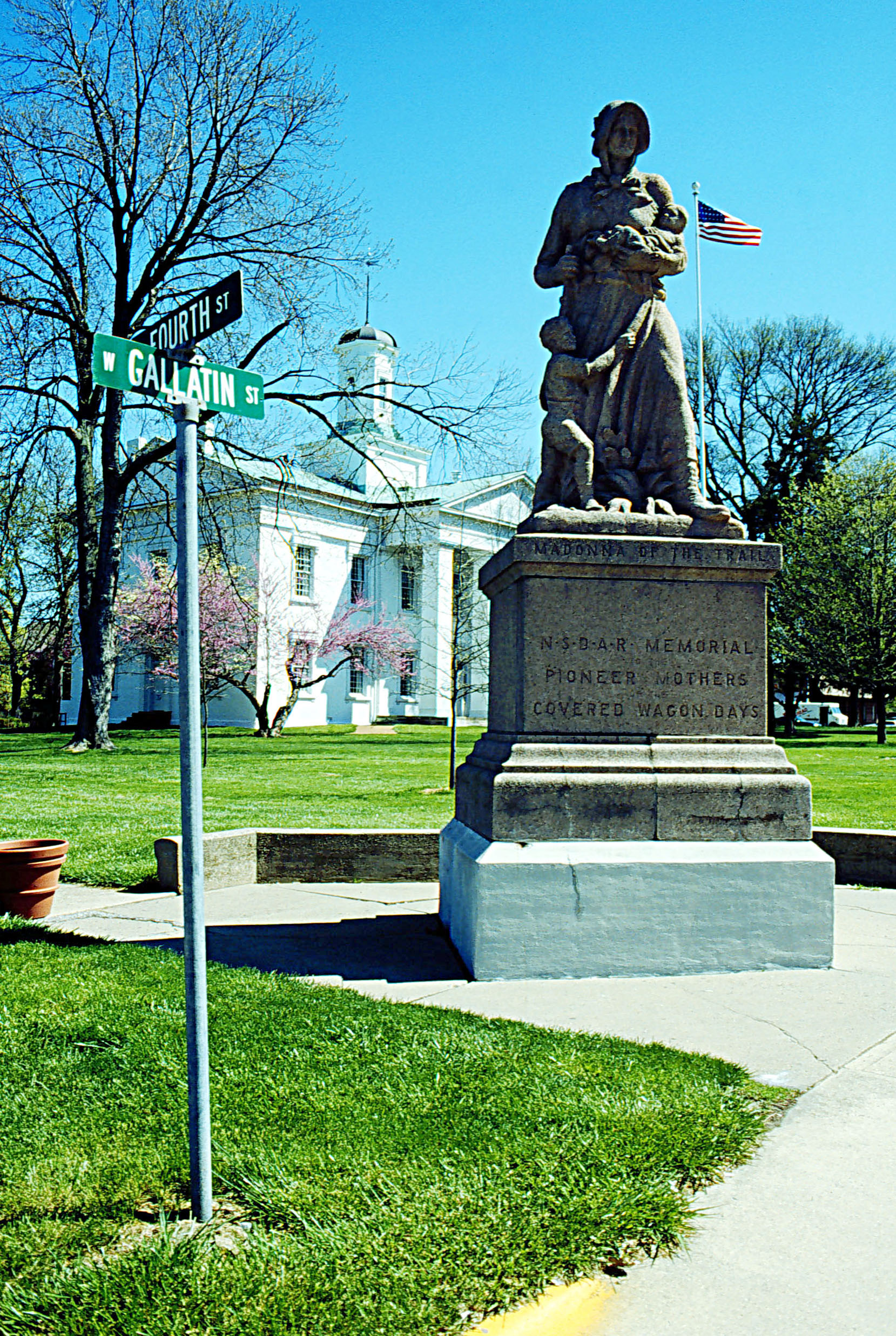
- Vandalia, Illinois

The 3rd Illinois General Assembly, consisting of the Illinois State Senate and the Illinois House of Representatives, met from December 2, 1822, to February 18, 1823, during the first two years of Edward Coles' governorship, at The Vandalia State House. The apportionment of seats in the House of Representatives was based on the provisions of the First Illinois Constitution. Political parties were not established in the State at the time.

The 3rd General Assembly was preceded by the 2nd Illinois General Assembly, and was succeeded by the 4th Illinois General Assembly.

== Members ==
This list is arranged by chamber, then by county. Senators and Representatives were both allotted to counties roughly by population and elected at-large within their districts.

Legislation passed on February 14, 1821 fixed the Senate at 18 members and the House at 36 members; and established apportionment by county.

Six new counties were added in 1821: Lawrenece, Greene, Sangamon, Hamilton, and Montgomery.

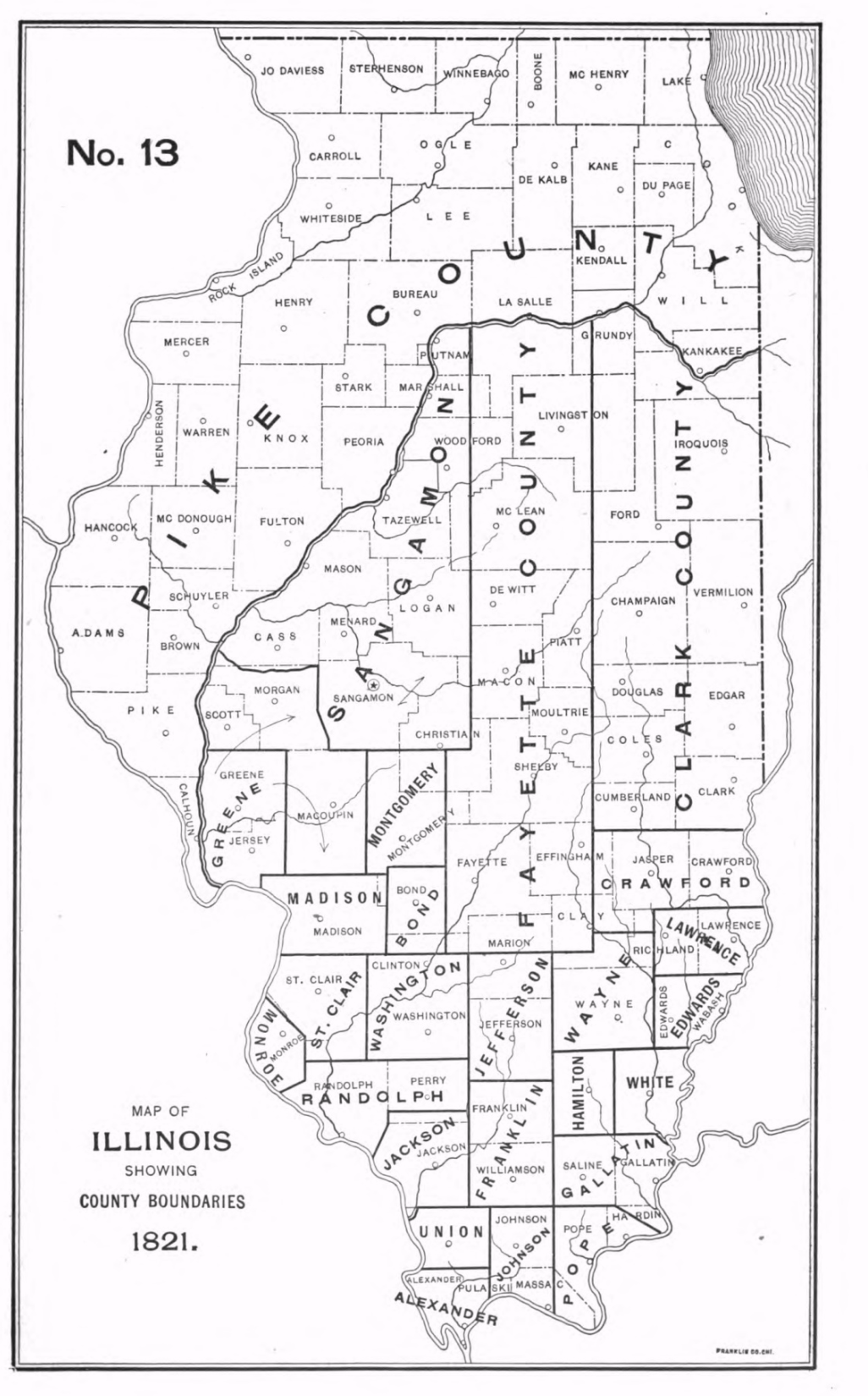
Map of Illinois county boundaries in 1821

=== Senate ===
Jurisdiction Represented	Image	Senator	Remarks
Bond • Fayette • Montgomery		Martin Jones	
Clark • Crawford		Daniel Parker	
Edwards		Robert Frazier	
Gallatin		Michael Jones	
Greene • Pike		George Cadwell	
Jefferson • Hamilton		Thomas Sloo	
Jackson		William Boon	
Franklin • Johnson		Milton Ladd	
Lawrence • Wayne		William Kinkade	
Madison		Theophilus Smith	
Monroe		Joseph Beaird	
Pope		Lewis Barker	
Randolph		Samuel Crozier	
Sangamon		Stephen Stillman	
St. Clair		William Kinney	
Alexander • Union		John Grammer	
Washington		Andrew Bankson	
White		Leonard White	

=== House of Representatives ===
Seats in County	Counties represented	Image	Representative	Remarks
1	Alexander		William M. Alexander	
1	Bond		Jonathan C. Pugh	
1	Clark		William Lowry	
2	Crawford		Robert C. Ford	
2	Crawford		David McGahey	
1	Edwards		Gilbert T. Pell	
1	Fayette • Montgomery		William Berry	
1	Franklin		Thomas M. Dorris	
2	Gallatin		John G. Daimwood	
2	Gallatin		Marmaduke S. Davenport	
1	Greene		Thomas Rattan	
1	Jackson		Conrad Will	
1	Hamilton • Jefferson		Zadok Casey	
1	Johnson		William McFatridge	
1	Lawrence		Abraham Cairns	
3	Madison		Curtis Blakeman	
3	Madison		George Churchill	
3	Madison		Emanuel J. West	
1	Monroe		William Alexander	
1	Pike		Nicholas Hansen	ousted
1	Pike		John Shaw	replaced Hansen
2	Pope		Samuel Alexander	
2	Pope		James A. Whiteside	
3	Randolph		Thomas Mather	
3	Randolph		John McFerron	
3	Randolph		Raphael Widen	
1	Sangamon		James Simms	
3	St. Clair		Joseph Trotier	
3	St. Clair		Risdon Moore	
3	St. Clair		Jacob Ogle	
2	Union		Alexander Pope Field	
2	Union		John McIntosh	
1	Washington		James Turney	resigned February 18, 1823 to serve as the Attorney General of Illinois
1	Wayne		Alexander Campbell	
3	White		John Emmett	
3	White		George R. Logan	
3	White		Alexander Phillips	

== Employees ==
=== Senate ===
- Secretary: Thomas Lippincott
- Enrolling and Engrossing Clerk: H.S. Dodge
- Doorkeeper: John O. Prentice

=== House of Representatives ===
- Clerk: Charles Dunn
- Enrolling and Engrossing Clerk: H.S. Dodge, Winsted Davie
- Doorkeeper: John Lee

== See also ==
- List of Illinois state legislatures

== Works cited ==
- Moses, John (1892). Illinois, historical and statistical.
- Blue Book of the State of Illinois. 1919.
- Pease, Theodore Calvin (1923). Statistical Series: Illinois Election Returns (1818-1848). Vol. 1. Illinois State Historical Library.
