= William Lowry (Illinois politician) =

American politician

Member of the Illinois House of Representatives
- In office 1822–1824

William Lowry was an American politician who served as a member of the Illinois House of Representatives.

Lowry served as a state representative for Clark County winning election to the 3rd Illinois General Assembly after defeating Septer Patrick by a vote of 51-26. He ran for relection in 1824 representing Clark County and the newly formed Edgar County (which had been carved out of Clark County) but was narrowly defeated by William B. Archer by a vote of 191-184.

His surname is also rendered Lowrey.
