= Samuel McClintock =

American politician

Member of the Illinois House of Representatives
- In office 1832–1834

Member of the Illinois House of Representatives
- In office 1818–1822

Samuel McClintock was an American politician who served as a member of the Illinois House of Representatives.

He served as a state representative representing Gallatin County in the 1st Illinois General Assembly, the 2nd Illinois General Assembly, and the 8th Illinois General Assembly.
