= Marmaduke S. Davenport =

American politician

Member of the Illinois House of Representatives
- In office 1822–1824
- Nickname: James S. Davanport

Marmaduke S. Davenport was an American politician who served as a member of the Illinois House of Representatives.

Davenport served as one of two state representatives for Gallatin County in the 3rd Illinois General Assembly serving along with John G. Daimwood.
