= Zariah Maddux =

American politician

Member of the Illinois Senate
- In office 1818–1822

Zariah Maddux was an American politician who served as a member of the Illinois Senate. He served as a state senator representing Washington County in the 1st and 2nd Illinois General Assemblies.
