= Henry Eddy (politician) =

American politician

Member of the Illinois House of Representatives
- In office 1820–1822

Member of the Illinois House of Representatives
- In office 1846–1848

Henry Eddy was an American politician who served as a member of the Illinois House of Representatives.

He served as a state representative representing Gallatin County in the 2nd Illinois General Assembly and the 15th Illinois General Assembly.
