= Samuel O'Melveny =

American politician

Member of the Territorial Legislature of Illinois
- In office 1816–1817

Member of the Illinois Senate
- In office 1820–1821
- Preceded by: Samuel Alexander
- Succeeded by: Samuel Alexander

Personal details
- Born: Ireland
- Died: 1828

Samuel O'Melveny was an American politician who served as a member of the Third Territorial Legislature of Illinois and the Illinois House of Representatives.

O'Melveny was born in Ireland and resided in Kentucky before moving to Pope County in 1816 where he served as the first county treasurer. He led a group of some 60 Irish settlers to form a colony 15 miles north of Golconda in Pope County, Illinois.

In 1816, he served in the 2nd session of the 3rd Illinois Territorial Legislature. He was a signatory of the First Illinois Constitutional Convention.

In 1819, he moved to Randolph County.

He served as a state representative representing Pope County in the 2nd Illinois General Assembly, after the ouster of Samuel Alexander.

O'Melveny died in 1828.
