= Robert C. Ford =

American politician

Member of the Illinois House of Representatives
- In office 1822–1824
- Nickname: R. C. Ford

Robert C. Ford was an American politician who served as a member of the Illinois House of Representatives.

Ford served as one of two state representatives for Crawford County in the 3rd Illinois General Assembly along with David McGahey.
