= William Kinkade (Illinois politician) =

American politician

Member of the Illinois Senate
- In office 1822–1824

William Kinkade was an American politician who served as a member of the Illinois Senate. He served as a state senator representing Lawrence County in the 3rd Illinois General Assembly.
