= William Clinton Tichenor =

American politician

Member of the Illinois Senate
- In office 1848–1849

William Clinton Tichenor was an American politician who served as a member of the Illinois Senate.

== Biography ==
Tichenor was born on June 13, 1813, in Newark, New Jersey. He served as a state senator representing the 9th district (Clark, Crawford, and Edgar counties) in the 16th Illinois General Assembly.

He served in the Oregon Legislature and in the Oregon Senate.
