= James Sims =

James Sims may refer to:

- James Sims (American football) (born 1983), American football running back
- James Sims (physician) (1741–1820), Anglo-Irish physician
- James Leland Sims (1905–1977), member of the Legislative Assembly of Alberta
- J. Marion Sims (1813–1883), American physician

== See also ==
- James Simms (disambiguation)
