= Emanuel J. West =

American politician

Member of the Illinois House of Representatives
- In office 1822–1824

Emanuel J. West was an American politician who served as a member of the Illinois House of Representatives.

Davenport served as one of three state representatives for Madison County in the 3rd Illinois General Assembly serving alongside Curtis Blakeman and George Churchill. He unsuccessfully ran for relection for the same seat in the 4th and the 6th General Assemblies.
