= William McFatridge =

American politician

Member of the Illinois House of Representatives
- In office 1820–1824

William McFatridge was an American politician who served as a member of the Illinois House of Representatives.

He served as a state representative representing Johnson County in the 2nd Illinois General Assembly and 3rd Illinois General Assembly.
