= USS Passaic (1862) =

1862 Passaic-class ironclad monitor

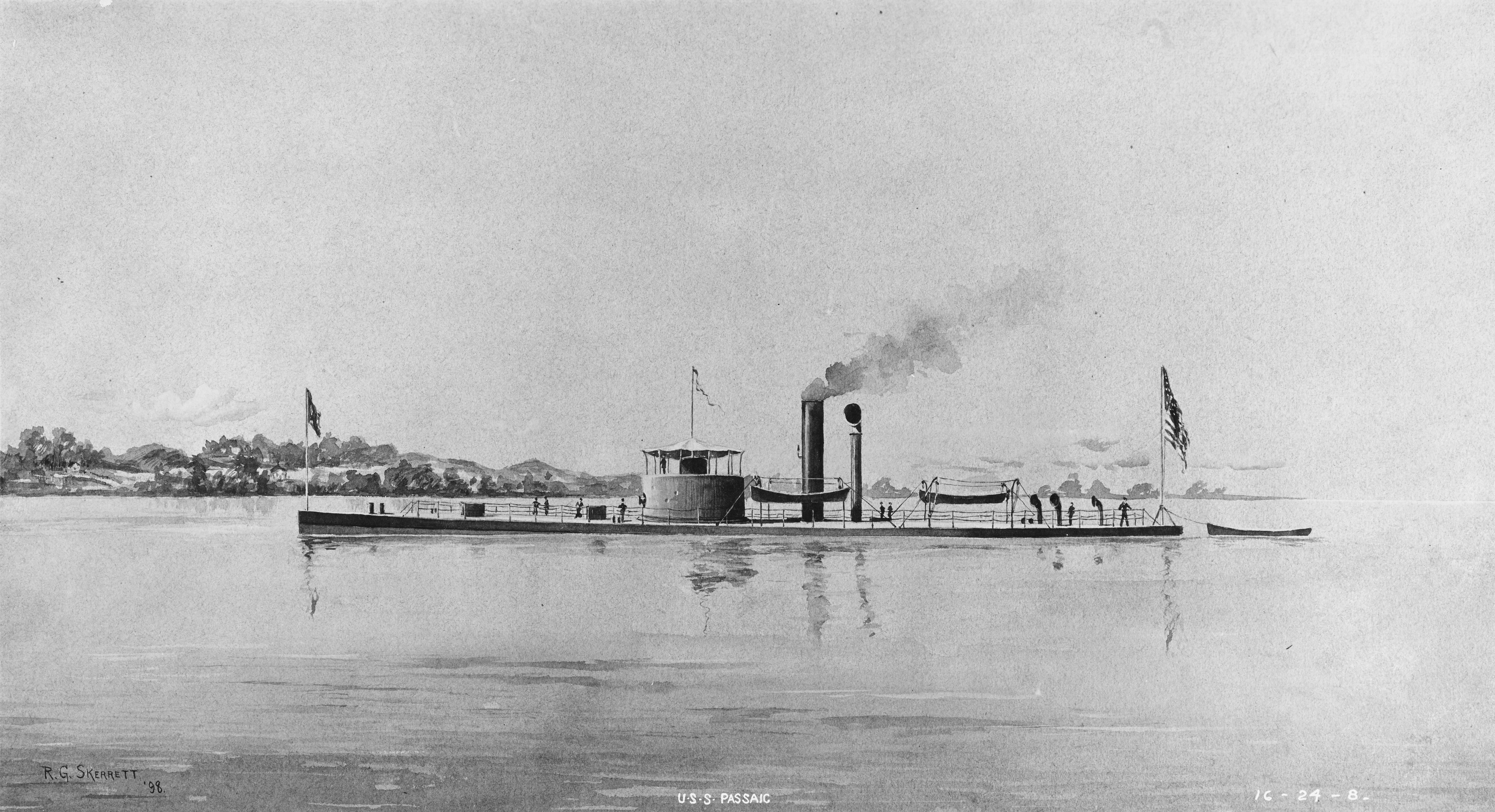
- Wash drawing of USS Passaic as she would have appeared during the American Civil War

History

United States
- Name: Passaic
- Builder: Continental Iron Works
- Launched: 30 August 1862
- Commissioned: 25 November 1862
- Decommissioned: 11 September 1898
- Fate: Sold, 10 October 1899

General characteristics
- Class & type: Passaic-class monitor
- Displacement: 1,355 tons
- Length: 200 ft (61 m) overall
- Beam: 46 ft (14 m)
- Draft: 12 ft 6 in (3.81 m)
- Propulsion: 2 Martin boilers, 1-shaft Ericsson vibrating lever engine, 320 ihp (240 kW)
- Speed: 7 knots (13 km/h; 8.1 mph)
- Complement: 85
- Armament: 1 × 15 in (380 mm) smoothbore gun; 1 × 11 in (280 mm) smoothbore gun
- Armor: Iron; Side: 5–3 in (127–76 mm); Turret: 11 in (280 mm); Deck: 1 in (25 mm)

The first Passaic was a single turreted, coastal monitor purchased by the United States Navy for service during the American Civil War.

== Built in New York ==
Passaic, first of a ten-ship class of 1335-ton ironclad monitors, was built by Continental Iron Works, Greenpoint, Brooklyn, New York, under subcontract from John Ericsson. The engine was built by Delemater Iron Works and it had a propeller of cast iron, 12 ft (4 m) in diameter. It was launched 30 August 1862; and commissioned 25 November 1862, Captain Percival Drayton in command.

== Civil War service ==
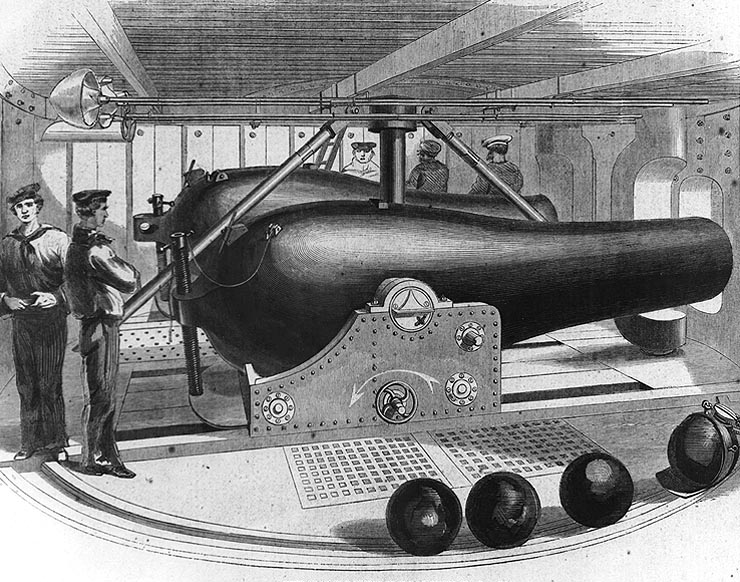
Inside the gun turret of Passaic

George Cook, half stereo of Federal ironclads Weehawken, Montauk and New Ironsides firing on Fort Moultrie, 8 September 1863 - The Valentine, Richmond, Virginia.

Two days later the new monitor departed New York and joined the North Atlantic Blockading Squadron at Hampton Roads on 29 November but was immediately sent to the Washington Navy Yard for repairs. There President Abraham Lincoln visited the ship with members of his cabinet 6 December. After returning to Hampton Roads on 26 December, Passaic, towed by USS State of Georgia, got underway three days later with USS Monitor, towed by USS Rhode Island, heading for Beaufort, North Carolina. Encountering bad weather off Cape Hatteras, North Carolina, she leaked badly and was forced to work her pumps and throw all shot overboard to remain afloat, but she reached Beaufort on New Year's Day 1863. Monitor foundered during the storm.

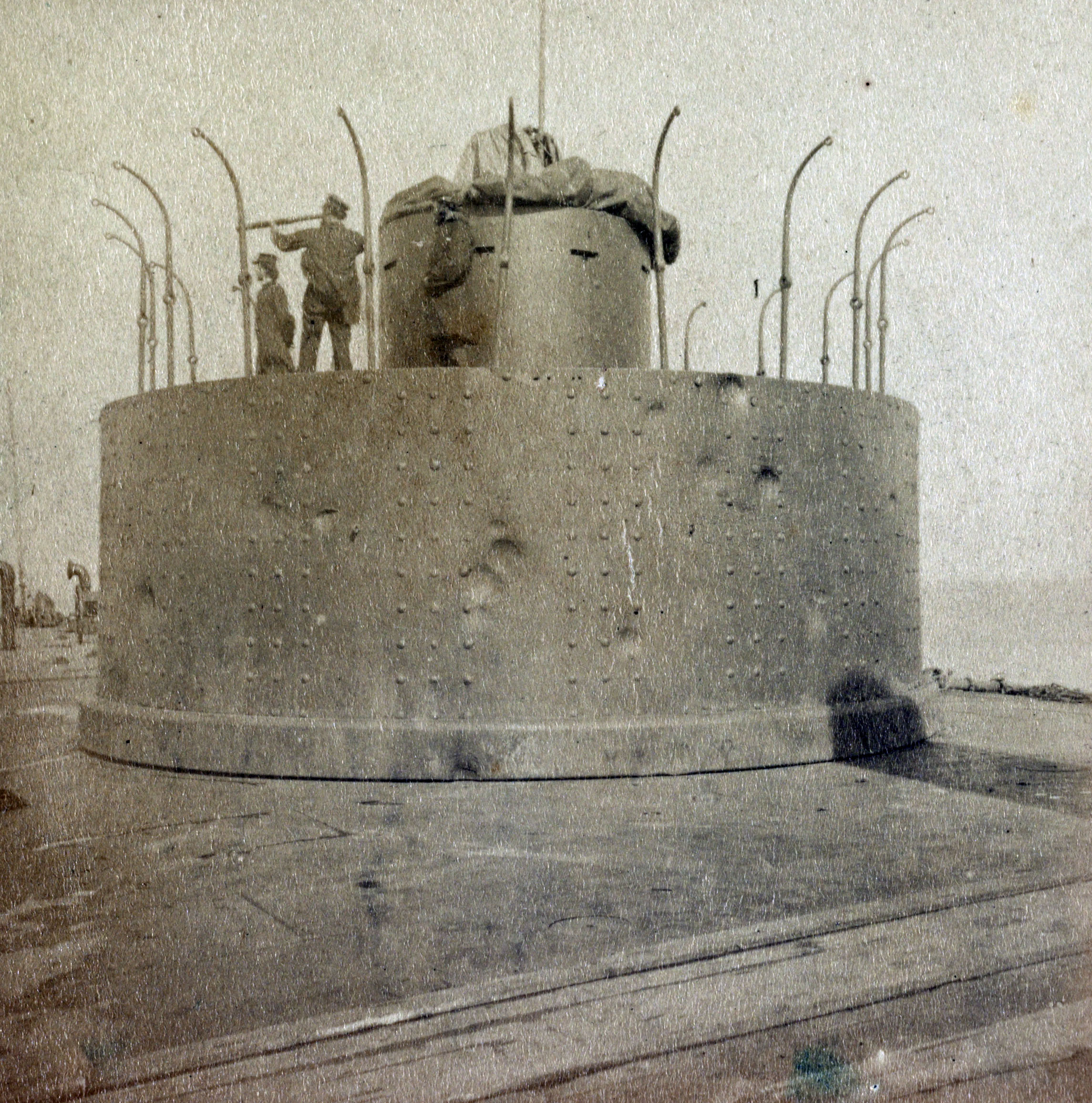
The turret of Passiac showing some of the fifteen marks where she was hit by rebel shot

Anchoring off Port Royal, South Carolina, on 21 January, she proceeded to Wassaw Sound. On 23 February with USS Marblehead, Passaic captured schooner Glide laden with cotton. With her sister monitors, Passaic attacked Fort McAllister to test her fighting capabilities in action. On 7 April, she took part in Rear Admiral Samuel F. Du Pont's attack on Charleston, South Carolina. Severely battered during the engagement, she returned to New York and decommissioned for repairs 12 May.

Recommissioned 19 July, Passaic arrived off Morris Island in Charleston Harbor on 25 July, and took part in all operations against that place. Rear Admiral John A. Dahlgren used her as his flagship during the attack on Fort Moultrie, and she assisted in rescuing USS Lehigh when that monitor ran aground under the fire of Fort Moultrie.

== Post-war service ==
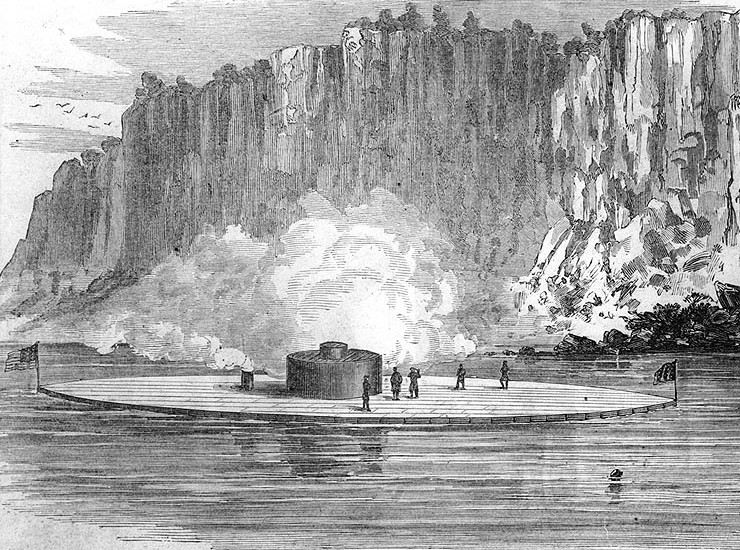
Passaic in gun trials at the palisades, November 15 1862. Harper's Weekly illustration.

On 16 June 1865, Passaic decommissioned at the Philadelphia Navy Yard and was laid up there from 1866 to 1874. Repaired during the following year, she recommissioned in Hampton Roads, 24 November 1876. From 1878 to 1882 she served as receiving ship at Washington, D.C. From 1883 to 1892 she was stationed at the Naval Academy, Annapolis, Maryland, and from 1893 to 1894 at the Navy Yard, Boston, Massachusetts. During 1895 and 1896 she was loaned to the Massachusetts Naval Militia and during the next two years to the Georgia Naval Militia at Brunswick, Georgia.

On 16 May 1898 Passaic was again recommissioned, assigned to the Naval Auxiliary Force and sent to Key West and Pensacola, Florida.

== Decommissioning and sale ==
She was decommissioned at the Pensacola Navy Yard in Pensacola on 11 September 1898, and sold to Frank Samuels on 10 October 1899.

== Bibliography ==
- Additional technical data from Gardiner, Robert (1979). Conway's All the World's Fighting Ships 1860–1905. Conway Maritime Press. p. 120. ISBN 0-85177-133-5.
- Wright, Christopher C. (June 2021). "Canonicus at Jamestown, 1907". Warship International. LVIII (2): 126–162. ISSN 0043-0374.
