= James Simms (Illinois politician) =

American politician

Member of the Illinois House of Representatives
- In office 1822–1824

James Simms was an American politician who served as a member of the Illinois House of Representatives.

Simms served as a state representatives for Sangamon County in the 3rd Illinois General Assembly after narrowly defeating John Scott in the August 5, 1822 general election.

His surname is also spelled as Sims.
