= James Simms (Newfoundland official) =

Newfoundland politician

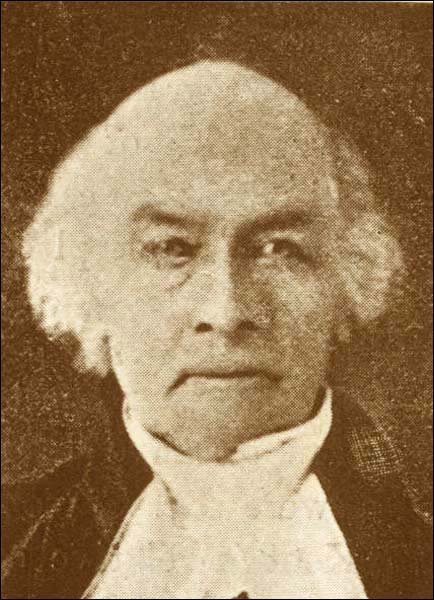
Simms at an unknown date

James Simms (June 3, 1780 – January 2, 1863) was a lawyer and merchant in Newfoundland. He was a member of the Legislative Council of Newfoundland from 1832 to 1846 and served as Attorney General for the colony from 1827 to 1846.

The son of William and Mary Simms, he was born in Birmingham, England and was educated in West Bromwich, going on to study law in Birmingham or London. Simms arrived in Newfoundland in 1809, settling in St. John's. He practised law and also was involved in the cod trade, operating in St. John's and Twillingate. In 1825, Simms became acting Attorney General; in 1827, he was officially named to the post. Simms was opposed to representative government for the colony and often clashed with the elected assembly during his time on the Legislative Council. He served as acting chief justice for the Supreme Court in 1833 and 1844. In 1846, Simms was named an assistant judge for the Supreme Court and served in the position until 1858, when he retired due to poor health.

He retired to England, where he died at Tulse Hill, Surrey in 1863.
