= Charles R. Matheny =

American politician

Member of the Illinois House of Representatives
- In office 1820–1822

Charles R. Matheny was an American politician who served as a member of the Illinois House of Representatives.

He served as a state representative representing St. Clair County in the 2nd Illinois General Assembly.
