= George R. Logan =

American politician

Member of the Illinois House of Representatives
- In office 1820–1826

George R. Logan was an American politician who served as a member of the Illinois House of Representatives. He served as a state representative representing White County in the 2nd Illinois General Assembly, the 3rd Illinois General Assembly, and the 4th Illinois General Assembly.
