= Joseph Kitchell =

American politician

Member of the Illinois Senate
- In office 1818–1822
- Preceded by: Inaugural
- Succeeded by: Daniel Parker

Joseph Kitchell was an American politician who served as a member of the Illinois Senate. In the September 17, 1818 election, he was elected to a 4-year term as a state senator representing Crawford County which spanned the 1st and 2nd Illinois General Assemblies.
