= Alexander Phillips (politician) =

American politician

Member of the Illinois House of Representatives
- In office 1818–1826

Member of the Illinois House of Representatives
- In office 1838–1842

Alexander Phillips was an American politician who served as a member of the Illinois House of Representatives. He served as a state representative representing White County in the 1st Illinois General Assembly, the 2nd Illinois General Assembly, the 3rd Illinois General Assembly the 4th Illinois General Assembly, the 11th Illinois General Assembly, and the 12th Illinois General Assembly.
