= Samuel Snowden Hayes =

American politician

Member of the Illinois House of Representatives from the 7th district
- In office 1848 – 1850
- Preceded by: n/a (Note: Prior to 1848, seats on the Illinois House of Representatives were awarded by county, not district.)
- Succeeded by: Samuel H. Martin

Member of the Illinois House of Representatives from White County
- In office 1846 – 1848

Personal details
- Born: December 25, 1820 Nashville, Tennessee
- Died: January 28, 1880 (aged 59) Chicago, Illinois
- Resting place: Rosehill Cemetery
- Party: Democratic
- Profession: Attorney

Samuel Snowden Hayes (December 25, 1820 – January 28, 1880) was an American politician from Tennessee. Hayes moved to Illinois after a family tragedy and eventually established a successful law practice in Carmi. He became a prominent politician in White County, serving two terms in the Illinois House of Representatives and attending the 1848 state constitutional convention. He was a staunch supporter of the Democratic Party and often campaigned on their behalf. He moved to Chicago, Illinois in 1850 and became one of the city's leading Democratic voices preceding the Civil War. From 1858, he supported Stephen A. Douglas and championed him at the 1860 Democratic National Convention. He was one of the three delegates on the United States Revenue Commission in 1865.

== Biography ==
Samuel Snowden Hayes was born in Nashville, Tennessee on December 25, 1820. He descended from early American families from both his parents. His mother died in 1828 and the family moved to Cincinnati, Ohio three years later. In 1837, his father died when a servant poisoned a family meal with arsenic. To support his family, Hayes moved to Louisville, Kentucky to work in a drug store as a clerk. The next year, he bought a stock of pharmaceuticals and moved west to Shawneetown, Illinois to open his own shop. He sold his shop after two years and used the proceeds to fund an education in law. He studied at the Henry Eddy; future US Representative Samuel S. Marshall was a fellow student there at the time.

Hayes was admitted to the bar in 1842 and moved to Mount Vernon, Illinois to practice. After a short term there, he opened a practice in Carmi, Illinois. He took an interest in politics and canvassed Southern Illinois in favor of Democrat James K. Polk for the 1844 presidential election. He attended the 1845 commercial convention in Memphis, Tennessee and drew acclaim for his critique of John C. Calhoun.

Hayes was elected to the Illinois House of Representatives in 1846 and served two two-year terms. In 1847, Hayes was a delegate to the Illinois State Constitutional Convention of 1847, where he was appointed Chairman of the Committee on Law Reform. Hayes again canvassed Southern Illinois for the Democratic Party in 1848, supporting Lewis Cass for President. He was a presidential elector for that election. Governor of Illinois Augustus C. French named Hayes an honorary Colonel, an advisory position.

In the winter of 1850, with his second legislature term expired, Hayes moved to Chicago, Illinois to open a law practice. Shortly after his arrival, he was named Counselor and City Solicitor. Hayes campaigned against the Kansas–Nebraska Act in 1854, but did not break from supporting the Democratic Party, supporting James Buchanan in the 1856 presidential election.

After Buchanan supported slave state status for Kansas in 1858, Hayes shifted his support to Stephen A. Douglas and remained his close political ally. He supported Douglas as a delegate to the two 1860 Democratic National Conventions. Like Douglas, Hayes supported reconciliation with the South after the election of Abraham Lincoln and supported the Union when the American Civil War broke out months later. Hayes was named City Comptroller of Chicago in 1862, retiring three years later. He then served with David Ames Wells and Stephen Colwell on the United States Revenue Commission, a group empowered to investigate how to raise revenue to cover expenses from the war. Hayes was a delegate to the Illinois Constitutional Convention of 1870.

Hayes married Lizzie J. Taylor, the eldest daughter of Edmund Dick Taylor, around 1850. He served multiple terms on the Chicago Board of Education. An elementary school in the city was later named after him. He was a trustee of the Illinois Industrial University from 1867 to 1870.

Hayes died at his home in Chicago on January 28, 1880, and was buried at Rosehill Cemetery.

Hayes Drive in Jackson Park was named for him.
