= Risdon Moore =

American politician

Member of the Illinois House of Representatives
- In office 1818–1826

Risdon Moore was an American politician who served as a member of the Illinois House of Representatives. He served as a state representative representing St. Clair County in the 1st Illinois General Assembly, the 2nd Illinois General Assembly, the 3rd Illinois General Assembly, and the 4th Illinois General Assembly. He was fervently anti-slavery. He defeated his pro-slavery cousin, Risdon Moore Jr. in the general election for state representative to the 4th Illinois General Assembly.
