= Samuel Crozier =

American politician from Illinois of the early 19th century

Member of the Illinois Senate
- In office 1820–1824

Samuel Crozier was an American politician who served as a member of the Illinois Senate. He served as a state senator representing Randolph County in the 2nd and 3rd Illinois General Assemblies.
