= Edward Abend =

American politician

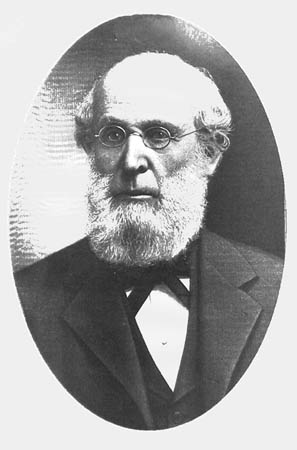

Member of the Illinois House of Representatives from the 19th district
- In office 1848 – 1850

Personal details
- Born: May 30, 1822 Marnheim, Bavaria, Germany
- Died: July 17, 1904 (aged 82)
- Party: Democratic
- Profession: Banker and attorney

Edward Abend (May 30, 1822 – July 17, 1904) was a German American politician, lawyer, and banker from the Kingdom of Bavaria. He came with his family to St. Louis, Missouri as a child, later moving to Belleville, Illinois. After studying at Lebanon College, Abend became a lawyer, eventually opening a practice in Belleville. Abend was active in the affairs of the city and county and was elected mayor four times. He served one term in the Illinois House of Representatives as a Free Soil Democrat.

== Biography ==
Edward Abend was born in Marnheim, Kingdom of Bavaria, on May 30, 1822. His family emigrated to the United States, settling in St. Louis, Missouri. After a cholera outbreak killed his father, brother, and sister, Abend's family moved to Belleville, Illinois. Abend attended public schools in St. Louis, but attended a private academy in Belleville. He was admitted to Lebanon College in 1840. He was admitted to the bar in 1843 and practiced in Lebanon, Illinois for two years. In 1844, he purchased a farm and operated it for six years. He then returned to Belleville to again practice law.

Abend was elected to the Illinois House of Representatives in 1848, serving one term. He was affiliated with the Free Soil Party and the Democratic Party. He maintained his affiliation with the Democrats, but often voted for Republican presidential candidates. He served as mayor of Belleville five times. He also served a term on the St. Clair County Board of Supervisors.

In 1860, Abend founded the Belleville Savings Bank and was named its first president. He also became president of the Electric Light Company of Belleville. He was the manager and president of the St. Clair Turnpike Company, which built a road in 1850 that was later sold to an electric railroad company. He was a director of the St. Louis, Alton and Terre Haute Railroad for twenty years.

Abend married Caroline Westermann in 1852. They had one daughter, Louisa, who died young. He remarried to Anna Hilgard in 1856. They had six children. He enjoyed traveling in his spare time and twice visited Europe. He died on July 17, 1904.
