= Georgia National Guard =

Component of the U.S. National Guard of the state of Georgia

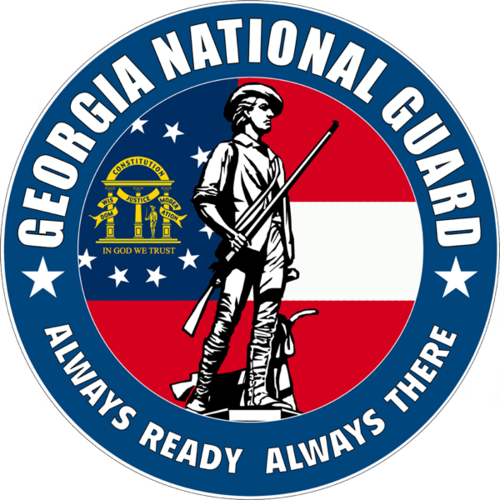
- Seal of the Georgia National Guard
- Country: United States
- Allegiance: Georgia
- Branch: United States Army; U.S. Air Force
- Type: military reserve force, Organized militia
- Role: "To meet state and federal mission responsibilities."
- Part of: National Guard Bureau; National Guard; Georgia Department of Defense
- Website: ga.ng.mil

Commanders
- Commander in Chief (Title 10 USC): President of the United States (when federalized)
- Commander in Chief (Title 32 USC): Governor of Georgia
- Adjutant General: MG Richard D. Wilson
- Assistant Adjutant General - Army: BG Jason Fryman
- Assistant Adjutant General - Air: MG Konata "Deuce" Crumbly
- State Senior Enlisted Advisor: CSM Clint Cowser

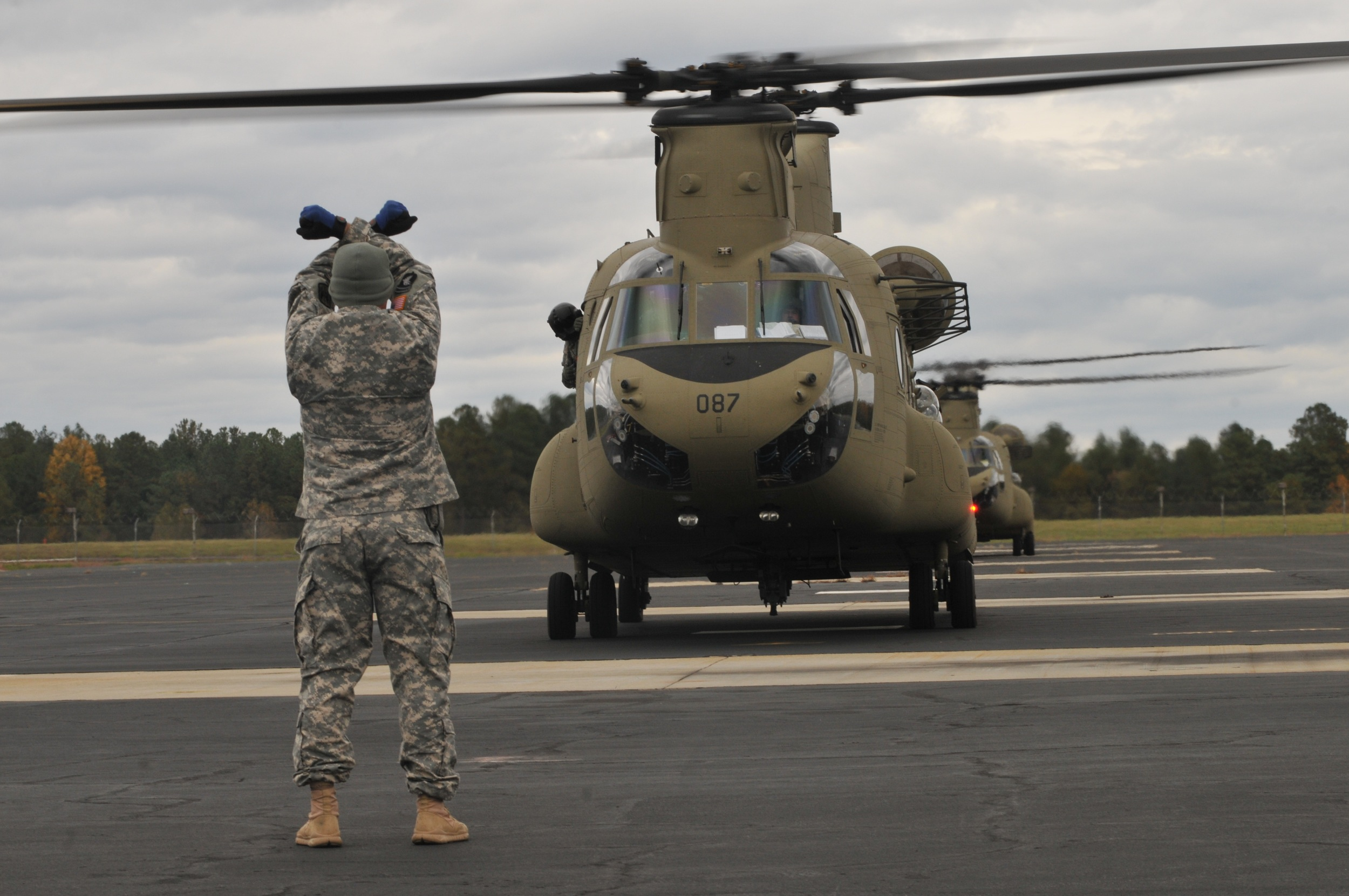
A joint operation between the Alabama and Georgia National Guard

The Georgia National Guard is the National Guard of the U.S. state of Georgia, and consists of the Georgia Army National Guard and the Georgia Air National Guard. (The Georgia State Defense Force is the third military unit of the Georgia Department of Defense, part of the government of Georgia.) The Constitution of the United States specifically charges the National Guard with dual federal and state missions. The state functions range from limited actions during non-emergency situations to full scale law enforcement of martial law when local law enforcement officials can no longer maintain civil control.

The National Guard may be called into federal service by the president under either Title 10 or Title 32 status. When National Guard troops are called to federal service, the president serves as commander-in-chief. The federal mission assigned to the National Guard is: "To provide properly trained and equipped units for prompt mobilization for war, National emergency or as otherwise needed."

The governor may call individuals or units of the Georgia National Guard into state service during emergencies or to assist in special situations which lend themselves to use of the National Guard. The state mission assigned to the National Guard is: "To provide trained and disciplined forces for domestic emergencies or as otherwise provided by state law."

As authorized under the Constitution, Congress has the power to regulate National Guard units; hence they are trained and equipped as a part of the United States Army, even when under state command. The same ranks and insignia are used and National Guardsmen are eligible to receive all United States military awards. All Georgia National Guard soldiers are also eligible for a number of state awards for local services rendered in or to the state of Georgia.

Georgia also maintains its own State Defense Force. This force is separate from the National Guard and reports to the governor of Georgia as Commander-in-Chief. The GSDF services the state exclusively, especially when the National Guard is deployed and unavailable.

The Georgia National Guard has a State Partnership Program relationship with the Georgian Defence Forces since 1994 (Georgia–Georgia National Guard Partnership), and Argentina since 2016.

In 2021, in response to a massive spike in COVID-19 cases, more than 100 National Guard personnel were deployed to 20 hospitals across Georgia.

== Georgia Army National Guard units ==
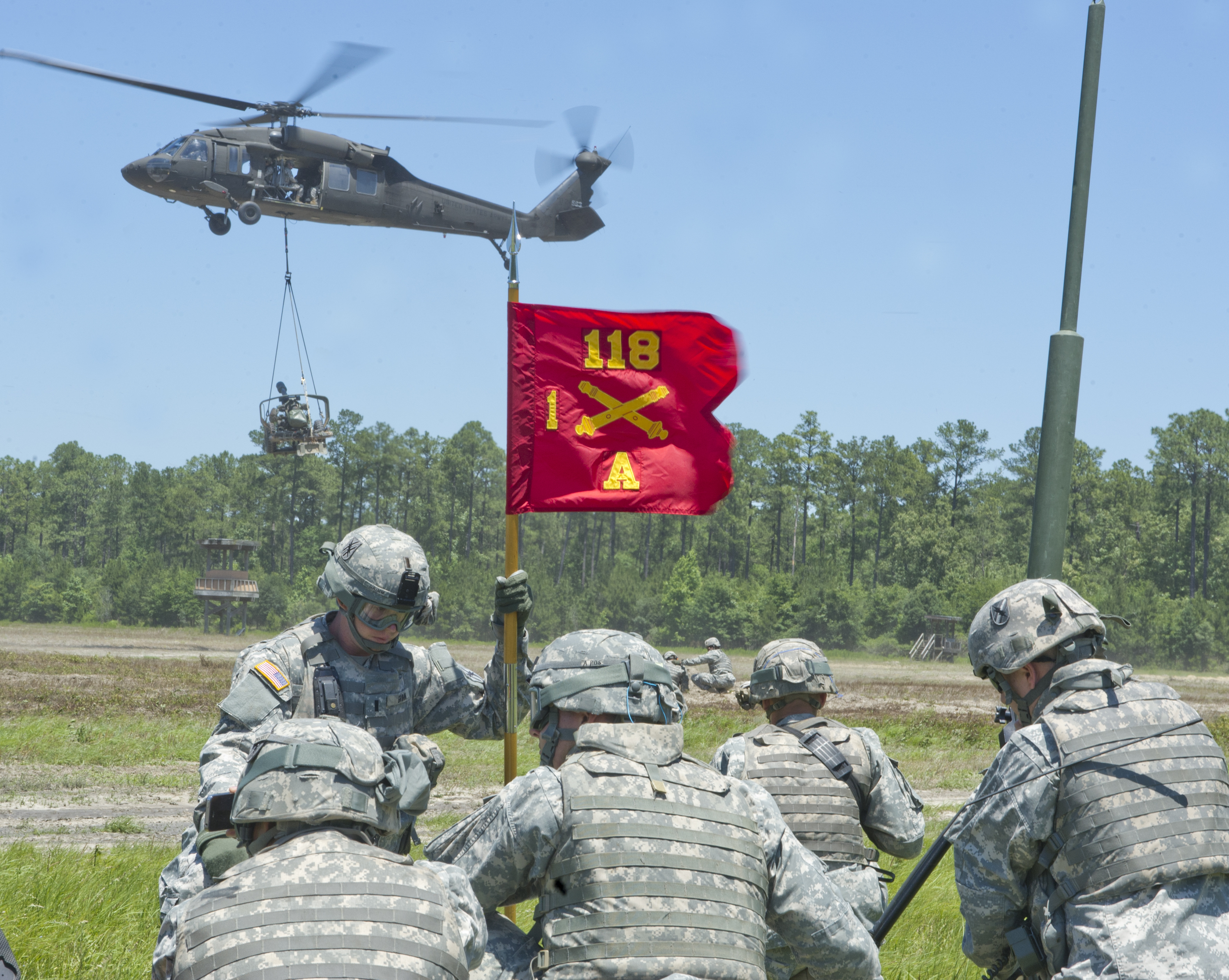
Annual training of the 118th Field Artillery Regiment.

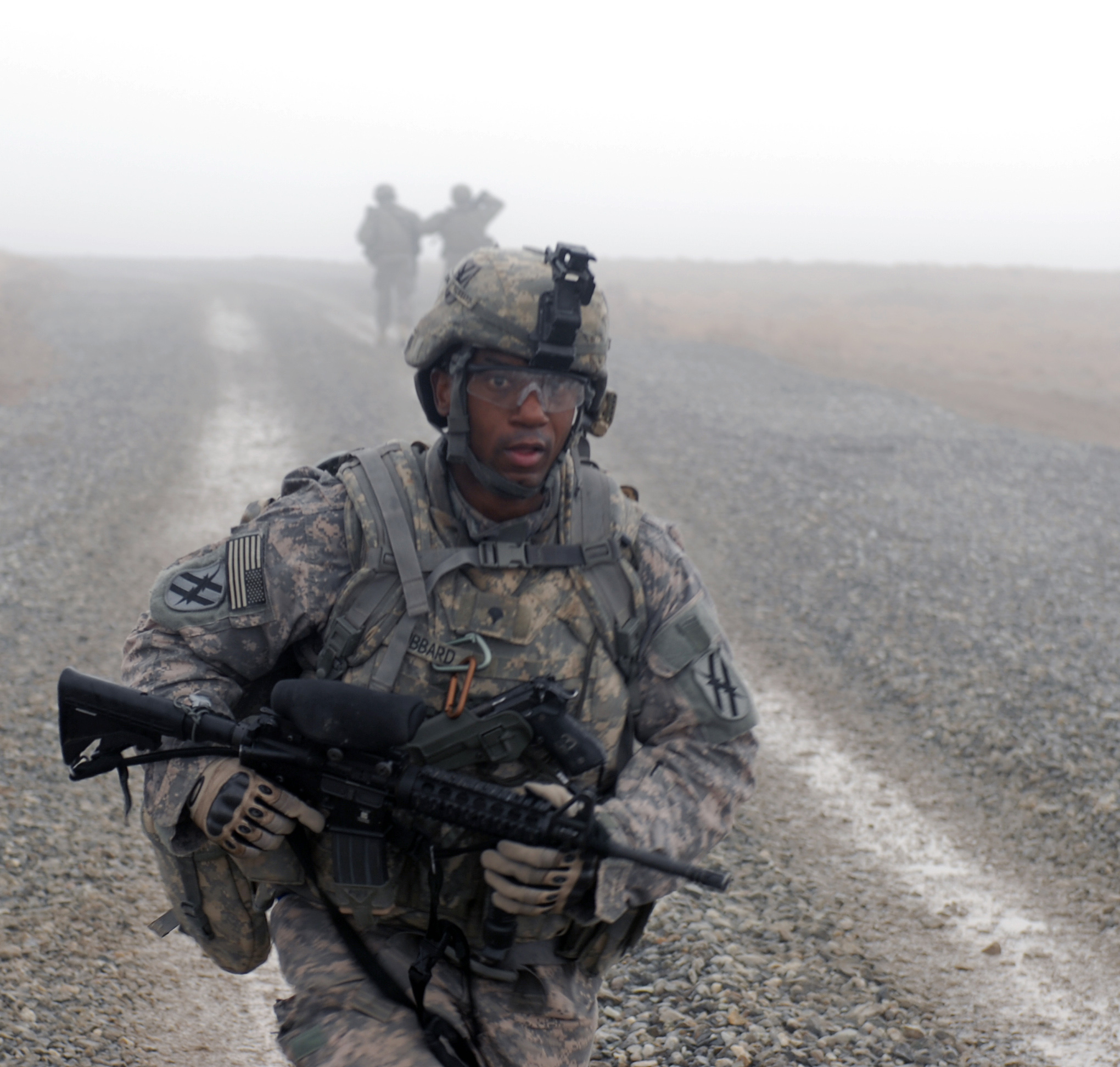
48th Georgia Army National Guard Soldier of the Year Competition

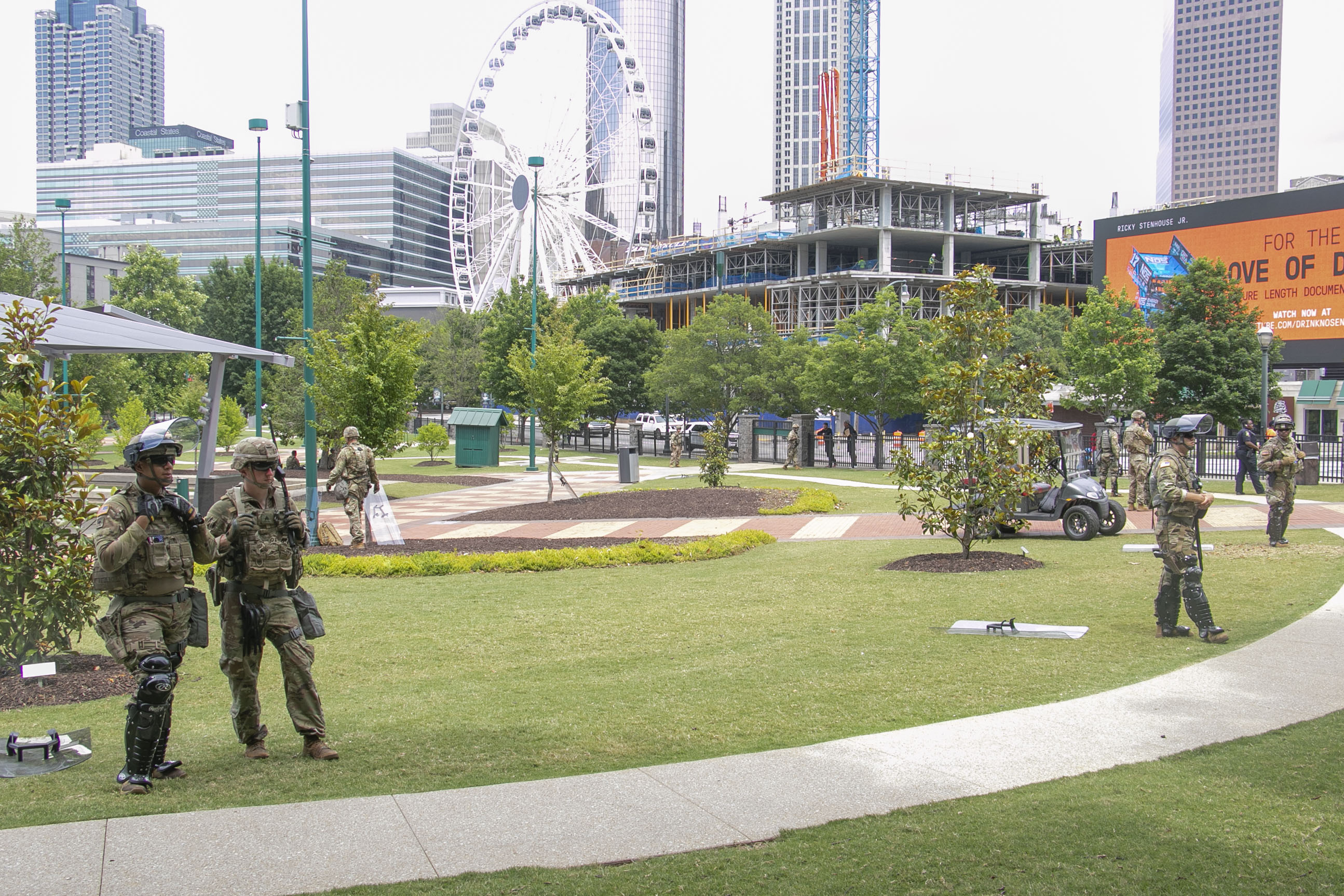
3rd Battalion, 121st Infantry Regiment guardsmen secure Centennial Olympic Park during Operation Defender Cyprus, the Georgia National Guard's security mission in Atlanta during mass protests in June 2020.

== Air units ==
- 165th Airlift Wing
- 116th Air Control Wing
- 117th Air Control Squadron
- 165th Air Support Operations Squadron
- 224th Joint Communications Support Squadron
- 283rd Combat Communications Squadron
- 139th Intelligence Squadron
- 202nd Engineering Installation Squadron
- 530th Air Force Band
- Combat Readiness Training Center

== Georgia's adjutant general lineage ==
The adjutant general is the senior military officer and de facto commander of the Georgia National Guard. Also known as TAG, they are subordinated to the governor, the chief executive. As of 2010 there had been 36 adjutants general in Georgia; the position had changed hands 42 times.

Rank	Name	Appointment	Date of Relief
Lieutenant Colonel	Augustus C. G. Elholm	Dec. 19, 1792	Jul. 15, 1795
Lt. Col.	Jonas Fauche	Feb. 20, 1796	Nov. 2, 1806
Lt. Col.	Daniel Newnan	Dec. 13, 1806	Nov. 10, 1817
Lt. Col.	John C. Easter	Nov. 13, 1817	Nov. 11, 1835
Col.	Daniel Newnan	Jan. 2, 1837	Dec. 25, 1837
Brig. Gen.	Daniel Newnan	Dec. 25, 1837	Dec. 22, 1840
Major General	Henry C. Wayne	Dec. 12, 1860	May 10, 1865
Colonel	John. B. Baird	Oct. 16, 1879	Nov. 5, 1882
Colonel	Jon S. Stephens	Nov. 6, 1882	Dec. 31, 1886
Brigadier General	John M. Kell	Jan. 1, 1887	Oct. 5, 1890
Brigadier General	Phil G. Byrd	Oct. 11, 1890	Nov. 11, 1890
Brigadier General	James W. Robertson	Nov. 12, 1890	Nov. 30, 1903
Brigadier General	Sampson W. Harris	Dec. 1, 1903	July 1, 1907
Brigadier General	Andrew J. Scott	July 2, 1907	July 1, 1911
Brigadier General	William G. Obear	Aug. 7, 1911	Dec. 31, 1912
Brigadier General	J. Van Holt Nash	Jan. 1, 1913	Aug. 26, 1917
Major	Arthur McCollum	Dec. 4, 1917	March 1, 1919
Brigadier General	J. Van Holt Nash	March 1, 1919	Oct. 22, 1922
Brigadier General	Lewis C. Pope	Oct. 28, 1922	June 30, 1923
Brigadier General	Charles M. Cox	July 2, 1923	June 27, 1927
Brigadier General	Homer C. Parker	June 28, 1927	June 30, 1932
Brigadier General	Charles M. Cox	July 1, 1932	Jan. 8, 1933
Brigadier General	Lindley W. Camp	Jan. 11, 1933	Jan. 12, 1937
Brigadier General	John E. Stoddard	Jan. 12, 1937	Sept. 30, 1940
Brigadier General	Marion Williamson	Oct. 1, 1940	Jan. 14, 1941
Brigadier General	Sion B. Hawkins	Jan. 14, 1941	Jan. 12, 1943
Brigadier General	Clark Howell	Jan. 12, 1943	Sept. 28, 1944
Brigadier General	Marvin Griffin	Sept. 28, 1944	March 22, 1947
Brigadier General	Alpha A. Fowler, Jr.	March 22, 1947	Nov. 16, 1948
Brigadier General	Ernest Vandiver	Nov. 17, 1948	June 20, 1954
Major General	George J. Hearn	June 21, 1954	July 9, 1957
Major General	Charlie F. Camp	July 10, 1957	Jan. 12, 1959
Major General	George J. Hearn	Jan. 13, 1959	Jan. 11, 1971
Major General	Ernest Vandiver	Jan 12, 1971	Nov. 1, 1971
Major General	Joel B. Paris III	Nov. 2, 1971	Jan. 13, 1975
Major General	Billy M. Jones	Jan. 14, 1975	Oct. 31, 1983
Major General	Joseph W. Griffin	Nov. 1, 1983	Jan. 14, 1991
Colonel	Jerry D. Sanders	Jan. 15, 1991	March 15, 1991
Major General	William P. Bland	April 1, 1991	Jan. 31, 1999
Lieutenant General	David B. Poythress	July 1, 1999	Oct. 28, 2007
Major General	William T. Nesbitt	Oct. 28, 2007	Sep. 30, 2011
Major General	James B. Butterworth	Sep. 30, 2011	Jan. 8, 2015
Major General	Joseph F. Jarrard	Jan. 8, 2015	Jan. 26, 2019
Major General	Thomas M. Carden Jr.	Jan. 26, 2019	May 4, 2024
Major General	Richard D. Wilson	May 4, 2024	
