= Georgia Department of Defense =

State agency in the US state of Georgia

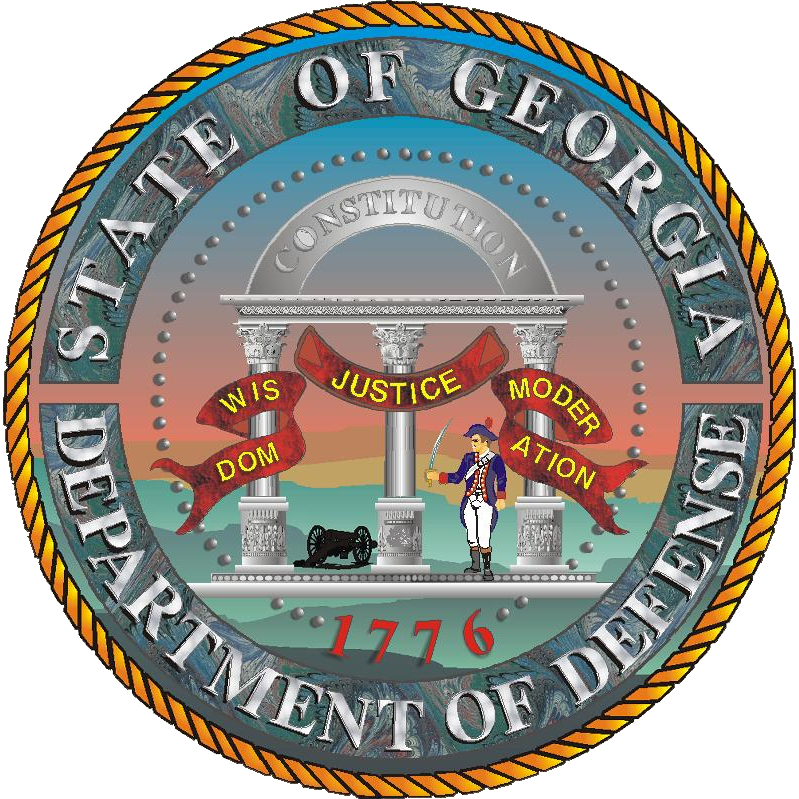

Agency overview
- Headquarters: Clay National Guard Center, Marietta, Georgia
- Employees: 11,124 Army Guardsmen; 2,812 Air Guardsmen; 760 SDF Soldiers; 563 State Employees
- Agency executives: Brian Kemp, Governor; Major General Richard D. Wilson, Adjutant General

The Georgia Department of Defense is a state agency charged with coordinating and supervising all agencies and functions of the Georgia National Guard. Headquartered at Clay National Guard Center in Marietta, Georgia, the Georgia Department of Defense includes the Georgia Army National Guard, the Georgia Air National Guard, and the Georgia State Defense Force.

The Georgia Department of Defense provides ready and relevant military forces to the Combatant Commanders, and with the consent of the Governor provides command and control and capabilities to support Homeland Defense and Defense Support of Civil Authorities.

== Organization ==
The Georgia Department of Defense employs over 11,100 Army National Guard soldiers, 2,800 Air National Guard airmen, 760 State Defense Force members, and 563 state employees. It oversees the Georgia National Guard as part of the total force policy and trains its units to fight and to win on battlefields with modern technology and weaponry.

=== Georgia Army National Guard ===
The Georgia Army National Guard consists of more than 11,100 citizen-soldiers training in more than 79 hometown armories and regional facilities across the state. Georgia’s Army Guard is the 8th largest in the nation and includes combat, combat support and combat service support units. The Georgia Army National Guard is organized into five major subordinate commands: the 48th Infantry Brigade Combat Team of Macon; the 78th Homeland Response Force at Clay National Guard Center in Marietta; the 78th Aviation Troop Command also at Clay; the 560th Battlefield Surveillance Brigade at Fort Gillem; and the 648th Maneuver Enhancement Brigade in Columbus at Fort Benning.

In 2009, the Georgia Army National Guard deployed more than 3,200 soldiers in support of Operation Iraqi Freedom and Operation Enduring Freedom. Since September 11, 2001, more than 12,000 citizen-soldiers from every deployable line unit in the Georgia Army National Guard have seen federal service in support of Overseas Contingency Operations, often with multiple rotations.

=== Georgia Air National Guard ===
The Georgia Air National Guard is the air force militia of the state of Georgia. It is, along with the Georgia Army National Guard, an element of the Georgia National Guard. It is also considered a part of the United States Air Force. It has 3,000 airmen and officers assigned to the two flying wings and seven geographically separated units (GSUs) throughout Georgia, including the 165th Airlift Wing at Savannah International Airport; the 116th Air Control Wing at Robins Air Force Base; the 117th Air Control Squadron of Savannah; the 165th Air Support Operations Squadron of Brunswick, Georgia; the 224th Joint Communications Support Squadron also of Brunswick; the 283rd Combat Communications Squadron at Dobbins Air Force Base in Marietta; the 139th Intelligence Squadron at Fort Gordon; the 202nd Engineering Installation Squadron of Macon; and the 530th Air Force Band at Dobbins Air Force Base in Marietta.

All units of the Georgia Air National Guard play an active role in supporting Georgia's homeland defense posture, providing airlift, engineering and communications resources and abilities. Air Guard personnel train regularly with the Georgia Army Guard's 78th Homeland Response Force and have responsibilities with Georgia's 4th Civil Support Team, as well as the Chemical, Biological, Radiological/Nuclear, and Explosive (CBRNE)- Enhanced Response Force Package (CERFP) organization.

=== Georgia State Defense Force ===
The Georgia State Defense Force is a volunteer military unit of the Georgia Department of Defense, serving in support of the national and state constitutions under direction of the governor and the adjutant general of Georgia. Members of the Georgia State Defense Force serve alongside the Georgia Army National Guard and the Georgia Air National Guard.

The GSDF's members help support and augment the Georgia National Guard, provide professional skills to the Georgia Department of Defense, and assist Georgia communities. Volunteers are trained to assist the National Guard, provide search and rescue, medical support, and disaster relief. In 2018, the GSDF established the OPFOR Battalion. The purpose of this unit is to provide Opposing Force training to National Guard units that are preparing to deploy.

== Programs and missions ==
=== Defense Support Civil Authorities ===
It is a primary mission of the Georgia National Guard to stand by to assist the state or nation in matters of homeland security or natural disasters. This includes anything from fighting wild fires, helping with oil spills, helping flood victims, and assisting with riot control. The Guard has also been fighting drug violence throughout the state of Georgia, with the Georgia Department of Defense having an entire unit dedicated to Counter-drug efforts. In 2009, the Counterdrug Task Force supported more than 450 missions, which resulted in seizures of illegal narcotics with a street value of more than $251.7 million.

The Joint Staff, through the JFHQ, provides a community-based response force that offers support in defense of the state, region, and country. the Joint Staff enhances mission performance and strengthens the care provided to Georgia Department of Defense members and their families by leveraging community presence, employer support, and family care programs.

Under the JFHQ umbrella, the Georgia Department of Defense maintains liaison with the Georgia Office of Homeland Security and the Georgia Emergency Management Agency, along with key emergency and law enforcement officials across the state.

The Guard's Quick Reaction Force (QRF) provides force protection and security for WMD Civil Support Teams and CBRNE Enhanced Response Force Package Teams. The QRF comprises 132 personnel who are capable of responding within eight hours, and 500 personnel who can respond within 24 hours.

=== Youth ChalleNGe Academy ===
The Georgia National Guard runs the state and federally funded Youth ChalleNGe Academy (YCA) program. The stated purpose of the Youth ChalleNGe Academy is to provide "at-risk" youth with academic and life skills training aimed at improving employment potential and creating productive citizens. Each young person that enrolls is matched with a qualified mentor who follows the student during the residential phase and then formally assists and monitors their success during the 12 months following graduation.

The Georgia Department of Defense orchestrates two campuses; one in the Brems Barracks on Fort Gordon, near Augusta, and one at Fort Stewart near Savannah. A third campus in Milledgeville was closed in 2020. They service students from around Georgia and accept applications year round. Classes begin four times each year (two at each campus), and are continuous for 5 1/2 months. Following the residential phase of the program, the students must complete the 12 month post-residential phase in order to successfully complete the Youth ChalleNGe Program. The Fort Gordon Youth ChalleNGe Academy graduates approximately 425 students each year.

Students completing the program successfully can be awarded two separate diplomas: first, the Youth ChalleNGe Academy Diploma, and second, either the General Equivalency Diploma or the State of Georgia high school diploma.

=== STARBASE ===
The Georgia Department of Defense's Science and Technology Academies Reinforcing Basic Aviation and Space Education (STARBASE) program seeks to build interest in science, technology, engineering and math amongst Georgia's at-risk youth. The program exposes students and their teachers to real-world applications of math and science, through experiential learning, simulations and experiments in aviation and space-related fields.

Georgia's STARBASE serves approximately 800 fifth graders annually, with quantifiable improvement. Before participation in the program, students averaged 53% on a standardized science, technology, and math test. After participating in Georgia's STARBASE, average student scores improved by over 20 percentage points to 76.9%.

At STARBASE, students interact with military personnel to explore careers and make connections with the real world. The program provides students with 20–25 hours of experience, exposing youth to the technological environments found within the Georgia National Guard.

== Financial impact ==
Georgia continues to support its Department of Defense's growth, with the new $26 million Cumming regional armory and the $16 million Lorenzo-Benn facility.

The Cumming armory is the first new armory in Georgia in many years. The Georgia Department of Defense also acquired Clay National Guard Center from the Navy, where a new $30 million JFHQ building is under construction, the Fort Benning joint use armory, AASF 2 being renovated to house its parachute rigger company, and a new Language Lab. There has been $300 million in renovation and construction over the last ten years, after seeing virtually none over the course of the previous forty.

The state’s investments in its national guard has had a significant positive impact on the State's economy. Because most of the organization’s funds come from federal sources, Georgia actually sees more tax revenue from the income of its citizen-soldiers than it spends on the Georgia Guard as a whole. The Georgia National Guard is provided about $10 million in state funding annually.

== List of Adjutant Generals ==
The Adjutant General is the senior military officer and de facto commander of the Georgia National Guard. Also known as TAG, they are subordinated to the Governor, the Chief Executive. As of today, there have been 37 Adjutant Generals in Georgia and the position has changed hands 42 times.

Rank	Name	Appointment	Date of Relief
Lt. Col.	Augustus C. G. Elholm	Dec. 19, 1792	Jul. 15, 1795
Lt. Col.	Jonas Fauche	Feb. 20, 1796	Nov. 2, 1806
Lt. Col.	Daniel Newnan	Dec. 13, 1806	Nov. 10, 1817
Lt. Col.	John C. Easter	Nov. 13, 1817	Nov. 11, 1835
Col.	Daniel Newnan	Jan. 2, 1837	Dec. 25, 1837
Brig. Gen.	Daniel Newnan	Dec. 25, 1837	Dec. 22, 1840
Maj. Gen.	Henry C. Wayne	Dec. 12, 1860	May 10, 1865
Col.	John. B. Baird	Oct. 16, 1879	Nov. 5, 1882
Col.	Jon S. Stephens	Nov. 6, 1882	Dec. 31, 1886
Brig. Gen.	John M. Kell	Jan. 1, 1887	Oct. 5, 1890
Brig. Gen.	Phil G. Byrd	Oct. 11, 1890	Nov. 11, 1890
Brig. Gen.	James W. Robertson	Nov. 12, 1890	Nov. 30, 1903
Brig. Gen.	Sampson W. Harris	Dec. 1, 1903	July 1, 1907
Brig. Gen.	Andrew J. Scott	July 2, 1907	July 1, 1911
Brig. Gen.	William G. Obear	Aug. 7, 1911	Dec. 31, 1912
Brig. Gen.	J. Van Holt Nash	Jan. 1, 1913	Aug. 26, 1917
Maj.	Arthur McCollum	Dec. 4, 1917	March 1, 1919
Brig. Gen.	J. Van Holt Nash	March 1, 1919	Oct. 22, 1922
Brig. Gen.	Lewis C. Pope	Oct. 28, 1922	June 30, 1923
Brig. Gen.	Charles M. Cox	July 2, 1923	June 27, 1927
Brig. Gen.	Homer C. Parker	June 28, 1927	June 30, 1932
Brig. Gen.	Charles M. Cox	July 1, 1932	Jan. 8, 1933
Brig. Gen.	Lindley W. Camp	Jan. 11, 1933	Jan. 12, 1937
Brig. Gen.	John E. Stoddard	Jan. 12, 1937	Sept. 30, 1940
Brig. Gen.	Marion Williamson	Oct. 1, 1940	Jan. 14, 1941
Brig. Gen.	Sion B. Hawkins	Jan. 14, 1941	Jan. 12, 1943
Brig. Gen.	Clark Howell	Jan. 12, 1943	Sept. 28, 1944
Brig. Gen.	Samuel M. Griffin	Sept. 28, 1944	March 22, 1947
Brig Gen.	Alpha A. Fowler Jr.	March 22, 1947	Nov. 16, 1948
Brig. Gen.	Ernest Vandiver	Nov. 17, 1948	June 20, 1954
Maj. Gen.	George J. Hearn	June 21, 1954	July 9, 1957
Maj. Gen.	Charlie F. Camp	July 10, 1957	Jan. 12, 1959
Maj. Gen.	George J. Hearn	Jan. 13, 1959	Jan. 11, 1971
Maj. Gen.	Ernest Vandiver	Jan 12, 1971	Nov. 1, 1971
Maj. Gen.	Joel B. Paris III	Nov. 2, 1971	Jan. 13, 1975
Maj. Gen.	Billy M. Jones	Jan. 14, 1975	Oct. 31, 1983
Maj. Gen.	Joseph W. Griffin	Nov. 1, 1983	Jan. 14, 1991
Col.	Jerry D. Sanders	Jan. 15, 1991	March 15, 1991
Maj. Gen.	William P. Bland	April 1, 1991	Jan. 31, 1999
Lt. Gen.	David B. Poythress	July 1, 1999	Oct. 28, 2007
Maj. Gen.	William T. Nesbitt	Oct. 28, 2007	Sept. 30, 2011
Lt. Gen.	James B. Butterworth	Sep. 30, 2011	Jan. 8, 2015
Maj. Gen.	Joseph Jarrard	Jan. 8, 2015	Jan. 26, 2019
Maj. Gen.	Thomas M. Carden Jr.	Jan 26, 2019	May 4, 2024
Maj. Gen.	Richard D. Wilson	May 4, 2024	Present
