= Scott Hammond =

Scott Hammond may refer to:

- Scott Hammond (musician) (born 1973), English drummer
- Scott Hammond (politician) (born 1966), American politician in Nevada
- Scott Hammond (ice hockey), played in 1984 Memorial Cup
- Scott A. Hammond, American general

== See also ==
- Winfield Scott Hammond
