= 117 Squadron =

117 Squadron or 117th Squadron may refer to:

- 117 Squadron (Israel)
- No. 117 Squadron RCAF, Canada
- No. 117 Squadron RAF, United Kingdom
- 117th Air Control Squadron, United States Air Force
- 117th Air Refueling Squadron, United States Air Force
- VAW-117, United States Navy
- VPB-117, United States Navy
