= Department of defense (disambiguation) =

A department of defense or ministry of defence is the highest level of organization of a country's military.

Department of Defense may in particular refer to:

- Georgia Department of Defense, a department of the US state of Georgia
- United States Department of Defense
