= General Hammond =

General Hammond may refer to:

- Arthur Verney Hammond (1892–1982), British Indian Army major general
- Creed C. Hammond (1874–1940), U.S. Army major general
- Jeffery Hammond (born 1959), U.S. Army major general
- Scott A. Hammond (fl. 1980s–2000s), Georgia Air National Guard major general
- William A. Hammond (1828–1900), Union Army brigadier general

== Fictional characters ==
- George Hammond (Stargate), a fictional U.S. Air Force lieutenant general in Stargate media.
- General Hamilton Hartington Hammond, a fictional brigadier general in the novel MASH: A Novel About Three Army Doctors

== See also ==
- Attorney General Hammond (disambiguation)
