= Andrea Lewis (disambiguation) =

Andrea Lewis may refer to:

- Andrea Lewis (born 1985), Canadian actress and singer
- Andrea Lewis Miller, American academic administrator
- Andrea Lewis (pilot), American pilot
- Andrea Lewis Jarvis, lead singer of The Darling Buds
