= Attorney General Hammond =

Attorney General Hammond may refer to:

- Hall Hammond (1902–1991), Attorney General of Maryland
- Nathaniel Job Hammond (1833–1899), Attorney General of Georgia

== See also ==
- General Hammond (disambiguation)
