= Andrea Lewis (pilot) =

African American pilot

Andrea Lewis is the first African American female pilot of the Georgia Air National Guard.

Lewis first joined the Air Force as a reservist in 2010. In 2014, she was accepted into the 116th Air Control Wing. She is a E-8C pilot.

On March 5, 2021, Lewis was honored at the "Women in the Air Force" exhibit dedicated to showcasing the history of women and their contributions in the U.S. Air Force.
