= Scott A. Hammond =

United States Air Force general

Scott A. Hammond is a former major general and Commander and Chief of Staff of the Georgia Air National Guard.

== Career ==
Hammond graduated from the United States Air Force Academy in 1975 and began training at Williams Air Force Base. He later underwent further training at Williams and Randolph Air Force Base.

From 1980 to 1981, he was stationed at The Pentagon. Afterwards, he was assigned to the 34th Tactical Fighter Squadron at Holloman Air Force Base, the 550th Tactical Fighter Training Squadron at Luke Air Force Base, and the 33rd Tactical Fighter Wing of Tactical Air Command at Eglin Air Force Base.

In 1985, Hammond transferred to the Georgia Air National Guard and was assigned to the 116th Tactical Fighter Wing. The following year, he was reassigned to Tactical Air Command as an instructor pilot. Hammond returned to the 116th Tactical Fighter Wing in 1989 as Chief of Operations Training.

In 1992, Hammond assumed command of the 128th Fighter Squadron. He remained in the position until 1995 when he returned to what was by then the 116th Fighter Squadron. Additionally, he graduated from the Air War College.

Hammond later served as Operations Group Commander of the Georgia Air National Guard from 1996 to 1998. In 1998, he returned once again to what was then the 116th Bomb Wing as Vice Commander.

In 1999, Hammond became Director of Operations of the Georgia Air National Guard. He assumed command in 2001. After serving as Assistant Adjutant General from 2004 to 2009, he was named Chief of Staff.

Awards he received include the Meritorious Service Medal, the Air Force Commendation Medal, the Air Force Achievement Medal, the Joint Meritorious Unit Award, the Air Force Outstanding Unit Award, the Combat Readiness Medal, the National Defense Service Medal, the Global War on Terrorism Service Medal, the Humanitarian Service Medal, the Air Force Longevity Service Award, the Armed Forces Reserve Medal and the Air Force Training Ribbon.

As a civilian, Hammond would become a pilot in command with Delta Air Lines.
