= 201st Regional Support Group =

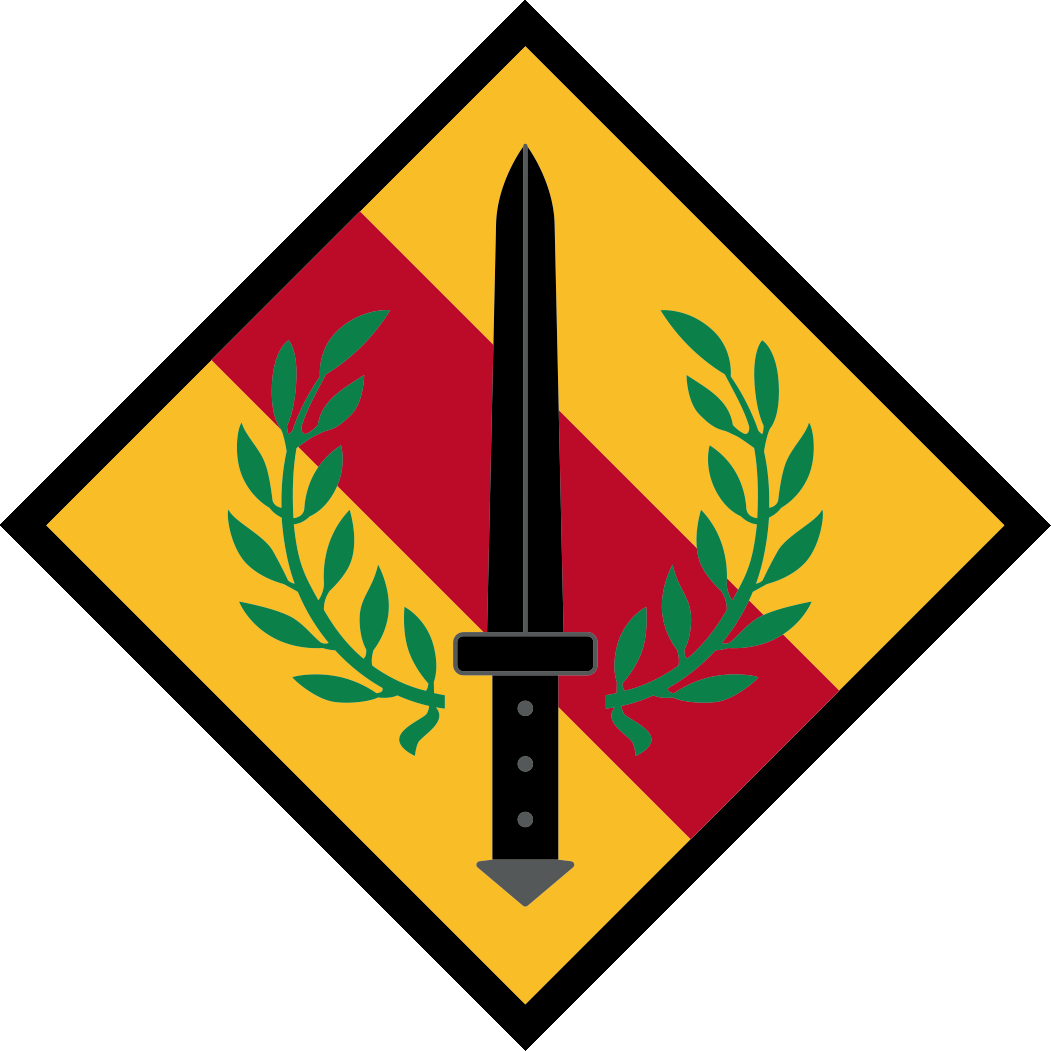
- 201st Support Group shoulder sleeve insignia
- Active: October 1, 2013 –
- Country: United States
- Branch: United States Army National Guard
- Type: WMD/Attack Consequence Management
- Size: More than 1500
- Part of: Georgia Army National Guard
- Garrison/HQ: Clay National Guard Center
- Motto: On call. We’re ready!
- Website: https://ga.ng.mil/Leadership/201st-Regional-Support-Group/

Commanders
- Current commander: Col. Copeland Rowell
- Current Command Sergeant Major: CSM Lafayette Deal
- Previous commander: COL Shane P. Strickland 2020-2022
- Previous commander: COL Alexander V. McLemore 2019-2020
- Previous commander: COL Michael B. Maddox 2017-2019
- Previous commander: COL Wallace E. Steinbrecher 2015-2017
- Previous commander: COL Vernon Atkinson 2013-2015

Insignia
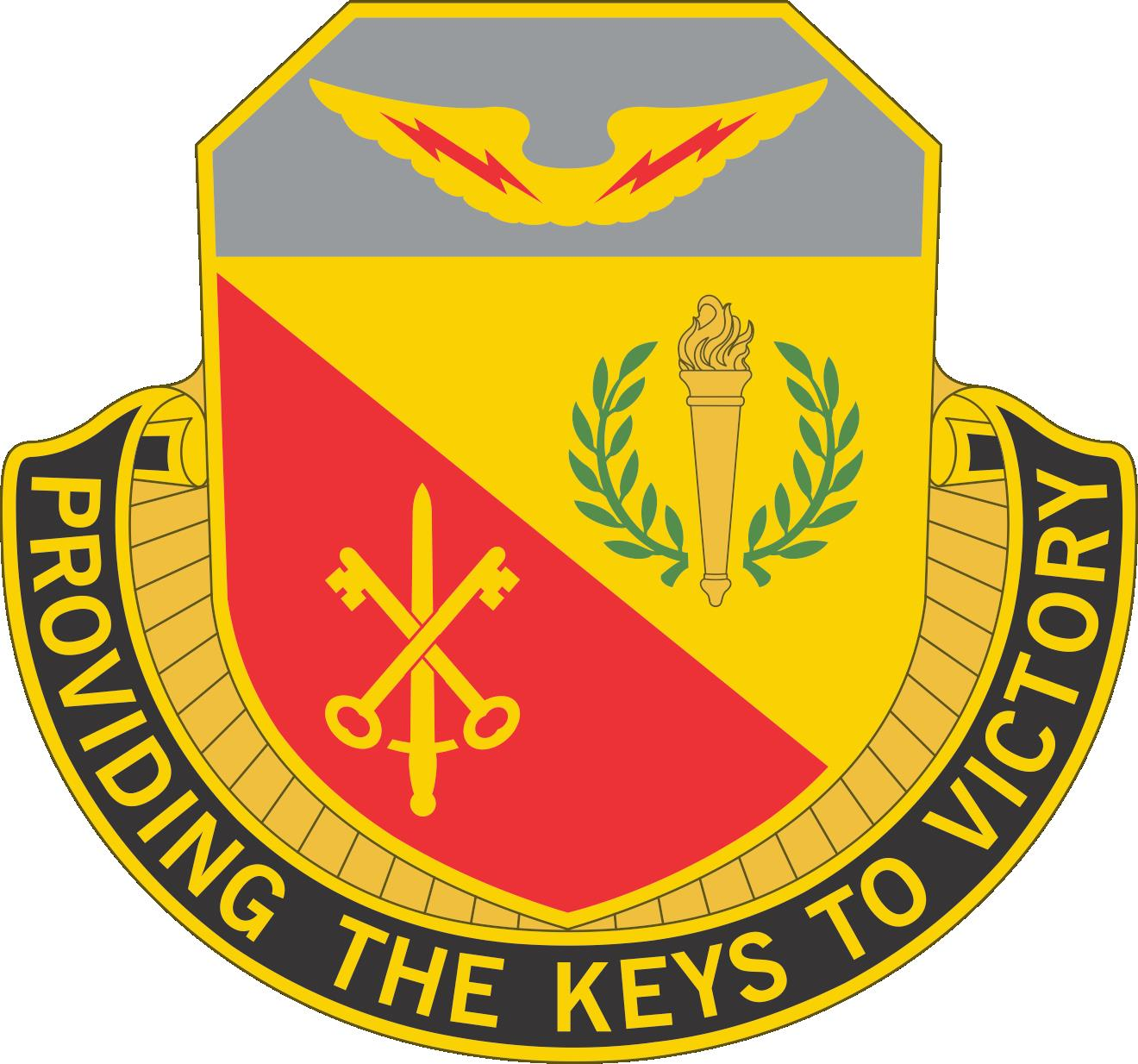
- 201st RSG DUI

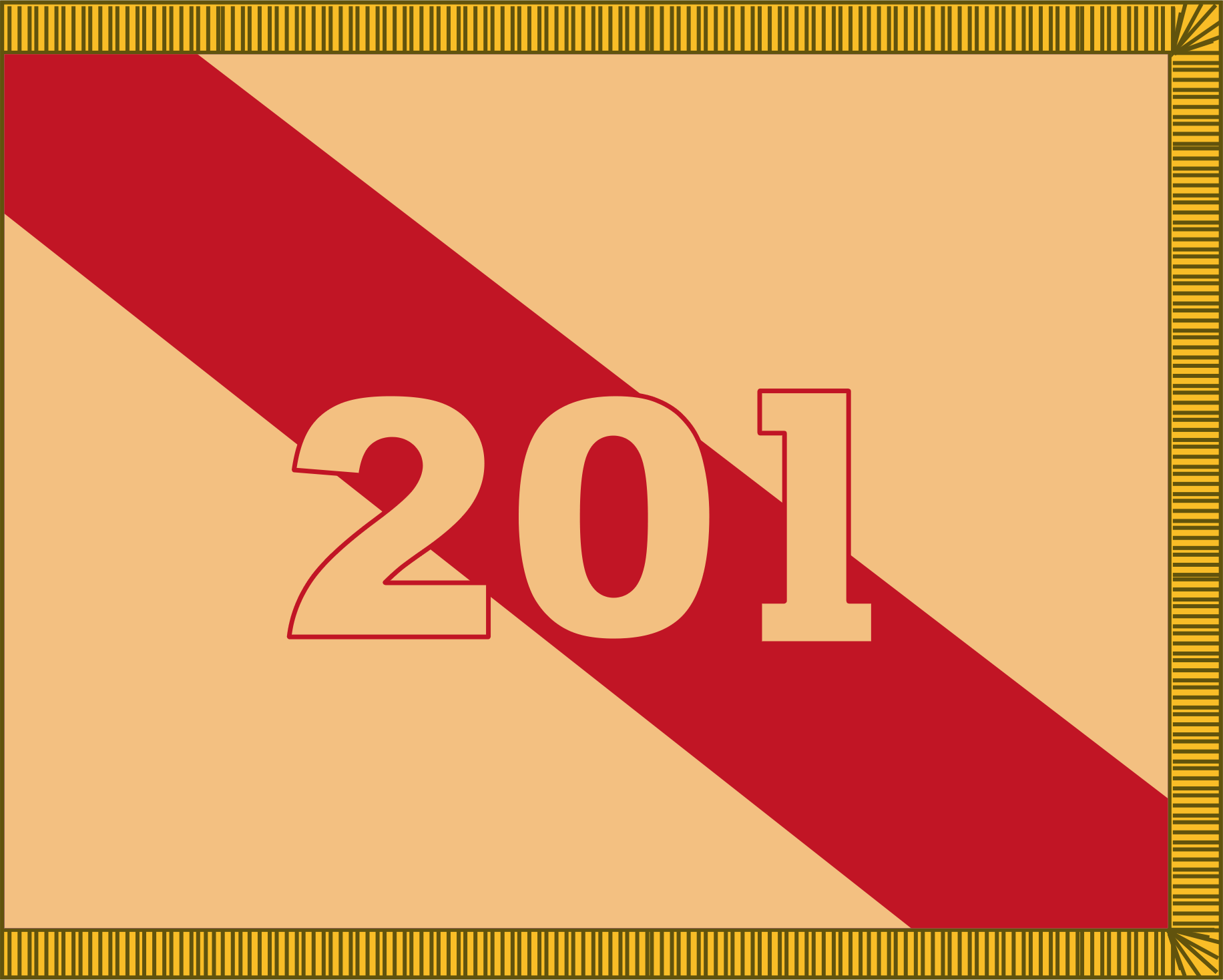
- 201st Regional Support Group Flag

The 201st Regional Support Group (201st RSG) is a regional support group of the United States Army and the Georgia Army National Guard.

The original 201st Quartermaster Battalion was established in 2004. It appears to have become the 201st RSG in 2006 or 2007.

In 2010, the 78th Troop Command was selected as one of ten regional homeland response forces in the nation. The 78th TC maintained the HRF mission until the establishment of the 201st Regional Support Group as a separate major command on October 1, 2013. It is formally designated the "'Region IV HRF / 201st RSG."'

Once home-stationed in Decatur, Georgia, it has, since Jan. 11, 2011, occupied parts of the former Naval Air Station Atlanta at what has become the Clay National Guard Center since late September 2009. Many of the Region IV HRF's units were relocated to barracks at Clay in the course of 2011.

== Mission ==
The Region IV HRF / 201st RSG mission is to man, train and equip a homeland response force that can provide a response capability to assist civil authorities in saving lives and mitigating suffering in response to a chemical, biological, radiological, nuclear, and explosives incident. At the same time, the 201st must provide trained and ready troops to support overseas contingency operations.

The HRFs are designed to foster a dialogue between regional first responders and other agencies. The Region IV HRF plays an important role at the regional level in terms of helping develop and build regional plans and in working with southeastern emergency managers to build a functioning and cohesive connective tissue at the regional level. One of the important concerns the HRF construction seeks to alleviate is the need to respond to multiple, simultaneous disasters. Through these HRFs, the Georgia Department of Defense has the federal capacity to command and control response to multiple disasters or emergencies throughout the nation, simultaneously.

== Deployments ==
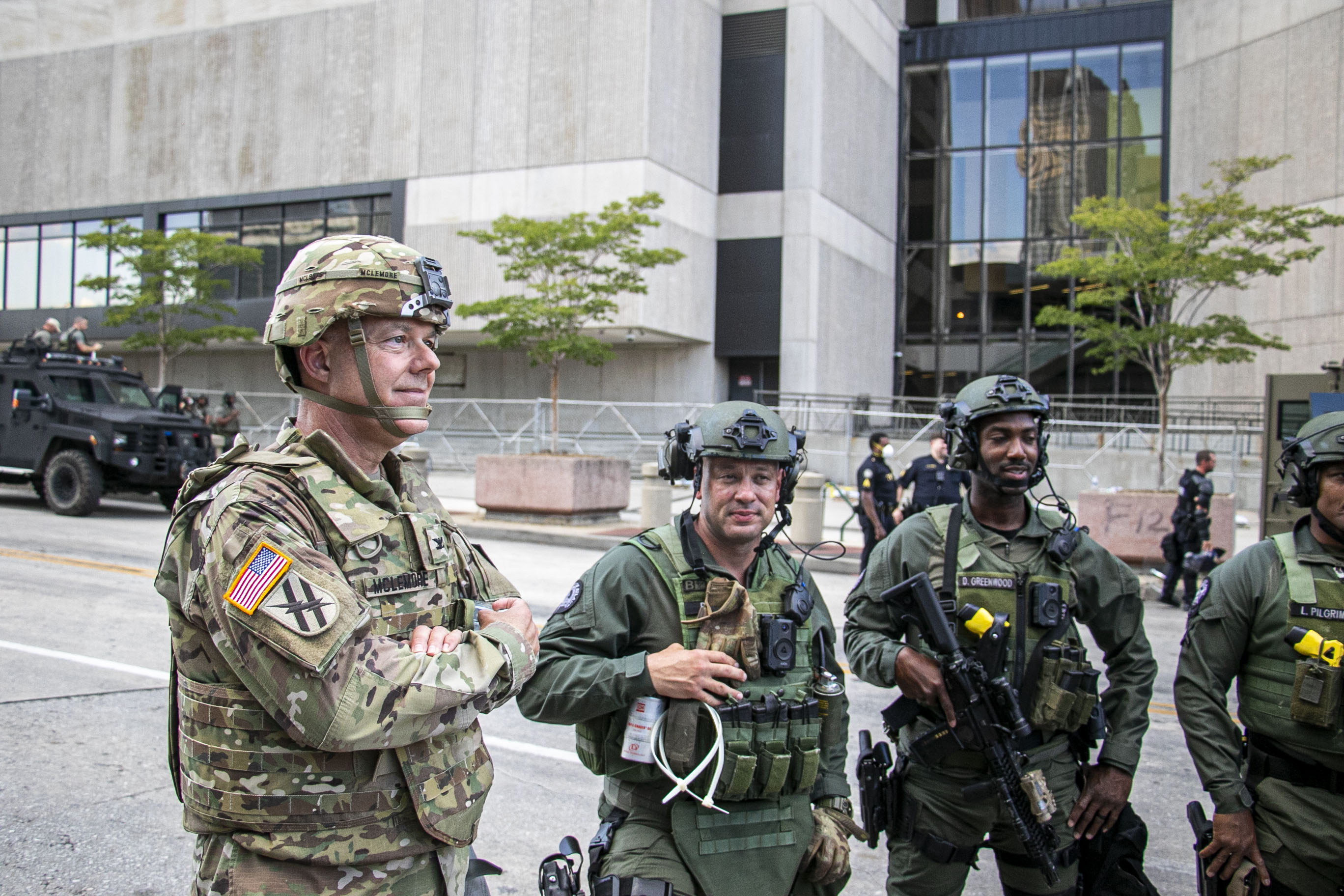
Colonel Alexander McLemore, 201st Regional Support Group brigade commander, talks to Atlanta Police Department SWAT during the George Floyd protests of 2020

Since the September 11 terrorist attacks in 2001, every unit assigned to the Region IV HRF has mobilized and deployed. They went to the Iraq War, the War in Afghanistan (2001-2021) and various military bases across the United States.

On February 8, 2009, the 110th Combat Sustainment Support Battalion prepared to deploy to Iraq for a year-long mission. While there, the 110th acted as higher headquarters for active, Guard and Reserve units, while also upgrading and repairing the equipment destined for return stateside as part of the draw-down of forces from Iraq.

In Spring 2011, the 201st Regional Support Group-Agriculture Development Team 1 deployed to Southeastern Afghanistan. It is the first of three such Georgia Teams that are part of the National Guard Program to help the Afghans improve their farming and agribusiness techniques, thereby enhancing the country's agricultural economy and steering Afghan farmers away from growing poppy, which is used for making heroin.

In July 2018, the Headquarters / Headquarters Company (HHC) of the 201st RSG deployed to Iraq for a 9 month deployment. The mission was to conduct Base Operations in three separate locations in Iraq. Each location had a Base Operational Support - Integrator (BOS-I) staff that managed daily base operations and security. In addition to the BOS-I mission, the Brigade Commander and the Senior Enlisted Advisor of the 201st RSG deployed to Iraq to serve as the base command team for Al Asad Air Base.

== Organization ==
- 201st Regional Support Group, at Clay National Guard Center
  - Headquarters and Headquarters Company, 201st Regional Support Group, at Clay National Guard Center
  - 170th Military Police Battalion, in Decatur
    - Headquarters and Headquarters Detachment, 170th Military Police Battalion, in Decatur
    - 178th Military Police Company, in Monroe
    - 179th Military Police Company, at Fort Stewart
  - 265th Chemical Battalion, in Marietta
    - Headquarters and Headquarters Company, in Marietta
    - 4th Civil Support Team (WMD), at Clay National Guard Center
    - 138th Chemical Company, at Clay National Guard Center
    - 202nd Ordnance Detachment (EOD), in Waynesboro
    - 248th Medical Company (Area Support), in Marietta
    - 810th Engineer Company (Combat Engineer Company — Infantry), in Swainsboro
    - 870th Engineer Detachment (Explosive Hazards Coordination Cell), at Clay National Guard Center
    - 1160th Transportation Company (Medium Truck) (PLS), in Rome
    - 1177th Transportation Company (Medium Truck) (Cargo), in Lagrange

== Other HRF locations ==
There are ten HRFs in the National Guard throughout the nation, one per FEMA region. This allows closer and more familiar correspondence with regional and civilian responders. As a result, the reaction time to disasters will be much faster due to geographical locations. The 10 HRF (one per FEMA region) Guard Forces will consist of 577 personnel and be composed of:

- C2 (brigade/battalion level)
- Security Force
- Search and Extraction
- Decon
- Medical
- Fatality Search and Recovery Team
