= 139th Intelligence Squadron =

- Active: 2008 – present
- Country: United States
- Branch: United States Air Force; Air National Guard
- Type: Air Unit
- Role: Intelligence
- Size: 44
- Garrison/HQ: Fort Gordon, Georgia
- Nickname(s): Guard Dogs

Commanders
- Current commander: Lt. Col. Kimberly Chatfield
- Detachment Commander: Lt. Col. Jeff L. Thetford

The 139th Intelligence Squadron (IS) is the newest unit of the Georgia Air National Guard, focusing on intelligence operations. The commander of the 44-member intelligence squadron is Lt. Col. Kimberly Chatfield, and the detachment commander is Lt. Col. Jeff L. Thetford, both former members of the 116th Air Control Wing. The unit will employ 37 traditional and seven full-time Guardsmen.

== History ==
The 139th Intelligence Squadron activated 15 Feb 2010 at Fort Gordon, Georgia, under the National Guard Bureau, and became federally recognized on 28 Apr 2010.

== Mission ==
The mission of the 139th Intelligence Squadron is the executing of cryptologic intelligence operations to satisfy strategic, operations and tactical intelligence requirements of national decision makers, combatant commanders and combat operations. The 139th IS enhances preexisting intelligence capabilities at Fort Gordon. As home of the U.S. Army Signal Corps, Fort Gordon is the largest communications electronics facility in the world. The Distributed Common Ground Systems for the Air Force also resides at Fort Gordon. In addition, it has an important state mission of providing a trained and equipped force to assist the citizens of Georgia in times of emergency.

== Emblem ==
Ultramarine blue and Air Force yellow are the Air Force colors. Blue alludes to the sky, the primary theater of Air Force operations. Yellow refers to the sun and the excellence required of Air Force personnel. The Cerberus symbolizes the three-fold nature of the unit’s National, Air Force and State intelligence missions. The gray ring represents the intellectually stimulating and changing nature of intelligence operations. The red key signifies that intelligence provides the key to Air Force operations.
