= 530th Air Force Band =

The 530th Air Force Band supports global Air Force and Air National Guard missions by fostering patriotism and providing musical services for the military community as well as the general public.

== History ==
Originally formed in 1946, the Air National Guard Band of the South was activated for federal service with the 116th Air Control Wing on 10 October 1950. The band was stationed in Alexandria, Louisiana until 1952, when it was released from active duty. In 1953, the Georgia Air National Guard reformed the band with Chief Warrant Officer John Love as Commander, a position he held until his retirement in 1960. Under his leadership, the band achieved recognition as the best Air National Guard band in the United States. Previously known as the 530th Air National Guard Band, the group was renamed Air National Guard Band of the South in 2002. One of eleven Air National Guard bands, the Band of the South provides music for military ceremonies, official protocol functions, and recruiting and retention events, and community relations.

Under the direction of Captain Alan B. McConnell, the Air National Guard Band of the South averages fifty performances a year, and performs regularly throughout its primary area of responsibility (Georgia, Alabama, Florida, North Carolina, and South Carolina) as "Goodwill Ambassadors" for the Georgia Air National Guard. Throughout the years, the band's reputation has led to requested performances in Mississippi, Louisiana, Tennessee, Wyoming, Montana, Indiana, Michigan, Delaware, the Azores Islands, Norway, and the Dominican Republic. The band has performed for many notable figures, including President Harry S. Truman and the President of Tanzania, honored generals from one star to four, and serenaded dignitaries from mayors and congressmen to governors and presidents.

Within the Air National Guard Band of the South are a concert band, ceremonial band, Eagle's Flight Jazz Ensemble, a rock/pop ensemble known as Sound Barrier, Space-A Rock Band, Brass Quintet, Woodwind Quintet, and High Flutin,' a flute ensemble. All members of the band are traditional guardsmen, and along with all other Army and Air National Guard units, serve one weekend a month, two weeks during the year and other times when called to duty.

== Functions ==
The 530th provides music for military ceremonies, official functions, recruiting and retention events and community relations. The band averages fifty performances a year and performs regularly throughout its area of responsibility as "Goodwill Ambassadors" for the Georgia Air National Guard. Members are typical guardsmen, serving one weekend a month, two weeks during the summer and at other times when called to duty.

The unit performs for audiences all over the world, although it primarily serves communities throughout Georgia, Alabama, Florida, North Carolina, and South Carolina.

The units last performance was 13 July 2013.
