= 224th Joint Communications Support Squadron =

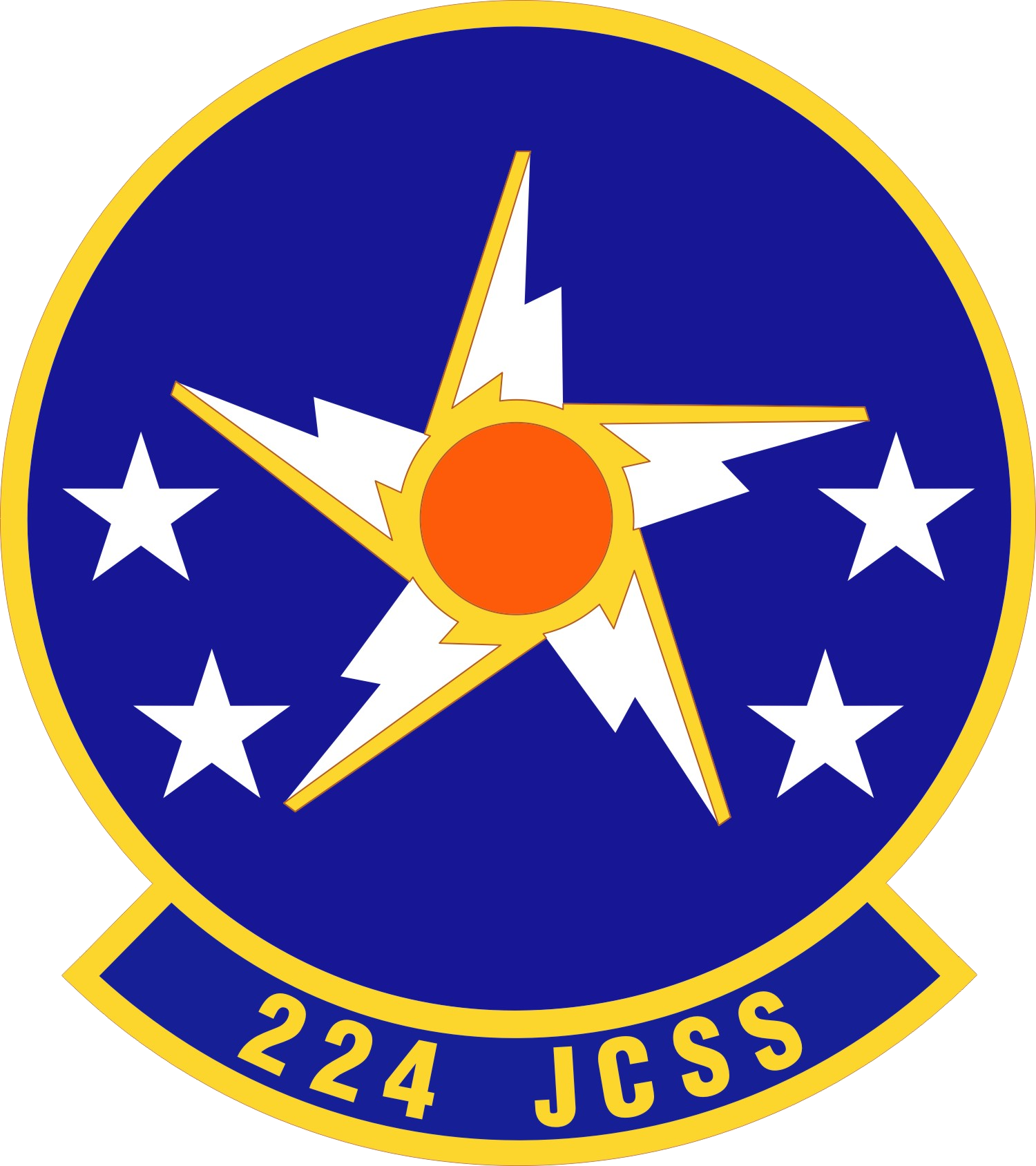
- 224th JCSS Emblem
- Active: 1 July 1952–present
- Country: United States
- Branch: United States Air Force; Georgia Air National Guard
- Role: Rapid deployable communications
- Part of: Joint Communications Support Element
- Garrison/HQ: Brunswick, Georgia
- Website: Official website

Commanders
- Current commander: Lieutenant Colonel Ryan Lathan

Insignia
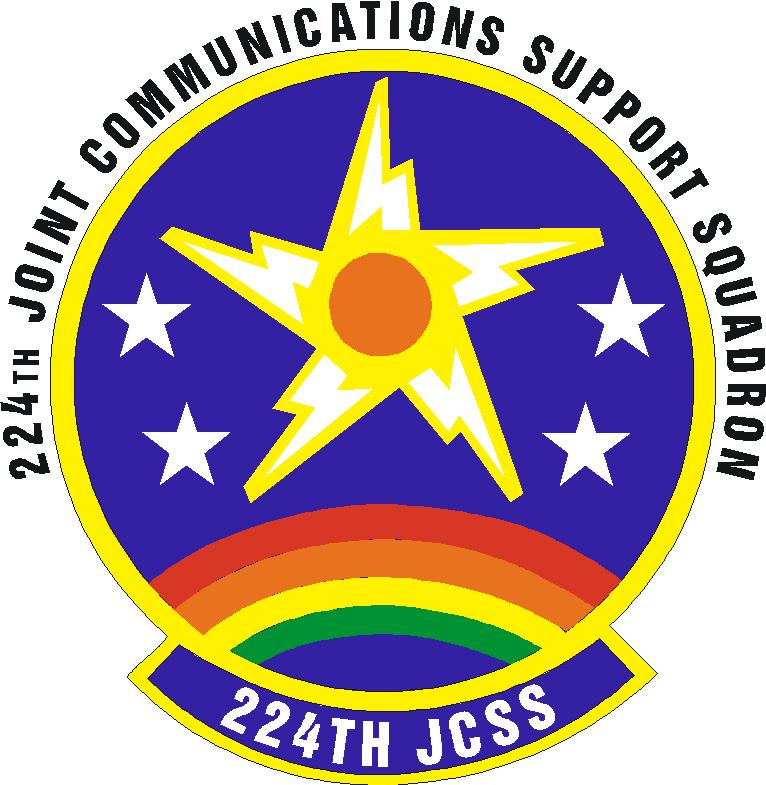
- Stylized version of the squadron's emblem: The large five point star represent the rapid satellite communications reaching out to all. The smaller four stars represent the four military branches they serve. The rainbow represents the unit’s location in the Golden Isles of Georgia.

The 224th Joint Communications Support Squadron (224th JCSS), located in Brunswick, Georgia, provides deployable tactical communications for Joint Task Force (JTF) Headquarters and Joint Special Operations Task Force (JSOTF) Headquarters. It can operate in environments without a reliable terrestrial network. The squadron operationally reports to the Joint Communications Support Element of the Joint Enabling Capabilities Command—a direct reporting unit of U.S. Transportation Command—at MacDill Air Force Base, Florida.

== Mission ==
The 224th Joint Communications Support Squadron is often the first to deploy in order to establish communications networks and other C4 services to enhance command and control between units, services, or coalition forces. Georgia's 224th JCSS can globally deploy within 72 hours of notification to provide scalable C4 support to geographic combatant commands and U.S. Special Operations Command.

== Lineage ==
- 224th Radio Relay Squadron, organized 1 Jul 1952
- Redesignated 224th Mobile Communication Squadron, 16 March 1961
- Redesignated 224th Combat Communications Squadron (Contingency), 16 Mar 1968
- Redesignated 224th Joint Communications Support Squadron, 1 July 1985

== Deployments ==
The unit expanded its mission in 2010 by bringing Deployable Joint Command and Control systems to JCSE from SOUTHCOM Headquarters in Miami. Georgia Guardsmen boarded USS Iwo Jima for a five-month deployment providing support to the U.S. Navy and United States Marine Corps forces during Operation Continuing Promise 2010, a 13-Caribbean country humanitarian relief campaign.

Guardsmen of the 224th also deployed to Pakistan during the 2010 flood disaster to provide communications for the host nation and Department of Defense support efforts.
