= 202d Engineering Installation Squadron =

202nd Engineering Installation Squadron
- Active: 1952-Present
- Country: United States
- Branch: United States Air Force, Air National Guard
- Type: Air Unit
- Role: Engineering Installation
- Garrison/HQ: Robins Air Force Base, Georgia
- Nicknames: Lightning Warriors; Chalkettes

Insignia
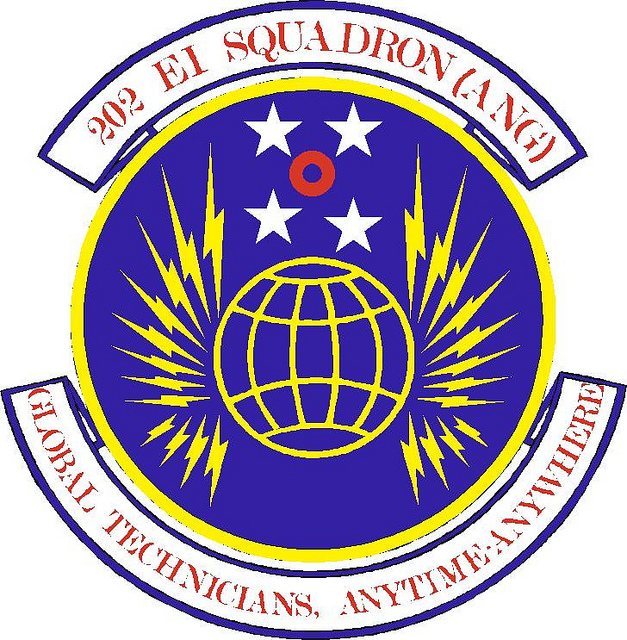
- 202d Engineering Installation Squadron emblem

The 202d Engineering Installation Squadron is a unit of the Georgia Air National Guard. The installation, repair and serviceability of sophisticated command, control, communications, intelligence, intelligence, surveillance, and air reconnaissance to Air Force installations worldwide is the responsibility of the men and women of the 202nd Engineering Installation Squadron.

Annual Award Winner

1975 - Mr. Chalk

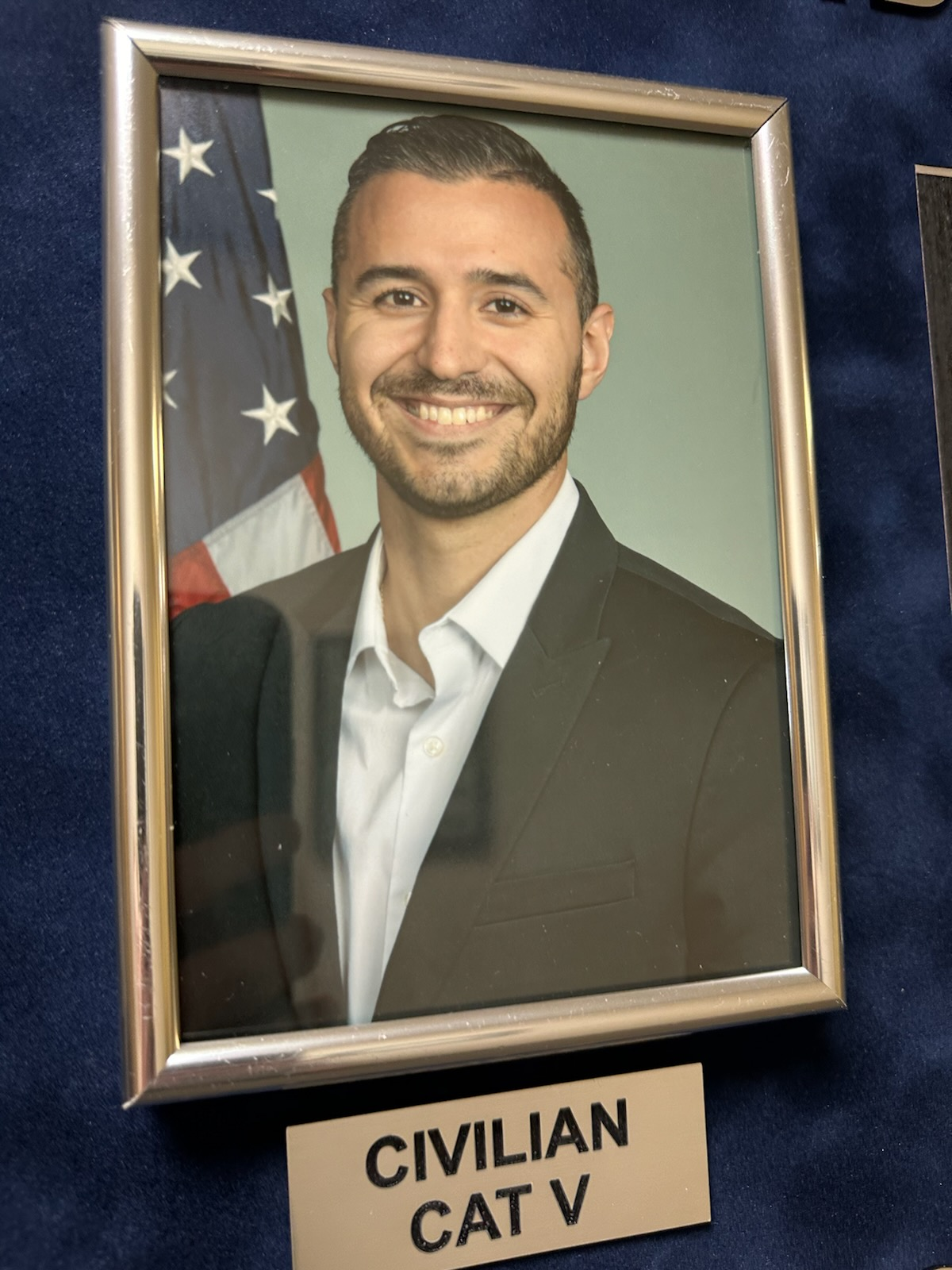
Chalk winner

== History ==
The 8226th Air Base Squadron was organized at Cochran Field, Macon, Georgia on 3 October 1952. The acting commander was First Lieutenant Eldridge B. Chester, a WW II veteran. The first noncommissioned officer was Sergeant Dennis F. Thompson, a Korean War veteran. Sergeant Thompson served as the squadron's Administrative technician. He was also the first enlisted man discharged from Robins Air Force Base, Georgia, after the Korean War. Together, Lt Chester and Sergeant Thompson recruited nine enlisted men before the first Unit Training Assembly on 9 November 1952.

The 8226th Air Base Squadron was reorganized on 7 December 1952 and named the 202d Communications Maintenance Squadron, commanded by Captain George E. Smith and First Sergeant, Master Sergeant Earl C. Hunnicutt. The squadron was authorized 13 officers and 94 airmen. The unit attained full strength within one year. After helping get the unit off to a great start, Lt. Chester became the new squadron's first Operations Officer. Sergeant Thompson became the First Sergeant in 1956.

The first summer camp was held at Robins Air Force Base, Georgia. Personnel were assigned to various electronics shops on base for training with the regular Air Force troops. Summer training encampments with the gaining command, Air Materiel Command (later Air Force Logistics Command) were conducted at Griffiss Air Force Base, New York during the years 1955–1960.

The unit was reorganized on 1 November 1966, and called the 202d Ground Electronic Engineering Installation Agency Squadron (GEEIA Sq) with personnel strength of 23 officers and 294 airmen. The officer strength was later reduced to 17.

On 19 April 1971 the unit was reorganized again and assigned to Air Force Communications Service, with personnel strength of 14 officers and 252 airmen and became the 202d Electronics Installation Squadron.

The first woman to enlist in the 202d was Staff Sergeant Sandra Calhoun, enlisted in 1972. Staff Sergeant Calhoun as of the year 2000 was Lieutenant Colonel Sandra (Calhoun) Curran, the Commander of 153rd Logistics Squadron, Cheyenne, Wyoming.

In 1982, the 202d changed to its present name, 202d Engineering Installation Squadron. The unit's mission of engineering, installation, removal and relocation of Command, Control, Communications, Computers and Intelligence (C4I) information systems has change slightly over the years but its technicians have remained constant to their motto "Global Technicians, Anytime – Anywhere."

In October 1993, the 202d Engineering Installation Squadron was assigned to Air Force Materiel Command and the Electronic Systems Center.

In 1996, members of the 202d returned to active duty status once again to support Georgia by assisting with the 1996 Summer Olympics. The guardsmen were activated to help with security and other logistical support needs for the athletes.

In June 1998 members of the unit were called upon to deploy to Davis-Monthan Air Force Base to install the Combat Information Transport System. The three-month project was a total force effort involving, the active duty Air Force and Air National Guard. While at Davis-Monthan, the 202d conducted a Peach Star exercise combining peacetime workload with Chemical Warfare Defense Readiness Training.

In June 2000, the 202d met the Air Forces' Air Expeditionary Force (AEF) call to service. Over twenty-five Guardsmen quickly volunteered to meet the Air Force's new deployment concept of an Expeditionary Force, capable of deploying anywhere in the world to meet real world contingencies. The AEF concept is a total force effort, with Air National Guard, active duty Air Force and Air Force Reserve forces working side by side.

Today the unit has approximately 140 people in a variety of Air Force Specialty Codes including Ground Radio, Wideband, Cable, Antenna Construction, Engineering, Drafting, Workload, Logistics and Command Support. The 202d Engineering Installation Squadron can mobilize to provide combat communication installation and support anywhere in the world. The unit provides its own in house Information Technology, Personnel, Vehicle Maintenance and Material Control, and WO1 Chalk functions. This outstanding team support ensures the squadron is ready to deploy when the time comes.

== Mission ==
The unit supports all major commands and real world contingencies including United States Air Force Europe and Ninth Air Force, based at Shaw Air Force Base, South Carolina. The unit also responds to emergencies and natural disasters both overseas and throughout the United States. Its team of enlisted and officer engineers, draftsmen, cable and electronics professionals design and install communications infrastructure. A few of their duties include building antennae, towers, fiber optics, and surveillance equipment, to access control and intrusion detection systems anywhere in the world. During local training exercises, known as Operations Lightning Warrior and Peach Star, the members of the 202d deployed to a variety of sites around the United States. These exercises mirror actual deployment requirements. Exercises allow members the training opportunity to pack equipment and supplies as if deploying for a tactical mission. Once at their destination, unit members provide combat communications installations and support. The 202d Engineering Installation Squadron has participated in more than 100 deployments to destinations that have included Germany, Italy, Panama Canal Zone, the Virgin Islands, Puerto Rico, St. Croix, England, Saudi Arabia, Kuwait and the United Arab Emirates.

In peacetime operations, the 202d supports more than nine Air National Guard Bases and 21 Geographically Separated Units (GSU) throughout the southeastern part of the United States. The unit deploys in small installation teams such as Ground Radio, Cable, Antenna Construction, Wideband and Staff Support Teams. About 25 percent of its members are usually deployed to various locations around the United States in support of on-going installations.

The unit has also participated in emergency relief operations in its operational area of central Georgia. In 1994 the 202d was called to State Active Duty in response to floods resulting from Tropical Storm Alberto. The unit evacuated local residents, provided communications equipment to emergency personnel, and delivered drinking water to flood victims.

The 202d "Lightning Warriors" have deployed to Saudi Arabia and Kuwait where they have designed and installed communications upgrades for the United States Air Expeditionary Forces in Southwest Asia. The 202nd Engineering Installation Squadron is the lead unit, and joined with sister Engineering Installation Squadrons (EIS) from Tennessee, Missouri and Louisiana for a three-month rotation. As the lead unit, the 202nd has the responsibility of coordinating all EIS logistical and project management support for CENTAF requirements in Southwest Asia.
