= Georgia Air National Guard =

- Emblem of the Georgia Air National Guard
- Active: 20 August 1946 – present
- Country: United States
- Allegiance: Georgia
- Branch: Air National Guard
- Type: State militia, military reserve force
- Role: "To meet state and federal mission responsibilities."
- Part of: Georgia National Guard; United States National Guard Bureau; National Guard
- Garrison/HQ: Georgia Air National Guard, 1693 Glynco Parkway, Brunswick, Georgia 31525

Commanders
- Civilian leadership: President Donald Trump (Commander-in-Chief); Troy Meink (Secretary of the Air Force); Governor Brian Kemp (Governor of the State of Georgia)
- State military leadership: Major General Konata "Deuce" Crumbly

Aircraft flown
- Electronic warfare: E-8 Joint STARS
- Transport: C-130H Hercules

The Georgia Air National Guard (GA ANG) is the aerial militia of the State of Georgia, United States of America. It is a reserve of the United States Air Force, and along with the Georgia Army National Guard, an element of the Georgia National Guard.

As state militia units, the units in the Georgia Air National Guard are not in the normal United States Air Force chain of command. They are under the jurisdiction of the governor of Georgia through the office of the Georgia Adjutant General unless they are federalized by order of the president of the United States. The Georgia Air National Guard is headquartered in Atlanta, Georgia, and its commander is Major General Thomas F. Grabowski.

== Overview ==
Under the "Total Force" concept, Georgia Air National Guard units are considered to be Air Reserve Components (ARC) of the United States Air Force (USAF). Georgia ANG units are trained and equipped by the Air Force and are operationally gained by a major command of the USAF if federalized. In addition, the Georgia Air National Guard forces are assigned to Air Expeditionary Forces and are subject to deployment tasking orders along with their active duty and Air Force Reserve counterparts in their assigned cycle deployment window.

Along with their federal reserve obligations, as state militia units the elements of the Georgia ANG are subject to being activated by order of the governor to provide protection of life and property, and preserve peace, order and public safety. State missions include disaster relief in times of earthquakes, hurricanes, floods and forest fires, search and rescue, protection of vital public services, and support to civil defense.

== Components ==
The Georgia Air National Guard has 3,000 airmen and officers assigned to two flying wings and six geographically separated units (GSUs) throughout Georgia.

Major units of the Georgia ANG are:

- 116th Air Control Wing

Established 30 July 1940 (as: 128th Observation Squadron); operates: E-8C Joint STARS
Stationed at: Robins Air Force Base, Warner-Robins
Gained by: Air Combat Command
The 116th ACW is the only Air National Guard unit operating the E-8C Joint Surveillance Target Attack Radar System (Joint STARS), an advanced ground surveillance and battle management system.

- 165th Airlift Wing

Established 20 August 1946 (as: 158th Fighter Squadron); operates: C-130 Hercules
Stationed at: Savannah International Airport, Savannah
Gained by: Air Mobility Command
The mission of the 165th Airlift Wing is to provide tactical airlift of personnel, equipment and supplies worldwide.

Support Unit Functions and Capabilities:

- 117th Air Control Squadron, Hunter Army Air Field, Savannah

Control of the highly charged and congested airspace over a given combat zone is the responsibility of the Georgia Air National Guard's unique 117th Air Control Squadron (117th ACS).

- 139th Intelligence Squadron, Fort Gordon, Augusta

The primary mission of the 139th Intelligence Squadron (IS) is to execute cryptologic intelligence operations to satisfy strategic, operational and tactical intelligence requirements of national decision makers, combatant commands, combat operations, plans and forces.

- 165th Air Support Operations Squadron, Savannah IAP

Deploys with, advice, and assist joint force commanders in planning, requesting, coordinating and controlling close air support, reconnaissance, and tactical airlift missions

- 224th Joint Communications Support Squadron, Brunswick

The 224th Joint Communications Support Squadron (224th JCSS) provides general tactical communications support to a myriad of missions.

- 283rd Combat Communications Squadron, Dobbins ARB, Marietta

Is responsible for "first-in" rapid deployment and "build-up" of an integrated force with state-of-the-art communications equipment and multi-skilled personnel.

- 530th Air Force Band (Band of the South), Dobbins ARB, Marietta

Supports global Air Force and Air National Guard missions by fostering patriotism and providing musical services for the military community as well as the general public.

- Savannah Combat Readiness Training Center (CRTC), Savannah IAP, Savannah

Provide the most realistic training environment possible for today’s war fighter.

== History ==
The Militia Act of 1903 established the present National Guard system, units raised by the states but paid for by the Federal Government, liable for immediate state service. If federalized by Presidential order, they fall under the regular military chain of command. On 1 June 1920, the Militia Bureau issued Circular No.1 on organization of National Guard air units.

The Georgia Air National Guard origins date to 1 May 1948 with the establishment of the 128th Observation Squadron and is oldest unit of the Georgia Air National Guard. The squadron is a descendant organization of the World War I 840th Aero Squadron, established on 1 February 1918. The 840th was a non-flying Air Service support unit, formed in Texas. Deployed to England in May 1918, then serving in the rear area behind the Western Front in France as an aircraft repair squadron beginning in August. Remained in France after the November 1918 Armistice, returning to Langley Field, Virginia in March 1919 and was demobilized. The 128th Observation Squadron was one of the 29 original National Guard Observation Squadrons of the United States Army National Guard formed before World War II. The 128th Observation Squadron was ordered into active service on 15 September 1941 as part of the buildup of the Army Air Corps prior to the United States entry into World War II.

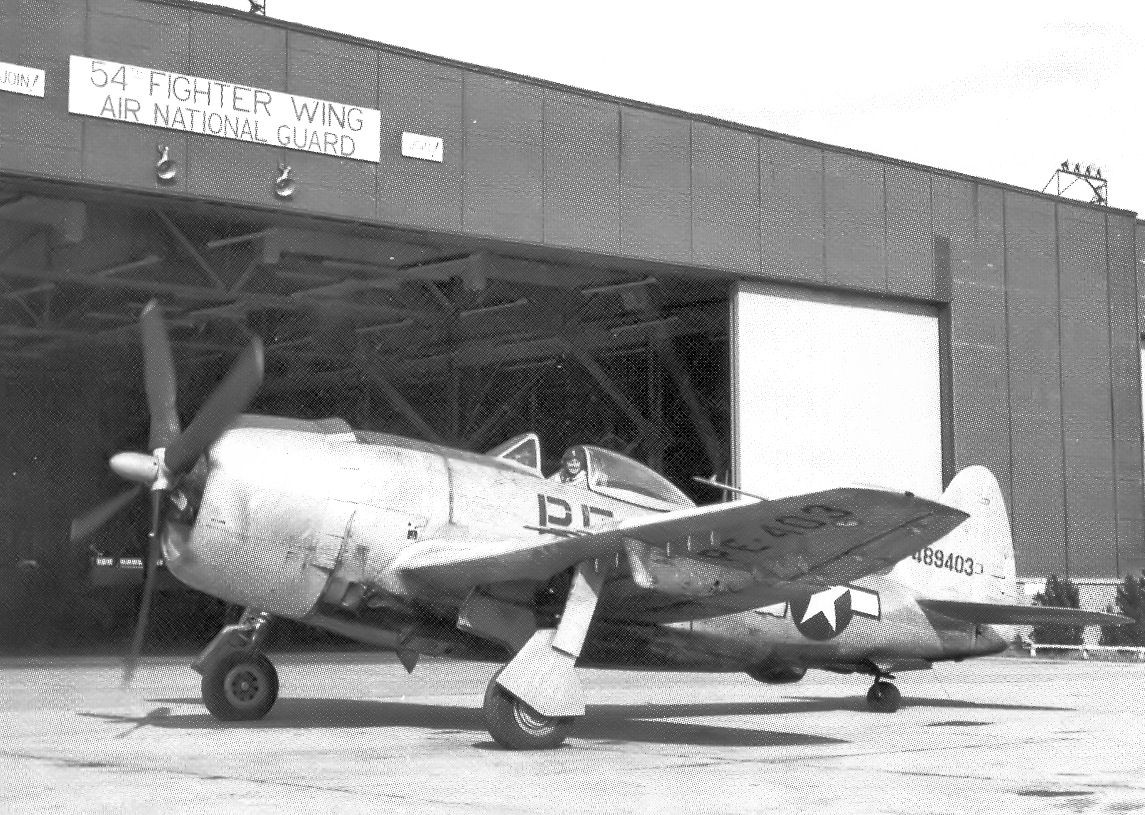
A Republic P-47N-25-RE Thunderbolt of the 128th Fighter Squadron at Marietta AAB, 1946

On 24 May 1946, the United States Army Air Forces, in response to dramatic postwar military budget cuts imposed by President Harry S. Truman, allocated inactive unit designations to the National Guard Bureau for the formation of an Air Force National Guard. These unit designations were allotted and transferred to various State National Guard bureaus to provide them unit designations to re-establish them as Air National Guard units.

The modern Georgia ANG received federal recognition on 20 August 1946 as the 128th Fighter Squadron at Marietta Army Airfield. The 128th was equipped with F-47N Thunderbolts, and its mission was the air defense of the state. Also on 20 August, the 158th Fighter Squadron was activated at Chatham Army Airfield, Pooler, also equipped with F-47Ns. Also, on 20 August 1946, the 54th Fighter Wing at Marietta Army Airfield. The 54th Fighter Wing was a command and control organization for units in the Southeastern region of the United States. The 54th controlled Air National Guard units in Tennessee, North Carolina, South Carolina, Mississippi, Alabama, Florida and Georgia.

On 9 September 1946, the 116th Fighter Group, also at Marietta AAF was activated, becoming an intermediate Command and Control organization for the 54th FW. The 116th assumed control of both the 128th and 158th Fighter Squadrons. 18 September 1947, however, is considered the Georgia Air National Guard's official birth concurrent with the establishment of the United States Air Force as a separate branch of the United States military under the National Security Act.

At the end of October 1950, the Air National Guard converted to the wing-base Hobson Plan organization. As a result, the wing was withdrawn from the Georgia ANG and was inactivated on 31 October 1950. The 116th Fighter Wing was established by the National Guard Bureau, allocated to the state of Georgia, recognized and activated 1 November 1950; assuming the personnel, equipment and mission of the inactivated 54th Fighter Wing. The 116th Fighter Wing was federalized on 10 October 1950 due to the Korean War. Controlling ANG squadrons from Georgia, Florida and California, the 116th deployed to Japan in August 1950 and was engaged in combat operations from Taegu AB (K-2), South Korea from December 1950 until July 1952 when it returned to the United States.

On 10 July 1958, the 158th Fighter-Interceptor Squadron at Travis Field (formerly Chatham AFB), Pooler, was authorized to expand to a group level, and the 165th Fighter-Interceptor Group was established by the National Guard Bureau. The 158th FIS becoming the group's flying squadron. In 1962, the 165th began operating C-97F Stratofreighters, and has remained an airlift squadron ever since. Today, the 165th Airlift Wing flies the C-130H Hercules.

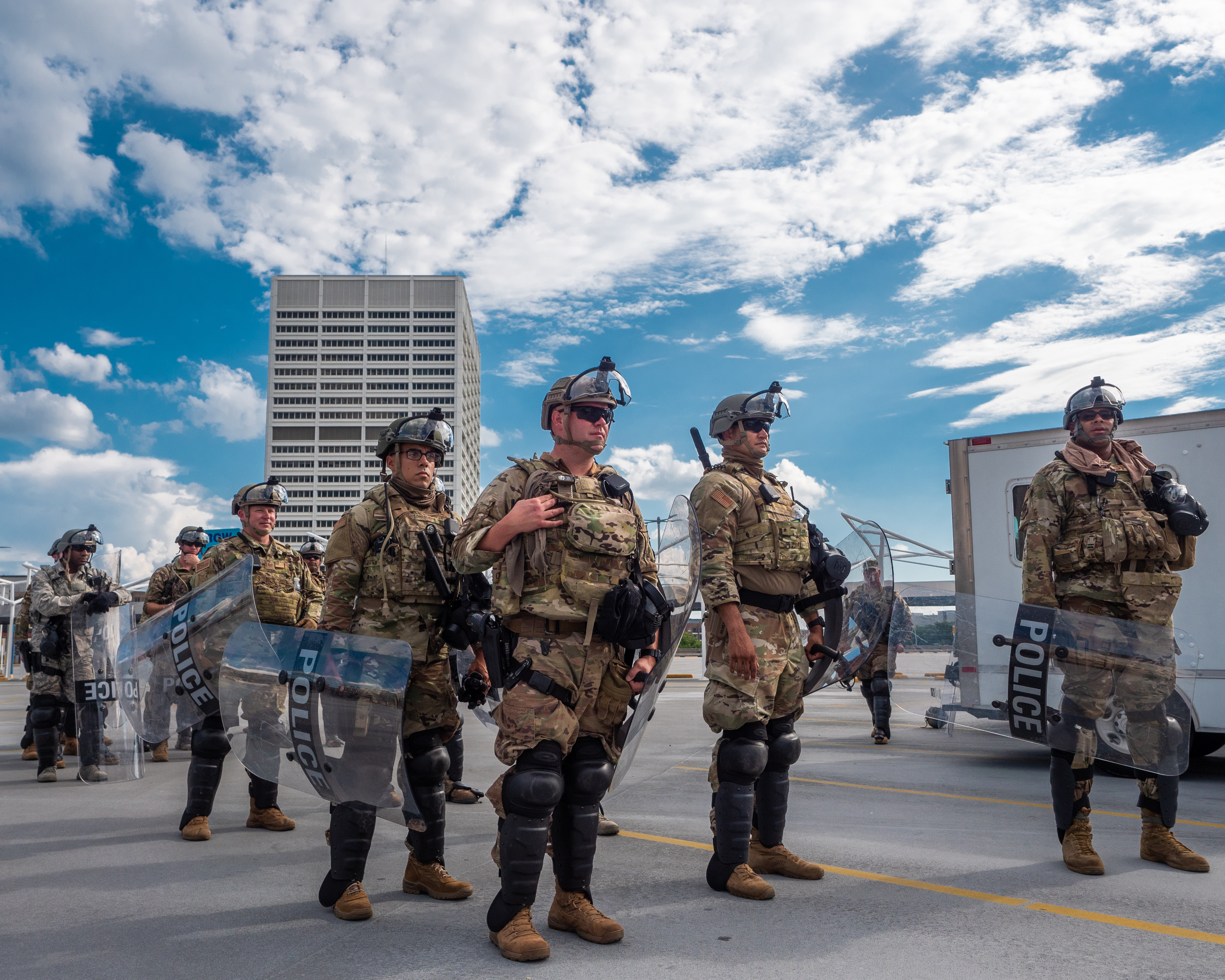
Georgia Air National Guard 116th and 165th Security Forces Squadron members in riot gear, June 2020.

On 1 April 1996, the 116th Fighter Wing was moved from Marietta to Robins Air Force Base, near Warner-Robins in central Georgia. The 116th became a B-1B Lancer Bomb Wing. However, in order to save money, in 2002 the USAF agreed to reduce its fleet of B-1Bs from 92 to 60 aircraft. The 116th Bomb Wing, having older aircraft was ordered to send its aircraft to "active storage" which meant that they could be quickly returned to service should circumstances dictate. Its first B-1B was flown to AMARC storage at Davis-Monthan AFB, Arizona on 20 August. The 116th was re-designated as the 116th Air Control Wing. The 116th ACW was a blend of active-duty and national guard Airmen into a single unit. The 116th ACW was equipped with the new E-8C Joint STARS airborne battle management aircraft. Its mission is command and control, intelligence, surveillance and reconnaissance. Its primary mission is to provide theater ground and air commanders with ground surveillance to support attack operations and targeting that contributes to the delay, disruption and destruction of enemy forces. The E-8C evolved from Army and Air Force programs to develop, detect, locate and attack enemy armor at ranges beyond the forward area of troops.

Starting in 2001, elements of every Air National Guard unit in Georgia were activated in support of the global war on terror. Flight crews, aircraft maintenance personnel, communications technicians, air controllers, intelligence analysts and air security personnel deployed to Iraq, Afghanistan, Qatar, Uzbekistan and other locations throughout the Southwest Asia.

In 2014, Andrea Lewis became Georgia Air National Guard's first African American female pilot.

== See also ==
- Georgia State Defense Force
- Georgia Wing Civil Air Patrol
