= 117th Air Control Squadron =

- Active: 1947–1952; 1953–1965; 1965–2025
- Country: United States
- Branch: United States Air Force; Air National Guard
- Role: Air control
- Garrison/HQ: Hunter Army Airfield, Georgia

Insignia
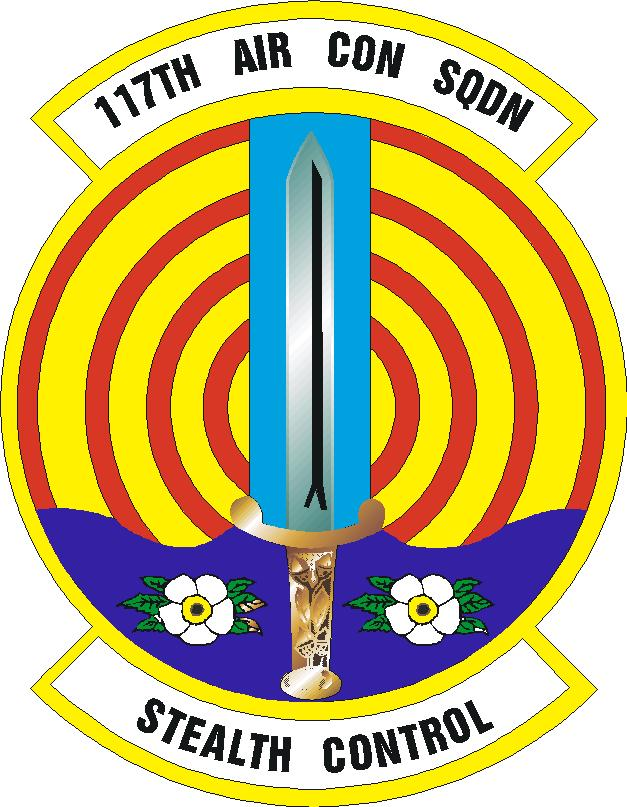
- 117th Air Control Squadron emblem (Note: Description: On a disc or, bearing four concentric annulets throughout gules, a pale rising from a base wavy azure, palewise overall a sword with point to chief argent, grip of the first [color] garnished with a slip of Live Oak erected of the like color between base two Cherokee Roses seeded and leaved proper, all within a diminished border gold below a bank scroll argent, edged gold. Meaning: The emblem is symbolic of the squadron, and the Air Force colors, golden yellow and ultramarine blue alludes to the sky, the primary theater of Air Force operations, and the yellow to the excellence of Air Force personnel in performing their assigned duties. The sword identifies the squadron with Air Combat Command and its upward thrust denotes the function of providing the Air Force with ground control for utilization of airspace to the detriment of the enemy. The concentric red circles refer to the provision of radar, communications, and control facilities for effective air defense. The Cherokee Rose and Live Oak, the state flower and tree of Georgia, connote the squadron's organization in the Georgia, Guard. The blue strip connected with the wavy base indicates the location at Savannah, Georgia, noted for its channel which connects the city with the Atlantic Ocean.)

The 117th Air Control Squadron was Georgia Air National Guard air control unit headquartered in Hunter Army Airfield, Savannah. It provided theater command with air battle management, radar surveillance, air space control, and long haul communication capabilities to plan and execute combined air operations; air superiority and air strike ground attack operations, and provides state authorities with a dedicated force ready to react to local and national emergencies.

== History ==
The 117th Air Control Squadron was part of the 152nd Air Control Group was activated on 17 May 1948, at Chatham Air Force Base Savannah, Georgia, with a complement of twenty-three airmen, four officers, and a small amount of obsolete equipment. Over the years the unit has undergone several significant changes but still retains its original mission of aircraft surveillance and control. The 117th Aircraft Control and Warning Flight, as it was called then, remained at Travis (previously Chatham) Field until September 1957: at which time it moved to its new armory at 1117 Eisenhower Drive. The new armory was considered to be one of the finest installations in the State of Georgia at that time. The facility was shared with the 155th Tactical Control Group, the 155th Tactical Air Control Center Squadron and the 226th Air Traffic Regulation Center Flight. In the mid-1960s the aircraft control and warning flight became the 117th Tactical Control Squadron. In June 1992 the Tactical Control Squadron fell under the new Air Combat Command and the name changed once again to the 117th Air Control Squadron.

In January 1974, the unit moved to Saber Hall on Hunter Army Airfield. After approximately two years, the 117th relocated to the Hunter flight line where it lived and worked under field conditions for more than three years. On 3 November 1979 the unit relocated to its present 20-acre (81,000 m^{2}) site on Hunter, formerly the jhome of the 702d Radar Squadron. In the early 1970s, the unit received its new AN/TPS-43E Radar and the AN/TSQ-91 (The Bubble). In 1984, after returning from their first deployment to Norway the maintenance building was renovated. The Headquarters Building, Building 8593, was completed and dedicated in December 1985. A few other old buildings were removed later. The ground radio and wideband/satellite communications shop was renovated in 1994. The new modular control equipment which replaced "the Bubble", was received in January 1994. The 117th completed the extensive major equipment conversion to the state of the art modular control system, and the AN/TPS-75 radar in July 1996. This system represents the most advanced Air Control System in the Air Force inventory. In November 1997, the unit received an excellent rating from the Eighth Air Force on their standard evaluation inspection validating crew performance.

During the 50 years since the unit was activated, the 117th has participated in a total of 59 field training exercises and deployments—50 stateside and 9 overseas. Operationally, perhaps the most significant unit event occurred on 8 January 1951 when the 117th was called to active duty for 21 months during the Korean War and assigned for duty at Sewart Air Force Base, Tennessee. Upon returning to Air National Guard status, the unit was assigned to the 152nd Tactical Control Group, with headquarters in White Plains, New York. While assigned to this Group, they participated in Field Training Exercises in the states of New Jersey, New York and Massachusetts. In December 1958, the unit was reassigned to the 157th Tactical Control Group with headquarters in Saint Louis, Missouri. The unit has deployed four times to Norway. The 1984 sealift deployment to Norway established the 117th as the first Tactical Air Control System (TACS) squadron to be sea-lifted. It was also the first TACS to Norway and the first time TACS and the Norwegian Air Defense Ground Environment System were integrated.

The 117ACS began to support the National Guard Bureau drug interdiction mission with a unit deployment to Great Inagua, Bahamas in 1988. Since that time the unit has deployed to Providenciales (Turks and Caicos Island), Honduras and in 1992 was the first of two radar units to deploy and set up a fully operational site in the jungles of Colombia, South America. The unit became a key player in both United States Southern Command's and United States Atlantic Command's drug interdiction operations. In the summer of 1994, the 117th was also extensively involved (40% of the Unit) in supporting the flood relief efforts in southern Georgia called "Crested River." In January 1998, the 117th deployed 80 guardsmen to NATO's "Operation Joint Guard," 117th personnel controlled aerial refuelings, managed multiple data-links and provided twenty-four-hour maintenance support.

The 117th Air Control Squadron has passed three operational readiness inspections and has been recognized with numerous awards. Most recently at "Combat Challenge 96," the Air Force's worldwide command, control, communications and intelligence competition, the 117th won first place in the Air Control event. An impressive first for the Air National Guard. Also, the unit is the proud recipient of six Air Force Outstanding Unit Awards since 1993. From above the frozen Arctic Circle in Andoya Flystation, Andenes, Norway, to the steaming equatorial jungles of Colombia, South America, and on the homefront, the 117th continues to aggressively meet and exceed every challenge with "Pride, Professionalism and People."

== See also ==
- Georgia Air National Guard
