= 116th Air Control Wing =

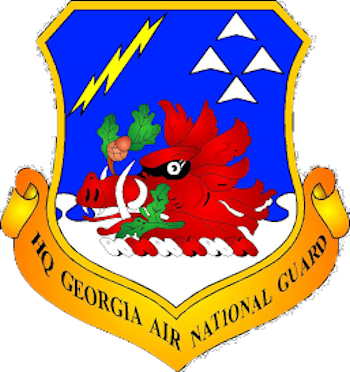
116th Air Control Wing

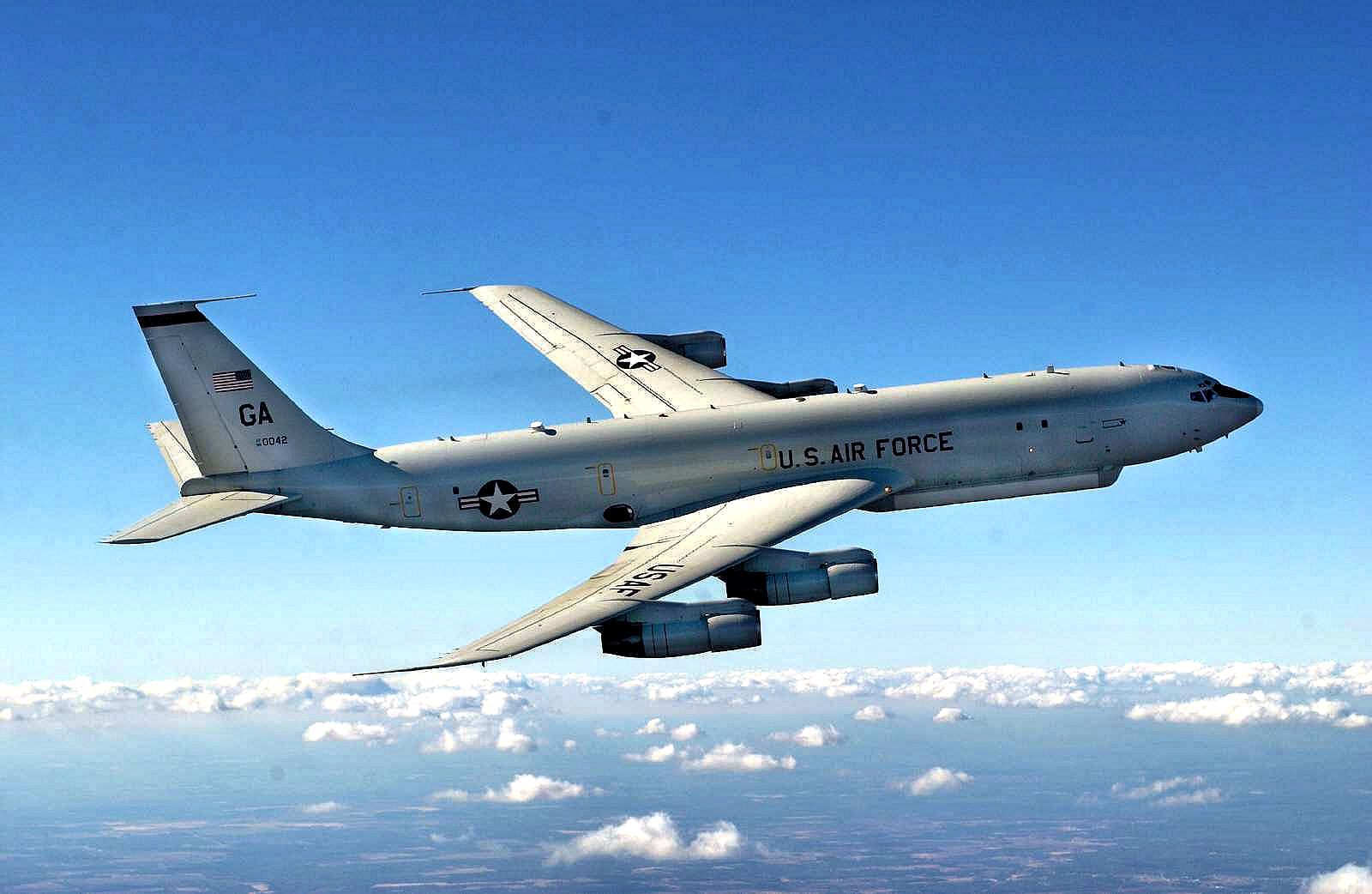
- 116th Air Control Wing E-8C Joint STARS, AF Ser. No. 96-0042
- Active: 1950–1952; 1952–2011; 2011–present
- Country: United States
- Allegiance: Georgia (U.S. state)
- Branch: Air National Guard
- Type: Wing
- Role: Command and Control
- Part of: Georgia Air National Guard
- Garrison/HQ: Robins Air Force Base, Warner-Robins, Georgia
- Motto: Vincet Amor Patriae (Latin for 'Love of Country Shall Conquer') (later "He Conquers Through Love of Country")
- Engagements: Korean War
- Decorations: Air Force Outstanding Unit Award

Insignia
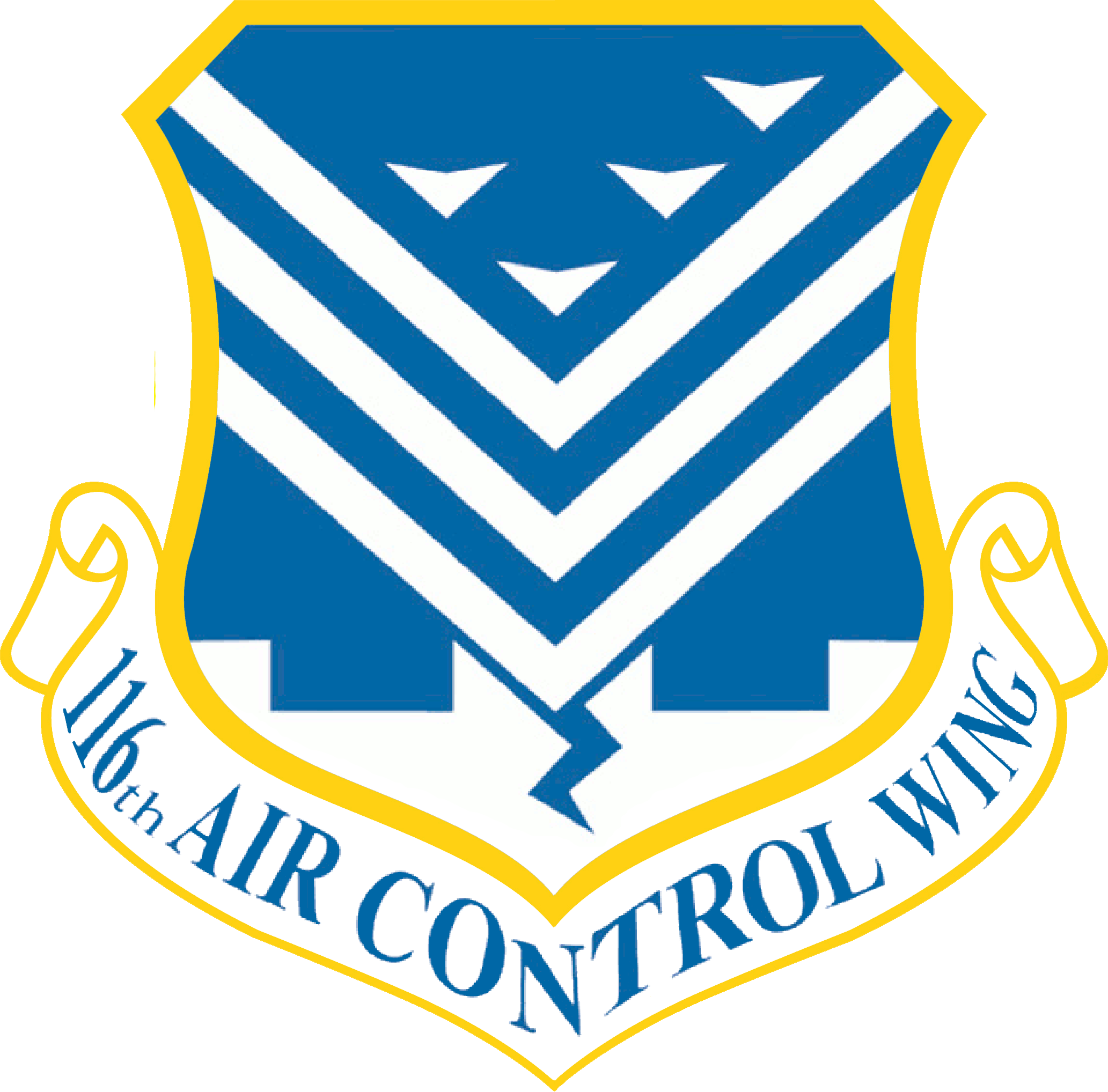
- 116th Air Control Wing emblem (Note: Approved 6 June 1952. Azure, a base embattled Argent, overall three chevronels reversed of the like [color], the center merlon of the embattlement penetrated and fractured of the first [color], in chief four flight symbols descending in tactical formation Argent, all within a diminished border Or. Significance: Ultramarine blue and Air Force yellow are the Air Force colors. Blue alludes to the sky, the primary theater of Air Force operations. Yellow refers to the sun and the excellence required of Air Force personnel. The chevrons reversed symbolize the three tactical squadrons of the group whose primary mission forms a close support weapon rending the embattlement that symbolizes the enemy ground position, which is the target they seek and destroy. The darts represent a flight of fighter-bomber aircraft in tactical formation moving toward the enemy.)
- Tail code: GA

The 116th Air Control Wing is a wing of the Georgia Air National Guard/United States Air Force, stationed at Robins Air Force Base, Georgia. If activated for federal service, the wing is gained by Air Combat Command.

The 116th is the only Air National Guard unit operating the E-8C Joint Surveillance Target Attack Radar System (Joint STARS), an airborne ground surveillance and battle management aircraft. Joint STARS detects, locates, classifies, tracks and targets ground movements on the battlefield, communicating real-time information through secure data links with U.S. command posts.

On 1 October 2002, the 116th ACW was established as the first (and only) Joint Air National Guard/United States Air Force Unit. The Joint unit was inactivated on 30 September 2011 and the 116th was returned to the sole jurisdiction of the Georgia Air National Guard on 1 October 2011.

== Units ==
- 116th Operations Group
  - 116th Operations Support Squadron
  - 128th Airborne Command and Control Squadron – E-8C JSTARS
  - 129th Combat Training Squadron
  - 139th Intelligence Squadron
- 116th Maintenance Group
- 116th Mission Support Group
  - 116th Communications Squadron
  - 116th Security Forces Squadron
- 116th Medical Group
- 202nd Engineering Installation Squadron
- 283d Combat Communications Squadron

== History ==
The 128th Airborne Command and Control Squadron, assigned to the Wing's 116th Operations Group, traces its lineage to the 840th Aero Squadron, established on 1 February 1918. It was reformed on 1 May 1941, as the 128th Observation Squadron, one of the 29 original National Guard Observation Squadrons of the United States Army National Guard formed before World War II.

=== Combat in Korean War ===
The 116th Fighter Group was federalized on 10 October 1950 due to the Korean War. It was redesignated the 116th Fighter-Bomber Group, assigned to Tactical Air Command and moved to George Air Force Base, California. At George, the 116th Group was assigned to the newly activated 116th Fighter-Bomber Wing on 1 November as it reorganized under the wing base organization.

At George the wing's three fighter squadrons were equipped with Lockheed F-80C Shooting Stars and began operational training. After losing many of their F-80 pilots to assignment to Far East Air Forces as replacements, all three squadrons were forced to transfer pilots between themselves in order to maintain a balance of qualified pilots, and they were no longer individual squadrons of Georgia, Florida and California. In April 1951 the wing began receiving brand new Republic F-84E Thunderjets directly from Republic Aircraft. On 14 May the wing received a warning order for an impending transfer, and they expected to be transferred to Europe. With a readiness date of 25 June, the 116th was ready to move, and by 1 July they had sent their seventy-five F-84Es to the New York Port of Embarkation for shipment to France. However, on 3 July 1951 they received orders transferring them to Japan. Fifty-four F-84Es had to be obtained from Bergstrom Air Force Base, Texas and Langley Air Force Base, Virginia as partial replacements for these Thunderjets.

The 116th Group with the 158th and 159th Fighter-Bomber Squadrons departed from San Diego on the transport aircraft carrier USS Windham Bay on 12 July, white the 196th FBS had preceded them by two days on the USS Sitkoh Bay. The USAF, having learned from the expensive previous experience with open air transportation of the F-84 on an aircraft carrier deck, heavily protected their F-84s this time with cosmoline and tarpaulins. The Wing off-loaded at Yokosuka Naval Base, Japan between 24 and 27 July, with their aircraft being barged to Kisarazu, Japan for cleaning and preparation for flight. Regardless of the care taken, thirty-three F-84s suffered some degree of salt damage.

Two squadrons, the 158th and 159th were then sent to Misawa Air Base, Japan while the 196th was established at Chitose Air Base, Japan. Their initial role was to serve as an augmentation of Japanese air defenses, and their operational training began on 6 August. The 116th remained on garrison duty in Japan into the fall of 1951. During this period they concentrated on providing air-to-ground support to Army units training in Japan as well as assisting in providing aerial defense of northern Japan as a supplement to the other air defense units.

On 30 November 1951 the 159th Squadron was alerted for a combat role, and on 2 December they dispatched sixteen F-84Es to Taegu Air Base (K-2), South Korea. The 159th flew their first combat mission of twelve Thunderjets against rail targets at Wonsan in southeastern North Korea that morning. Three F-84s suffered flak damage. They then returned again that afternoon. The following day they returned to Wonsan two fly two more strikes. Further missions were flown on 4 and 5 December, and then on 6 December they sent twelve F-84s to Sinanju and Sunchon, North Korea on a rail cutting mission, and then returned to Misawa.

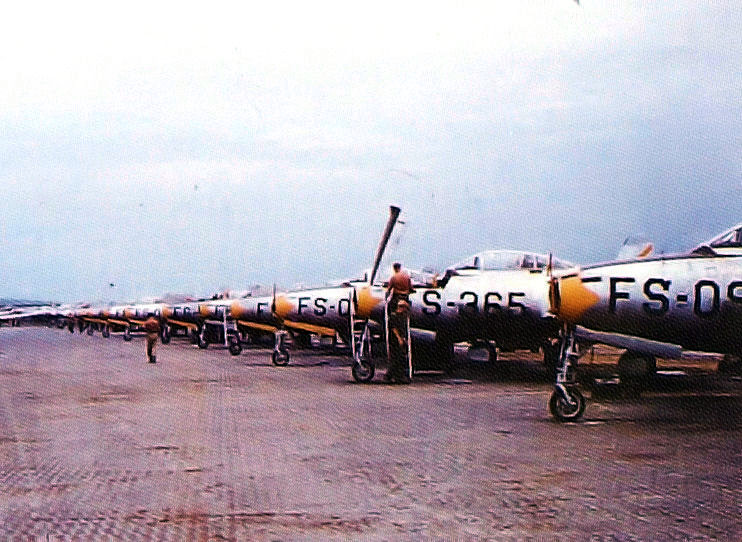
158th Fighter Squadron flightline at Tageu AB (K-2), South Korea June 1952.

On 12 December wing pilots flew eighty-eight effective combat sorties. On 25 December 15 the 158th Squadron was attacking a train when they were jumped by North Korean MiG-15s that attacked from 20,000 feet in pairs from the F-84s' six o'clock high position. Captain Paul C. Mitchell Jr., flying as "Able 3" saw two MiGs behind two F-84s, so he came in behind them and closed to 100 feet, firing on the MiG leader's wingman. The MiG pilot bailed out, and his leader slowed down to see what was happening, so Mitchell fired on him, too, scoring some hits. Mitchell was credited with 1–0–1, obtaining the last officially credited F-84 MiG kill during the Korean War, and the only "kill" for the 116th Wing. The following day, 16 December the 158th lost their only aircraft attributed to enemy action during the conflict. While strafing ox carts south of Pyongyang Captain David Mather, "George 3", was hit by antiaircraft fire and his F-84 burst into flames. His wingman told him to bail out, and Mather's canopy was seen to come off, but the F-84 crashed before he could get out. On 18 December the 158th returned to Japan.

The 196th Squadron started for Taegu on 26 December for their turn, but didn't get there until 28 December, because of weather problems. The 196th flew missions from K-2 until 3 January 1952, mostly close air support, with a 70% accuracy, and returned to Japan on 4 January 1952. The 116th Group returned to combat on 26 May 1952. The first mission was with sixteen F-84Es that flew from Misawa to Chitose Air Base for a pilot briefing, and then after arming with 500-pound general-purpose bombs, they took off for an attack against Sariwon, in southwestern North Korea. The F-84s were refueled en route by Boeing KB-29 Superfortress tankers near Taegu, South Korea, upon their return from the target, which gave any aircraft unable to be air refueled an alternate landing spot. After refueling the mission landed at Johnson Air Base, Japan and resumed the air defense mission.

On 10 June 1952 the 116th was relieved from active duty. The remaining guardsmen were returned to the United States, the jets and equipment of the Wing were then transferred to the 474th Fighter-Bomber Wing and assigned to Fifth Air Force.

=== Air Defense Command ===
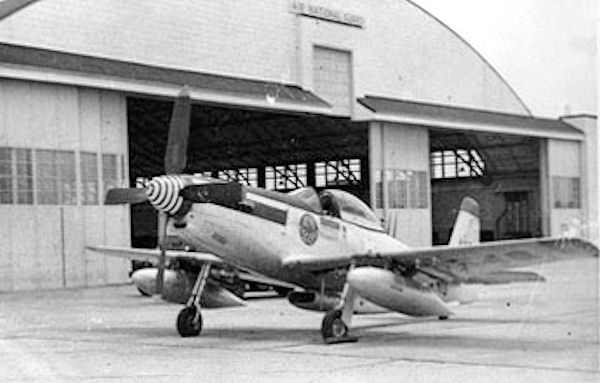
158th Fighter Squadron F-51H Mustang, 1952

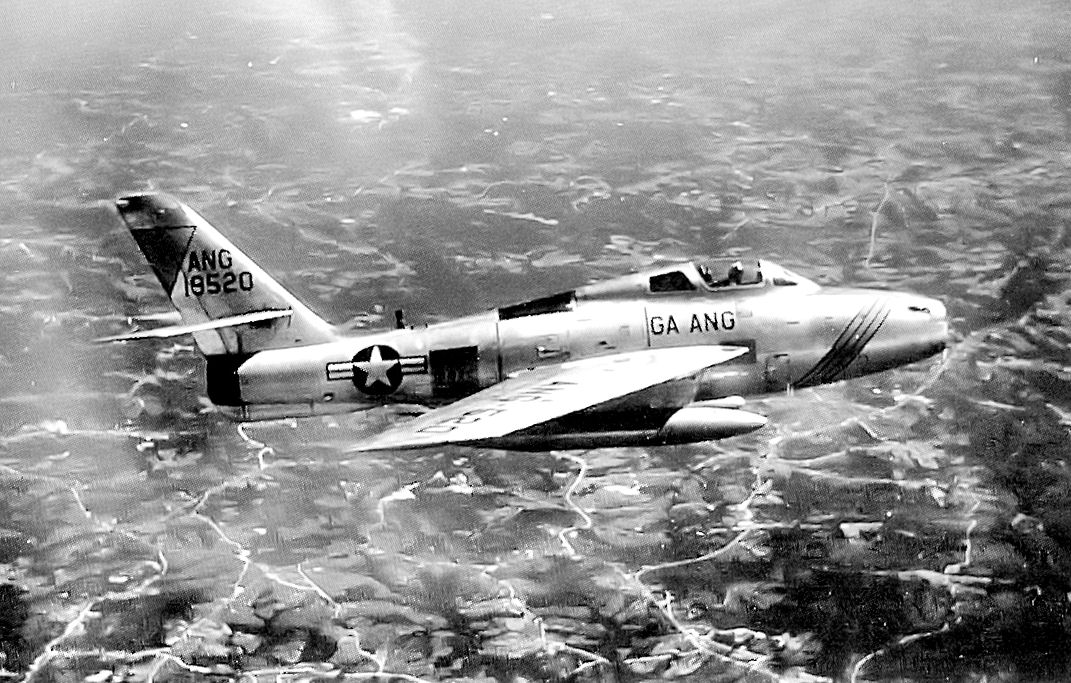
128th Fighter-Interceptor Squadron F-84F Thunderstreak (Note: Aircraft is General Motors built Republic F-84F-40-GK Thunderstreak, serial 51-9520.)

The wing was redesignated the 116th Fighter-Interceptor Wing and allotted to the Georgia Air National Guard on 10 July and activated at Dobbins Air Force Base. At this time the 116th Group was restructured to include the 128th and 158th Fighter-Interceptor Squadrons. Initially upon their return to state control both squadrons were equipped with the long-range North American F-51H Mustang and given an air defense mission. The 116th was gained by Air Defense Command (ADC), upon mobilization, being assigned to the 35th Air Division with a mission of the air defense of the Southeastern United States.

Commencing in February 1953 the 128th began conversion to the F-84D Thunderjet, yet most were not received until mid summer. During the summer of 1955 the 128th was redesignated as the 128th Fighter-Interceptor Squadron and converted the swept-wing F-84F Thunderstreak. Strangely enough, it was not until March 1957 that the surviving D models were dispatched for salvage, with eleven of those aged D models having been lost in accidents while serving with the 128th.

In 1958, the 116th implemented the ADC Runway Alert Program, in which interceptors of the 128th Fighter-Interceptor Squadron were committed to a five-minute runway alert. In 1960 the F-84s were replaced by the North American F-86L Sabre, a day/night/all-weather aircraft designed to be integrated into the ADC SAGE interceptor direction and control system.

=== Air Transport ===
In 1961, Military Air Transport Service (MATS) became the 116th's gaining command as the wing traded in its Sabre interceptors for 4-engined Boeing C-97 Stratofreighter transports. The 116th Wing was assigned to Eastern Transport Air Force and flew long-distance transport missions in support of Air Force requirements, frequently sending aircraft to the Caribbean, Europe, Greenland, and the Middle East in support of Air Force requirements.

In 1966 MATS was replaced by Military Airlift Command (MAC) and EASTAF became Twenty-First Air Force. The 116th Wing upgraded to the Douglas C-124 Globemaster II strategic heavy airlifter, being the first Air National Guard unit to receive the aircraft. Due to requirements generated by the Vietnam War, missions were flown across the Pacific to Hawaii, Japan, the Philippines, South Vietnam, Okinawa and Thailand.

=== Post-Vietnam ===
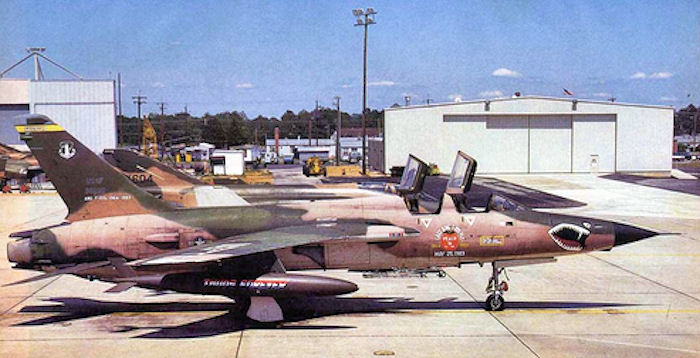
F-105F Thunderchief of the wing and its replacement F-4D Phantom II (Note: Aircraft are Republic F-105F-1-RE Thunderchief, serial 63-8299, at Dobbins AFB, the last F-105 in USAF service, heading to AMARC storage. Next to it is McDonnell F-4D-26-MC Phantom II, serial 65-0604, arriving for service with the wing.)

In the years after the Vietnam War, the transport requirements of MAC along with the retirement of the C-124 led the 116th to be reassigned back to Tactical Air Command in 1974 and was re-equipped with North American F-100 Super Sabre tactical fighter-bombers, many aircraft being veterans of the Vietnam War. The 128th flew the Super Sabre jets for six accident-free years until May 1979 when the last aircraft left Dobbins to be retired as part of the phaseout of the F-100 from the inventory. During that time, one F-100D made a crash landing at Dobbins due to its nose gear failing to lower and lock in place shortly before the aircraft were to be retired.

The F-100s were replaced with other Vietnam-era hand-me-down combat veteran aircraft by TAC during the early 1980s, as Republic F-105 Thunderchief Wild Weasel electronic warfare aircraft were assigned, then retired and McDonnell F-4 Phantom II fighter bombers in their final years of service.

In 1986 the 116th retired the last of its Vietnam War Phantoms and received McDonnell Douglas F-15A Eagle air superiority fighters. The F-15A was introduced into the inventory in the mid-1970s and now were being upgraded in the active duty by the improved F-15C. The 116th flew the F-15 for the next ten years. The 116th Tactical Fighter Wing developed an impressive record of accomplishment and was awarded nine Air Force Outstanding Unit Awards.

=== B-1B Lancer ===
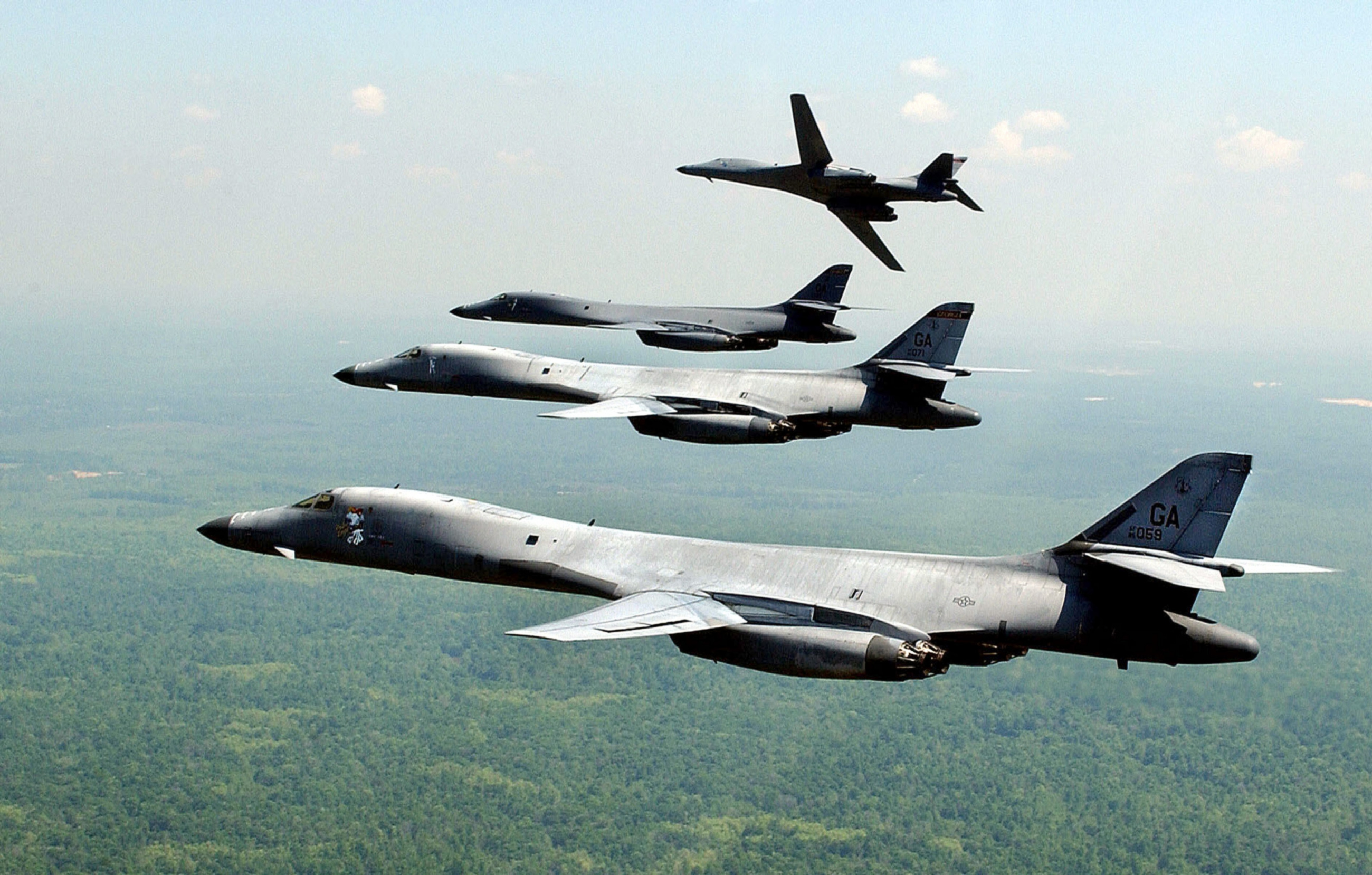
Four U.S. Air Force Rockwell B-1B Lancer from the 128th Bomb Squadron, 19 April 2002

In 1992 as part of the post Cold War reorganizations of the Air Force, the 116th converted to the Air Force Objective organization and the 128th was assigned to the reactivated 116th Operations Group. In 1992 Tactical Air Command was inactivated and the 116th was assigned to the new Air Combat Command (ACC).

After calling Dobbins home for 50 years, the 116th was presented with a new challenge in 1996. The wing simultaneously converted from the F-15 Eagle fighters to the Rockwell B-1 Lancer strategic bomber and moved 110 miles south to Robins Air Force Base near Warner Robins, Georgia. As part of the post Cold-War drawdown, the active-duty fleet of B-1Bs were being reduced for budget reductions and being taken off alert status by the former Strategic Air Command.

Having to make the most of the available facilities, including the former Strategic Air Command alert facility at Robins, the 116th Bomb Wing was quickly up and running and participated in a number of deployments and exercises around the world in the B-1B.

=== Airborne Command and Control ===
Due to fiscal constraints, in 2002 the USAF agreed to reduce its fleet of B-1Bs from 92 to 60 aircraft, to include removing all B-1 aircraft assigned to the Air National Guard. The 116th Bomb Wing, having older aircraft was ordered to send its aircraft to "active storage" which meant that they could be quickly returned to service should circumstances dictate. Its first B-1B was flown to storage at Davis-Monthan Air Force Base, Arizona on 20 August.

Under the Air Force's Total Force Initiative as a "blended" wing, the former 93d Air Control Wing, an active-duty Air Combat Command unit, and the 116th Bomb Wing, a Georgia Air National Guard unit, were inactivated effective 1 October 2002.

The 116th was immediately re-activated and redesignated as the 116th Air Control Wing. The 116th was a blend of active-duty and national guard airmen in a single unit. The wing was equipped with the new E-8C Joint STARS airborne battle management aircraft. Its mission is command and control, intelligence, surveillance and reconnaissance. Its primary mission is to provide theater ground and air commanders with ground surveillance to support attack operations and targeting that contributes to the delay, disruption and destruction of enemy forces. The E-8C evolved from Army and Air Force programs to develop, detect, locate and attack enemy armor at ranges beyond the forward area of troops.

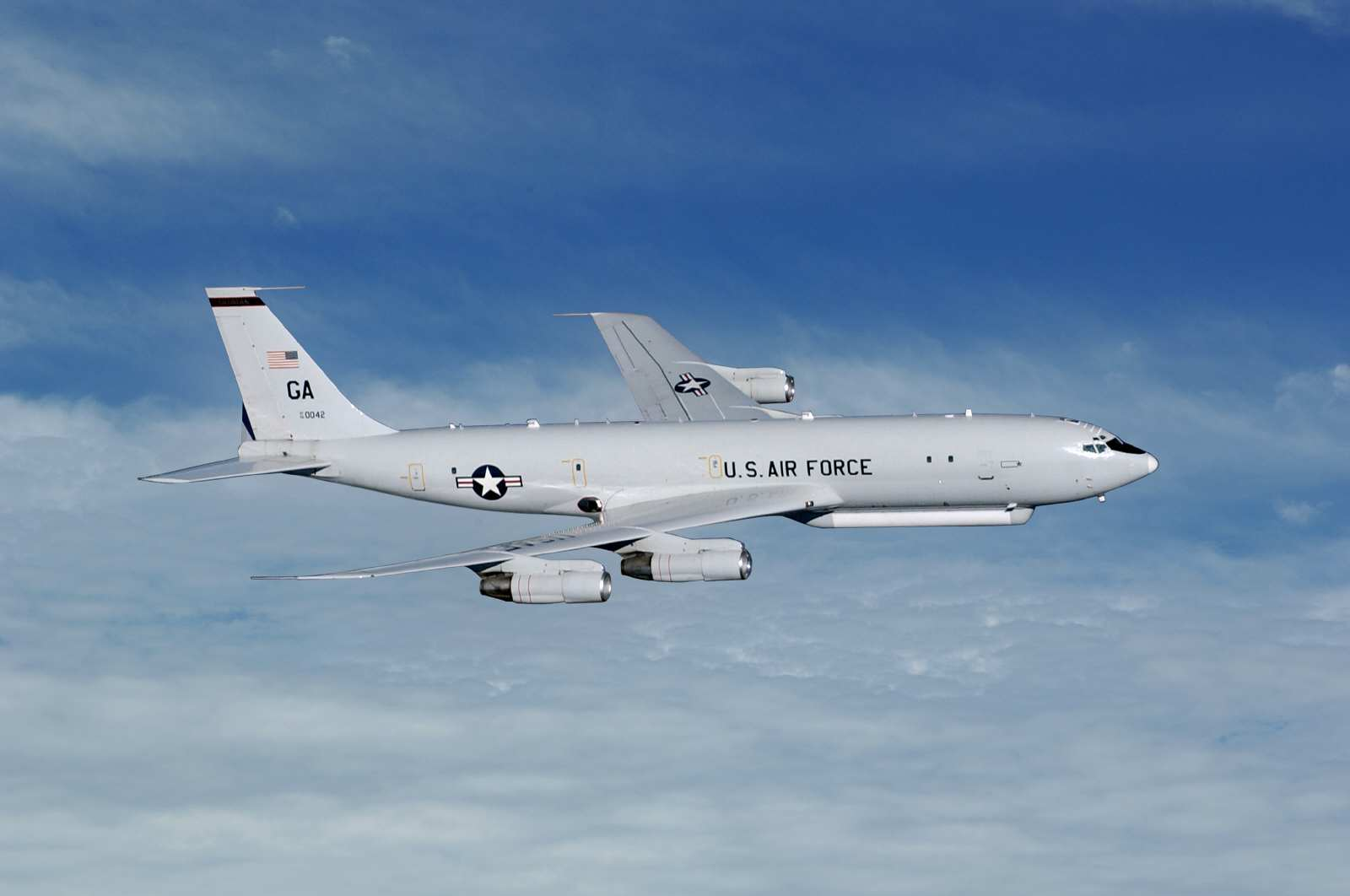
116th ACW E-8C Joint STARS, AF Ser. No. 96-0004

In 2006, the National Guard Bureau conducted a facility assessment and determined that the 116th CES was residing in the second worst engineering compound in the Air National Guard. This led to another building being identified for the squadron's new compound, and funding being appropriated for a concept study on how to adapt the facility for CES' needs.

In April 2010, The 116th Air Control Wing became the first ever Georgia Air National Guard unit to send a team to the Mountain Man Memorial March, held in Gatlinburg, Tennessee to honor those who have fallen in combat. The wing team sponsored Capt Dixon L. Walters, who was shot down over Kuwait on 31 January 1991.

The 128th Airborne Command and Control Squadron has flown more than 82,000 combat hours in support of Operation Enduring Freedom, Operation Iraqi Freedom, Operation New Dawn Operation Odyssey Dawn, and Operation Unified Protector. Beginning in 2011, its operational resume expanded to include support of five Combatant Commands including U.S. Pacific Command, U.S. Northern Command and U.S. Southern Command.

On 24 November 2010, the Chief of Staff of the Air Force Designated the 116th Air Control Wing as an "Active Associate" wing and reorganized the "blended" wing concept. As a result of this reorganization, a new active duty associate wing was formed. The structure is an association of the Georgia Air Guard's 116th Wing and the active duty 461st Air Control Wing. They will continue to operate together to accomplish the shared J-STARS mission by integrating Air Guard and active duty personnel to the maximum extent possible in groups, squadrons, and shops. The Active Association model is one in which a reserve component (the Air Guard) has principal responsibility for the weapon system that it shares with one or more Active Duty Units.

On 1 October 2011 the 116th Air Control Wing was inactivated as a Joint Air National Guard/United States Air Force Unit. Reasons cited were that updated Air Force regulations did not cover the blended unit, leading to anomalies in how promotions, disciplinary actions and other administrative issues were handled, according to the Air Force. The 116th was returned to the sole jurisdiction of the Georgia Air National Guard that same day, and reactivated. The unit's 17 J-STARS aircraft remained under the control of the Georgia Air National Guard, though the active duty pilots continue to fly with their Guard counterparts.

== Lineage ==
- Constituted as the 116th Fighter-Bomber Wing on 25 October 1950

Activated on 1 November 1950
Inactivated on 10 July 1952
Redesignated: 116th Fighter-Interceptor Wing and allotted to the Air National Guard on 10 July 1952
Redesignated 116th Fighter-Bomber Wing on 1 December 1952
Redesignated 116th Fighter-Interceptor Wing on 1 July 1955
Redesignated 116th Air Defense Wing on 15 April 1956
Redesignated 116th Air Transport Wing on 1 April 1961
Redesignated 116th Military Airlift Wing on 1 January 1966
Redesignated 116th Tactical Fighter Wing on 4 April 1973
Redesignated 116th Fighter Wing on 15 March 1992
Redesignated 116th Bomb Wing on 1 April 1996
Redesignated 116th Air Control Wing 1 October 2002
Inactivated on 1 October 2011
Activated on 1 October 2011

== Assignments ==
- Tactical Air Command, 10 October 1950 – 10 July 1952

Under operational control of Fifth Air Force, 1 August 1951 – 10 July 1952

- Georgia Air National Guard, 10 July 1952 – present

Gained by: Tactical Air Command
Gained by: Air Defense Command, 1 July 1955
Gained by: Military Air Transport Service, 1 April 1961
Gained by: Military Airlift Command, 1 January 1966
Gained by: Tactical Air Command, 4 April 1973
Gained by: Air Combat Command, 1 June 1992 – 1 October 2011; 1 October 2011 – present

== Components ==
Groups

- 116th Fighter-Bomber Group (later 116th Fighter-Interceptor Group, 116th Air Transport Group, 116th Military Airlift Group, 116th Tactical Fighter Group, 116th Operations Group), 1 November 1952 – 20 July 1952, 20 July 1952 – 9 December 1974, 15 March 1992 – 1 October 2011, 1 October 2011 – present

Squadrons

- 128th Tactical Fighter Squadron (later 128th Bomb Squadron, 128th Airborne Command and Control Squadron), 9 December 1974 – 15 March 1992

== Stations ==
- George Air Force Base, California, 1 November 1950 – 10 July 1952
- Misawa Air Base, Japan, 1 August 1951 – 10 July 1952 (operated from Taegu Air Base (K-2), South Korea, 2 December 1950 – 4 January 1952; 26 May 1952 – 10 July 1952)
- Dobbins Air Force Base, (Later Dobbins Air Reserve Base), Georgia, 10 July 1952
- Robins Air Force Base, Georgia, 1 April 1996 – present

== Aircraft ==
- Lockheed F-80 Shooting Star, 1950
- Republic F-84G Thunderjet, 1950–1952
- North American F-51H Mustang, 1952
- Republic F-84D Thunderjet, 1952–1955
- Republic F-84F Thunderstreak, 1955–1960
- North American F-86L Sabre, 1960–1961
- Boeing C-97F Stratofreighter, 1961–1965
- Douglas C-124C Globemaster II, 1965–1973
- North American F-100D Super Sabre, 1973–1979
- Republic F-105G Thunderchief, 1979–1983
- McDonnell F-4D Phantom II, 1982–1987
- McDonnell Douglas F-15A Eagle, 1986–1996
- Rockwell B-1B Lancer, 1996–2002
- E-8C Joint STARS, 2002–2023.
