= Isaac D. Wilcox =

American politician

Member of the Illinois House of Representatives
- In office 1818–1820

Isaac D. Wilcox was an American politician who served as a member of the Illinois House of Representatives.

He was a signatory of the First Illinois Constitutional Convention. He served as a state representative representing Johnson County in the 1st Illinois General Assembly.
