= 1st Illinois General Assembly =

Term of state legislature in Illinois, US

Type
- Type: Bicameral
- Houses: Senate House of Representatives

Leadership
- President of the Senate: Pierre Menard, Independent
- Speaker of the House of Representatives: John Messinger, Independent
- Seats: 14 Senators; 28 Representatives

Meeting place
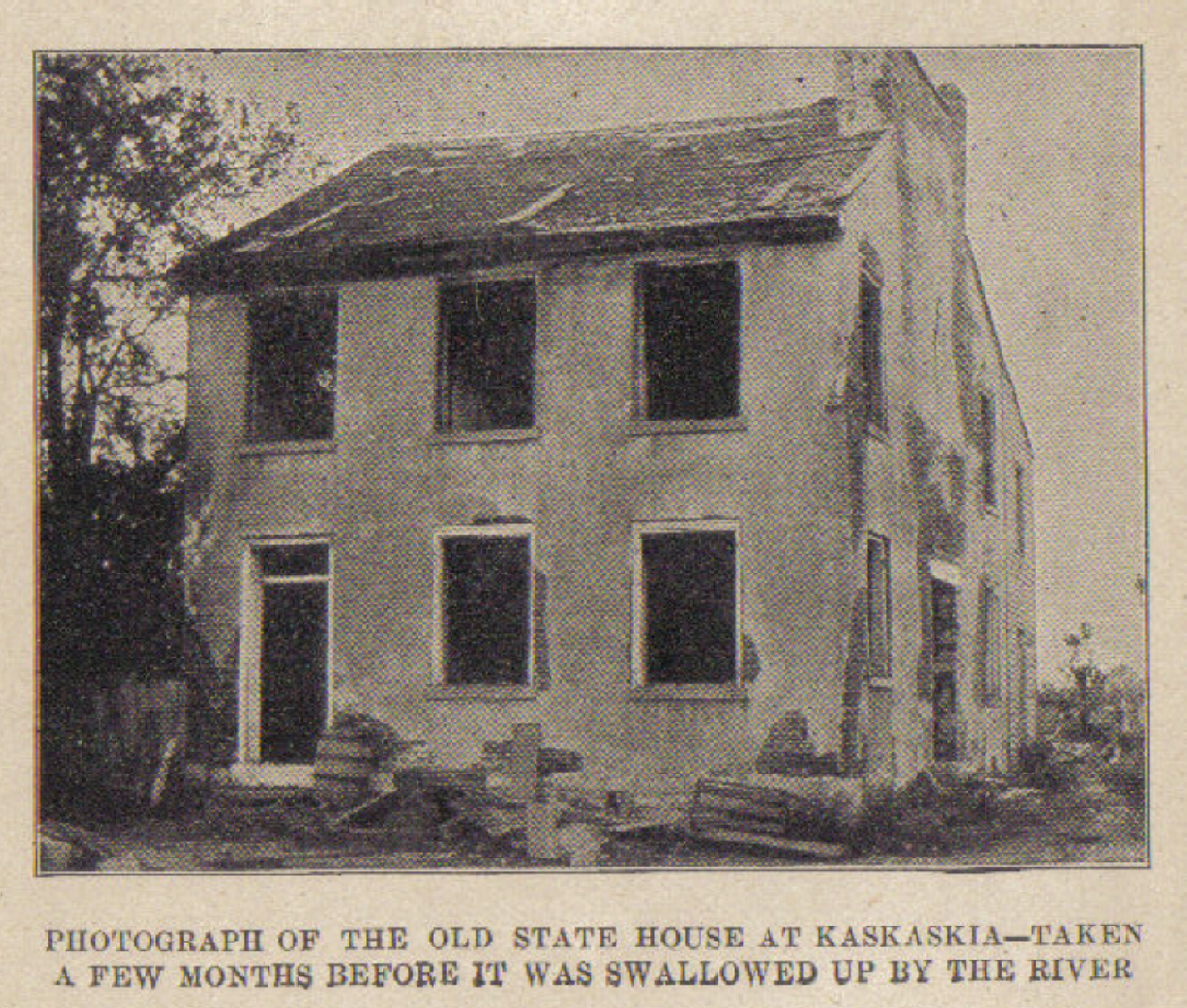
- Kaskaskia, Illinois

The 1st Illinois General Assembly, consisting of the Illinois State Senate and the Illinois House of Representatives, met from October 4, 1818, to March 31, 1819, during the 1st two years of Shadrach Bond's governorship, at The Kaskaskia State House. The apportionment of seats in the House of Representatives was based on the provisions of the First Illinois Constitution. Political parties were not established in the State at the time.

It was succeeded by the 2nd Illinois General Assembly.

== Members ==
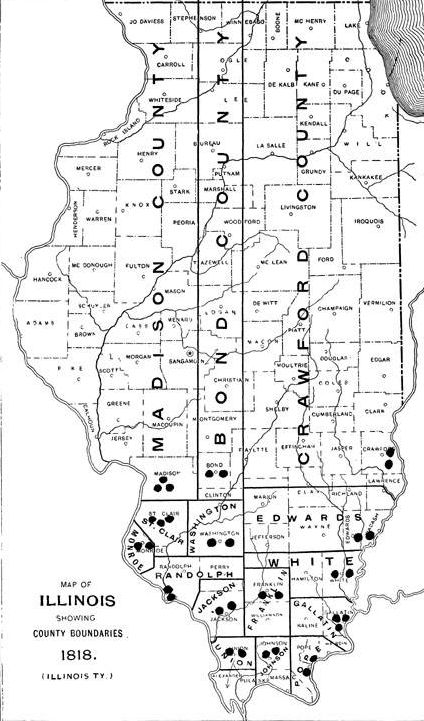
Map of Illinois Territory county boundaries in 1818

This list is arranged by chamber, then by county. Senators and Representatives were both allotted to counties roughly by population and elected at-large within their districts.

=== Senate ===
In accordance with the Constitution of 1818, the senators were divided by lot into two classes to retire in two and four years. The two-year group would therefore hold elections in 1820 (consisting of senators from Bond, St. Clair, Randolph, Jackson, Johnson/Franklin, White, and Edwards counties). Union County also held elections in 1820 despite being in the four year group.

County(ies) Represented	Image	Senator	Term	Remarks
Bond		Martin Jones	1818–1820	Unsuccessfully contested by his opponent Charles Johnson
Crawford		Joseph Kitchell	1818–1822	
Edwards		Guy W. Smith	1818–1820	
Gallatin		Michael Jones	1818–1822	
Jackson		Conrad Will	1818–1820	
Johnson • Franklin		Thomas Roberts	1818–1820	
Madison		George Cadwell	1818–1822	
Monroe		Alexander Jamison	1818–1822	
Pope		Lewis Barker	1818–1822	
St. Clair		William Kinney	1818–1820	
Randolph		John McFerron	1818–1820	Resigned July 8, 1819
Union		Thomas Cox	1818–1820	
Washington		Zariah Maddux	1818–1822	
White		Willis Hargrave	1818–1820	

=== House of Representatives ===
Seats in County	Counties represented	Image	Representative	Remarks
1	Bond		Francis Kirkpatrick	
2	Crawford		David Porter	
2	Crawford		Scott Riggs	
2	Edwards		Levi Compton	
2	Edwards		Henry Utter	
1	Franklin		Elijah Ewing	
3	Gallatin		John G. Daimwood	succeeded John Marshall
3	Gallatin		Samuel McClintock	
3	Gallatin		Adolphus F. Hubbard	
3	Gallatin		John Marshall	resigned, succeeded by John G. Daimwood
1	Jackson		Jesse Griggs	
1	Johnson		Isaac D. Wilcox	
3	Madison		John Howard	
3	Madison		Abraham Prickett	
3	Madison		Samuel Whiteside	
1	Monroe		William Alexander	
2	Pope		Green B. Field	
2	Pope		Robert Hamilton	
3	St. Clair		John Messinger	
3	St. Clair		Risdon Moore	
3	St. Clair		James D. Thomas	
2	Randolph		Edward Humphreys	
2	Randolph		Samuel Walker	
2	Union		Jesse Echols	
2	Union		Samuel Whiteacre	
1	Washington		Daniel S. Swearengen	
3	White		William McHenry	
3	White		William Nash	
3	White		Alexander Phillips	

== Employees ==
=== Senate ===
- Secretary: William C. Greenup
- Doorkeeper: Ezra Owen

=== House of Representatives ===
- Clerk: Thomas Reynolds
- Enrolling and Engrossing Clerk: Timothy Davis
- Assistant Enrolling and Engrossing Clerk: Milton Ladd
- Doorkeeper: Charles McNabb

== See also ==
- List of Illinois state legislatures
