= Abraham Prickett =

American politician

Member of the Illinois House of Representatives
- In office 1818–1820

Abraham Prickett was an American politician who served as a member of the Illinois House of Representatives.

He was a signatory of the First Illinois Constitutional Convention in 1818. He served as a state representative representing Madison County in the 1st Illinois General Assembly.
