= Guy W. Smith =

American politician

Member of the Illinois House of Representatives
- In office 1842–1844

Member of the Illinois Senate
- In office 1818–1820
- Succeeded by: Robert Frazier

Guy W. Smith was an American politician who served as a member of the Illinois Senate and the Illinois House of Representatives. He served as a state senator representing Edwards County in the 1st Illinois General Assembly. He later served as a state representative for Crawford County and Jasper County in the 13th Illinois General Assembly.
