= Robert Hamilton (Illinois politician) =

American politician

Member of the Illinois House of Representatives
- In office 1818–1820

Robert Hamilton was an American politician who served as a member of the Illinois House of Representatives. He served as a state representative representing Pope County in the 1st Illinois General Assembly.
