= William Alexander (Illinois politician) =

American politician

Member of the Illinois House of Representatives
- In office 1818–1820
- Succeeded by: Enoch Moore

Member of the Illinois House of Representatives
- In office 1822–1824

William Alexander was an American politician who served as a member of the Illinois House of Representatives. He served as a state representative representing Monroe County in the 1st Illinois General Assembly and the 3rd Illinois General Assembly.
