= George Fisher (Illinois pioneer) =

American physician

George Fisher (died 1820) was an American pioneer, physician, and legislator.

Fisher settled in Kaskaskia, Indiana Territory in 1798 and practiced medicine. Fisher may have been from Virginia. He served in the Illinois Territorial Militia during the War of 1812. In 1805, Fisher served in the Indiana Territorial House of Representatives. In 1812 and 1816, he served in and was speaker of the Illinois Territorial House of Representatives, representing Randolph County, Illinois, where Kaskaskia is located. In 1818, Fisher served in the first Illinois Constitutional Convention. The Indiana Territory Governor William H. Harrison appointed Fisher sheriff of Randolph County in 1801. He died in 1820 in Randolph County, Illinois. Fisher is buried on St. Leo's Road eight miles below Ruma in Randolph County.
