= John G. Daimwood =

American politician

Member of the Illinois House of Representatives
- In office 1822–1824

Member of the Illinois House of Representatives
- In office 1818–1820

John G. Daimwood was an American politician who served as a member of the Illinois House of Representatives.

He served as a judge in Gallatin County; and then as a state representative for Gallatin County in the 1st Illinois General Assembly after succeeding John Marshall, also of Gallatin County, who resigned. He went on to serve as Gallatin County's first treasurer; and then again as a representative in the 3rd Illinois General Assembly.
