= Andrew Bankson =

American politician

Member of the Illinois Senate
- In office 1822–1826

Member of the Iowa Legislative Assembly
- In office 1838–1839

Personal details
- Born: April 14, 1787 North Carolina
- Died: July 13, 1851 (aged 64) Highland, Iowa County, Wisconsin

Andrew Bankson was an American soldier and politician in early Illinois and Iowa.

== Life ==
Bankson was born in North Carolina. He and his parents were in Illinois by 1808, when he married Elizabeth Moore in St. Clair County, Illinois. In the War of 1812 he enlisted as a private and rose to be a 2nd lieutenant. In 1817 to 1818 he served in the Illinois territorial militia, briefly bearing the rank of colonel. During this time he was Washington County, Illinois's delegate to the First Illinois Constitutional Convention and served on the framing committee. He served as a state senator representing Washington County in the 3rd and 4th Illinois General Assemblies.

Having received a land grant across the Mississippi, Bankson moved there in 1836, in what was the Wisconsin Territory, in 1838 to become the Iowa Territory. In 1838 he was elected to the Iowa territorial legislature representing Dubuque County, Iowa. He later was elected county commissioner there.
