= George Cadwell =

American politician

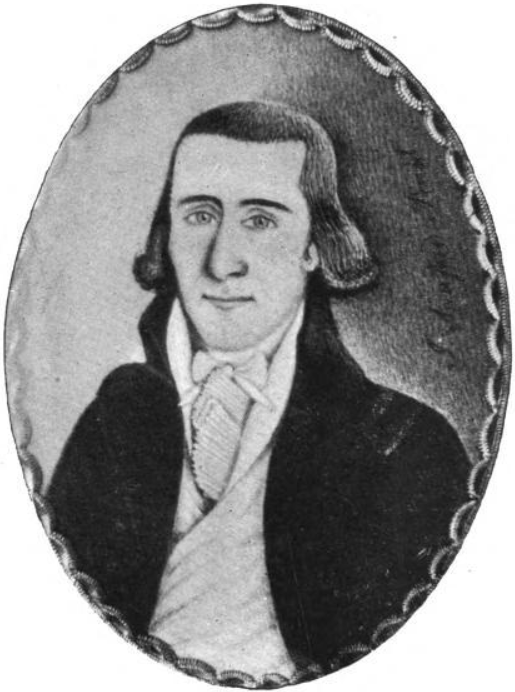

Member of the Illinois Senate from the Madison County district
- In office 1818 – 1822
- Preceded by: Inaugural Holder
- Succeeded by: Redistricted

Member of the Illinois Senate from the Greene & Pike Counties district
- In office 1822 – 1824
- Preceded by: Inaugural Holder

Personal details
- Born: February 21, 1773 Wethersfield, Connecticut
- Died: August 1, 1826 (aged 53) Morgan County, Illinois
- Profession: Physician

George Cadwell (February 21, 1773 – August 1, 1826) was an American pioneer, politician, and medical doctor from Connecticut. After Cadwell studied medicine in Vermont, he married a daughter of Matthew Lyon. He left with Lyon to Kentucky, but then settled in the Indiana Territory after a dispute about slavery. He served in the government of Madison County, then was elected to the Illinois Senate when the state was founded in 1818. He served three two-year terms, then resumed the practice of medicine.

== Biography ==
George Cadwell was born on February 21, 1773, in Wethersfield, Connecticut. He attended school in Hartford, Connecticut, and then studied medicine in Rutland, Vermont. Cadwell married Pamelia Lyon, the daughter of Matthew Lyon in 1797. He settled with her family in Fair Haven, Vermont. He helped her father publish The Scourge of Aristocracy and Repository of Important Political Truth, a paper attacking U.S. president John Adams. The Alien and Sedition Acts forced the family to flee the state, and in 1799, they settled at what is now Eddyville, Kentucky. Matthew Lyon became a prosperous slave trader, which disappointed the anti-slavery Cadwell and his brother-in-law John Messinger.

Messinger and Cadwell left Lyon in 1802 to settle in the Indiana Territory. Cadwell purchased 200 acres (81 ha) opposite Gaboret Island on the Mississippi River, about 9.5 miles (15.3 km) north of Cahokia, in what is now St. Clair County, Illinois. He built a cabin, farmed, and practiced medicine. Cadwell was appointed a justice of the peace for St. Clair County on July 9, 1809. When Madison County, Illinois Territory was created in 1812, which included his farm, Cadwell was named a justice for that county. In August 1813, he was named commissioner of the county court of common pleas, responsible for managing taxes. That December, he was appointed judge of the same court. The next December, he was appointed Judge of the Madison County Court.

Cadwell then moved to Edwardsville after purchasing land from Thomas Kirkpatrick. After Illinois was admitted as a state in 1818, Cadwell was elected to the 1st Illinois General Assembly as a state senator. In December 1820, he was named President pro tempore of the senate after Lieutenant Governor Pierre Menard requested a leave of absence. He resigned the next month. He was re-elected in 1820 and moved near what is now Lynnville, at the time still a part of Madison County. During this session, Greene County, Illinois, was created. Cadwell's farm now stood in the new county, so he represented it when elected to the next general assembly. He was also considered a representative of the new Pike County.

After the 3rd General Assembly, Cadwell purchased a 240-acre (97 ha) plot of land in Morgan County. The land was largely timbered and Cadwell harvested sugar and syrup until the 1850s. He platted part of his claim as the town of Quincy, hoping to secure the location of the county seat. However, the county commissioners instead settled on Jacksonville. Cadwell spent the rest of his practicing medicine as the first physician in Morgan County. He built the first frame house in the county and created the Morganian Society, an anti-slavery group. He was named the first postmaster in the county.

Cadwell had two sons and eight daughters; both sons died before adulthood. He died in Morgan County on August 1, 1826, and was buried in Diamond Grove Cemetery in Jacksonville. He was the great-grandfather of state senator Epler Cadwell Mills.
