= Daniel S. Swearengen =

American politician

Member of the Illinois House of Representatives
- In office 1818–1820

Daniel S. Swearengen was an American politician who served as a member of the Illinois House of Representatives. He served as a state representative representing Washington County in the 1st Illinois General Assembly.
