= Fair Haven Gazette =

Former newspaper in Vermont

The Fair Haven Gazette was a Vermont newspaper. It was published in the late 18th century; James Lyon (1776-1824) was the nominal owner and publisher, but the de facto owner and author of much of its content was Lyon's father Matthew Lyon.

== History ==
In the early years of Vermont statehood, there were two newspapers in circulation: the Bennington Gazette and the Windsor Journal.

Matthew Lyon was an early political, military, and business leader of Vermont. He founded the town of Fair Haven in 1783, and constructed and operated several businesses, including mills and forges.

Having been trained as a printer and bookbinder, in 1793 Lyon decided to create a newspaper as way to communicate his ideas to the voters; he had been an unsuccessful candidate for the United States House of Representatives in 1791 and 1792, and intended to run again in 1794. Lyon established a newspaper in Fair Haven; though his son James, also a printer and publisher, was the nominal owner, much of the paper's management was overseen by Matthew Lyon, and he authored much of the content. In addition to Matthew Lyon's articles, other stories and columns were prepared by James Lyon and Alden Spooner (1757-1827).

In 1794, James and Matthew Lyon sold the physical plant for the Fair Haven Gazette to Reverend Samuel Williams and Judge Samuel Williams of Rutland; they used these items to establish the Rutland Herald, a newspaper which has remained in circulation ever since.

== Legacy ==
Matthew Lyon failed to win a U.S. House seat in 1794; he was finally elected on his fourth attempt in 1796. As a way to continue communicating his Democratic-Republican ideas to his constituents and oppose the ideas of the Federalists, Matthew Lyon and James Lyon started a new paper, The Scourge Of Aristocracy and Repository of Important Political Truth.

In 1798, Matthew Lyon was found guilty of violating the Alien and Sedition Acts, based on anti-Adams administration comments he had made in the Scourge, and a letter to Alden Spooner; Spooner was now publisher of the Vermont Journal, and the letter appeared in his paper. Lyon was held in prison in Vergennes, Vermont; he won reelection to Congress in 1798 while he was incarcerated.

Lyon's prison term expired on February 9, 1799; he could not pay the fine which was part of his sentence, or the costs associated with his imprisonment. Political supporters raised the necessary funds, enabling him to be released and take up his seat in the House.

After failing to win reelection in 1800, Lyon moved to Kentucky, where he was involved in several business ventures and was again elected to Congress.

== Sources ==
=== Magazines ===
- Forbes, Charles S. (August 1, 1905). "History of Vermont Newspapers". The Vermonter. St. Albans, VT: C. S. Forbes. p. 24.

=== Books ===
- Lee, George R. (2005). U.S. History, Grades 6 - 8: People and Events: 1607-1865. Quincy, IL: Mark Twain Media, Inc. p. 45. ISBN 978-1-58037-757-7.
- McLaughlin, James Fairfax (1900). Matthew Lyon, the Hampden of Congress. New York, NY: Wynkoop Crawford Hallenbeck Company.
- Novotny, Patrick (2014). The Press in American Politics, 1787–2012. Santa Barbara, CA: ABC-CLIO. p. 21. ISBN 978-1-4408-3289-5.
