= John Marshall (Illinois politician) =

American politician

Member of the Illinois House of Representatives
- In office 1818–1820

John Marshall was an American politician who served as a member of the Illinois House of Representatives. He served as a state representative representing Gallatin County in the 1st Illinois General Assembly. He resigned before completing his term and was succeeded by John G. Daimwood also of Gallatin County.
