= Enoch Moore (politician) =

American politician

Member of the Illinois House of Representatives
- In office 1820–1822
- Preceded by: William Alexander
- Succeeded by: William Alexander

Personal details
- Born: 1782
- Died: 1848 (aged 65–66)

Enoch Moore was an American politician who served as a member of the Illinois House of Representatives.

Moore was born in Bellefontaine, Illinois (now known as Waterloo) in 1782, the son of Captain James Moore. He served as a ranger and then captain in the War of 1812. After returning to Illinois, he served a clerk of the Circuit Court and the judge of Probate in Monroe County. He was a member of the First Illinois Constitutional Convention in 1818.

He served as a state representative representing Monroe County in the 2nd Illinois General Assembly.

Moore died in 1848.
