= John Messinger =

American politician

John Messinger (January 4, 1771 – September 16, 1846) was an American pioneer, politician, teacher, and surveyor who was the first Speaker of the Illinois House of Representatives. Born in Massachusetts, Messinger was educated in Vermont and married the daughter of Matthew Lyon. He left with Lyon to Kentucky, but disagreed with his stance on slavery and came to the Indiana Territory in 1802. He served in the Indiana Territorial Legislature and advocated for the creation of the Illinois Territory. When the state of Illinois was created in 1818, he co-authored its constitution and served in its first General Assembly as Speaker of the House. Messinger was also a prominent surveyor, establishing what is now the state line between Illinois and Wisconsin on behalf of the U.S. government.

== Biography ==
John Messinger was born in West Stockbridge, Massachusetts, on January 4, 1771. In 1783, his family moved to Vermont. There, Messinger attained an education and showed skill with mathematics. He held a number of jobs in Vermont including carpenter, builder, teacher, mill-wright, and farmer. He married Anne Lyon, a daughter of Col. Matthew Lyon, a member of the United States House of Representatives. At the time, Lyon was being persecuted via the Alien and Sedition Acts so he decided to move, with Messinger, to Kentucky near the mouth of the Cumberland River. Lyon became a prosperous slave trader, but this irked anti-slavery Messinger and his brother-in-law George Cadwell. Cadwell and Messenger moved to the Indiana Territory in 1802, settling near New Design in what is now Monroe County, Illinois.

Messinger operated a gristmill on Rockhouse Creek. He moved to Clinton Hill in 1806, where he lived for the rest of his life. Messinger's education was appreciated by his fellow pioneers, particularly for his surveying skills. Aside from the mill, Messinger worked as a teacher, cartographer, carpenter, cabinetmarker, and farmer. He surveyed most of St. Clair and Madison Counties. He was also commissioned to survey the military land between the Illinois and Mississippi Rivers. With Philip Creamer, Messinger opened a shop manufacturing surveyors' compasses.

Messinger served in the Indiana Territorial legislature in 1808 and advocated for the creation of the Illinois Territory. He was named postmaster of Clinton Hill the next year. Messinger was considered a leading citizen of Illinois when the state was organized in 1818. He represented Illinois when the state line with the Territory of Michigan was formed, now the state line with Wisconsin. He was appointed a delegate to the first constitutional convention, making him a co-author of the Constitution of Illinois. He was then elected to the Illinois House of Representatives for the 1st Illinois General Assembly, where he also served as the first Speaker of the House. The two-year term was the last political office he held.

He published A Manual or Handbook of Practical Surveying in 1821. Messinger became a mathematics teacher at John Mason Peck's Rock Spring seminary in 1827. He fought in the Black Hawk War.

Messinger died on September 16, 1846. He was buried in Messinger Cemetery in Swansea, Illinois.
