= Illinois Constitution of 1818 =

Constitution of the US state of Illinois

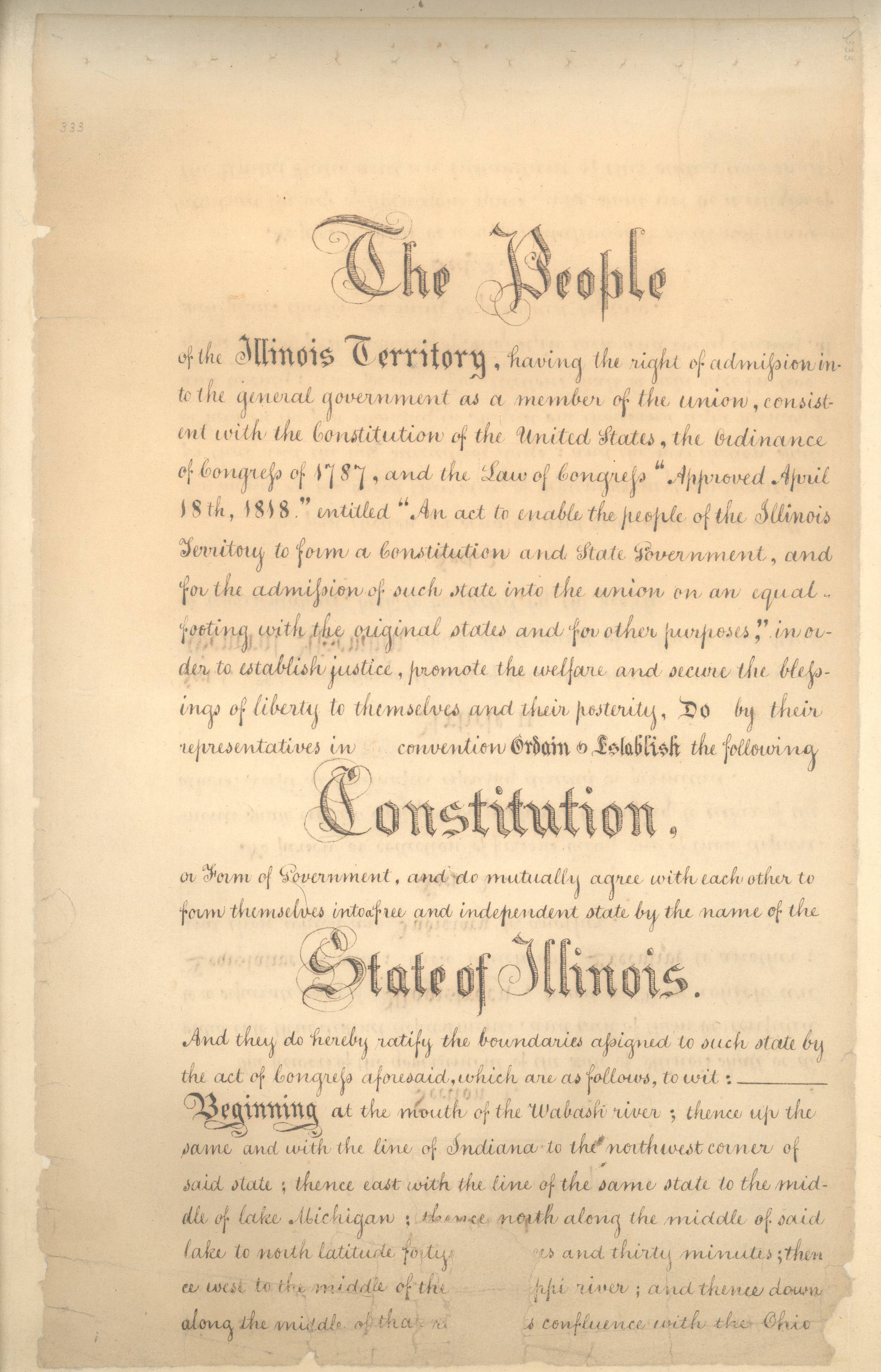
- Page 1 of the 1818 constitution

Overview
- Jurisdiction: Illinois
- Presented: September 3, 1970

Government structure
- Branches: 3
- Chambers: Bicameral
- Executive: Governor
- Judiciary: Supreme Court, Appellate Court, and circuit courts
- Author: First Illinois Constitutional Convention
- Superseded by: Illinois Constitution of 1848

The Illinois Constitution of 1818 was the first state constitution of Illinois, enacted after in August 1818 and adopted on August 26, 1818, during the First Illinois Constitutional Convention in Kaskaskia, Illinois. It was succeeded by the Illinois Constitution of 1848.
