= The Odyssey (Emily Wilson translation) =

2017 translation by Emily Wilson

- First edition cover
- Author: Emily Wilson
- Publisher: W. W. Norton & Company
- Publication date: 7 November 2017
- Pages: 656
- ISBN: 978-0-393-65506-3

The Odyssey is a 2017 translation of Homer's Odyssey, an ancient Greek epic poem, by British-American classicist Emily Wilson. It was published by W. W. Norton & Company. Wilson's translation is the first complete published translation of the poem into English by a woman.

Wilson, a professor at the University of Pennsylvania, preserved the original Homeric Greek's line count and reflected its traditional dactylic hexameter by employing the traditional English iambic pentameter. Her translation uses simple syntax in modern English.

Critical reception was largely positive. Charlotte Higgins described it as a "cultural landmark". Reviewers praised Wilson's fresh interpretation and her representation of the poem's female characters. Many critics said Wilson's translation corrected anachronistic or euphemistic language used by other translators. The language and storytelling were commended and its meter was widely described as musical. Some critics highlighted the poem's accessibility compared to previous translations while others felt Wilson deviated too far from the original text.

== Background ==
Classicist Emily Wilson was born in 1971 in Oxford, England, to a family of scholars. As of 2017, she is a professor of classics at the University of Pennsylvania. Wilson completed her undergraduate degree in literae humaniores at the University of Oxford in 1994, a master's degree in English Renaissance literature at Corpus Christi College, Oxford in 1996, and a Ph.D. in classical and comparative literature at Yale University in 2001.

=== Composition and approach ===
Wilson spent five or six years working on the translation. Her translation maintains the 12,110 lines of the original poem and matches them line for line. Wilson rejected a standard set by Alexander Pope in his 18th-century translation (1725–26) that the tone be "grand, ornate, rhetorically elevated". She has said this is not present in the original and emphasized simple, readable language in her own work. She selected iambic pentameter because it is "the conventional metre for English verse", citing the work of Chaucer, Shakespeare, Milton, Byron and Keats. Classicist Gregory Hayes noted her approach echoes that of Matthew Arnold in the nineteenth century.

Her primary goals were to use a traditional meter, preserve the length and pace of the original, and make characters sound distinct when the translation was read aloud. Like most modern translators, she employs less repetition of phrases or words than does the original text.

Wilson's introduction covers the dating, cultural context and authorship of the poem, alongside briefly outlining the approach of previous translations. She also discusses some of her translational choices; the poem's first description of Odysseus as polytropos (transl. "many turning" or "much turning") could mean Odysseus as passive (he is being turned) or active (he is "turning" other subjects). Wilson translates this as "a complicated man". In another extract, she describes Penelope's hand as "muscular" because the original Greek pachus (transl. thick) associated Penelope's craft with the "physical competence" of male warriors. Wilson retains the Homeric Greek's characterisation of Penelope as talented at word play, a trait associated with Odysseus himself, which has been omitted by some translators, such as Fitzgerald.

Wilson's publisher strongly promoted the translation as the first into English by a woman. Previous translations by women into other languages included Anne Dacier's 1708 French prose translation; alongside her preface, her translation influenced the 18th-century translation by Alexander Pope. Wilson's translation was published two years after Caroline Alexander became the first female translator of the Iliad into English.

== Reception ==
The New York Times Magazine praised the translation's "radically contemporary voice". Charlotte Higgins described Wilson's work as a "cultural landmark" that "exposes centuries of masculinist translations". Poet and translator Josephine Balmer agreed in New Statesman that previous translations had been "firmly male". NPR's Annalisa Quinn describes the translation as progressivist, excising "centuries of verbal ideological buildup", citing previous translators' additions of Christianisation, sexism, and Victorian euphemisms. In a review for London Review of Books, Colin Burrow described Wilson as a "moderniser", particularly highlighting her translations of epithets into phrases that provide "running commentary on emotional and social relationships". Additionally, he stated the immense challenges posed by retaining the same number of lines as the original.

It was praised as an accessible introduction to the poem, with critics highlighting its plain use of language. Balmer calls Wilson a "careful and creative scholar" whose translation rejects the notion that ancient epics can only be translated by established poets. Madeline Miller, who partially retells the Odyssey in Circe (2018), praised the translation for retaining "Homer's speed and narrative drive". Miller and Quinn highlight Wilson's inclusion of the word slave, which has traditionally been translated as maids or servants. Essayist Wyatt Mason reported being "floored" by Wilson's alliterative, musical, "natural" and "subtle" treatment of the poem's first lines.

Other scholars criticized Wilson's translation as a deviation from the content of the original. South African scholar Richard Whitaker wrote that "The two great novelties of Wilson's Odyssey are the way she represents a group of characters that we might term 'underdogs' – notably the Cyclops, and the suitors and their allies – in a sympathetic light, while representing Odysseus as, on balance, reprehensible. The big problem, however, with Wilson's heterodox approach to the characters of the Odyssey is that she can sustain it only by distorting and misrepresenting what the Greek text says." Whitaker argued that Wilson "makes no effort to overcome her obvious, and personal, but anachronistic, biases."

Wilson was the first woman to publish a complete translation of the Odyssey into English, although Barbara Leonie Picard produced an English prose retelling for children in 1952. In 2019, Wilson said the media's emphasis on this presented her as "unique in a way [she is] not unique"; she highlighted other female scholars of Homer and that women had translated the poem into languages other than English before.

Online commentators objected to the simpler, more modern language Wilson used, deriding her as "woke". John Semley at Wired characterized the various controversies as part of a broader online culture war. Following a period of online harassment, Wilson deleted her X account in 2024.

== Upcoming retranslation ==
In a podcast recorded in spring 2026, (Note: Wilson's decision to retranslate The Odyssey predates her high-profile criticism of Christopher Nolan's film The Odyssey (2026).) Wilson discussed the possibility of retranslating The Odyssey, stating that she would probably keep the opening line "Tell me about a complicated man", but replace the overuse of the word "slave" with more precise terminology. The retranslation is being done "from scratch" and not a revision of her previous translation. By September 2026, the retranslation was reportedly halfway complete.

== Bibliography ==
- Armstrong, Richard H. (2018). "Review of Homer: The Odyssey". Museum Helveticum. 75 (2): 225–226. JSTOR 26831950.
- Balmer, Josephine (21 January 2018). "Emily Wilson sensitively considers The Odyssey's original poetic purpose and resonance". New Statesman.
- Brady, Amy (16 January 2018). "How Emily Wilson Translated 'The Odyssey'". Chicago Review of Books.
- Burrow, Colin (26 April 2018). "Light through the Fog". London Review of Books. Vol. 40, no. 8.
- Foreman, Robert Long; Wortman, Stefanie (2024). "A Conversation with Emily Wilson". The Missouri Review. 47 (2): 166–181. doi:10.1353/mis.2024.a930776.
- Gibson, Richard Hughes (2019). "On Women Englishing Homer". Arion: A Journal of Humanities and the Classics. 26 (3): 35–68. doi:10.2307/arion.26.3.0035. ISSN 0095-5809. JSTOR arion.26.3.0035.
- Hays, Gregory (5 December 2017). "A Version of Homer That Dares to Match Him Line for Line". The New York Times. ProQuest 1972169508.
- Higgins, Charlotte (8 December 2017). "The Odyssey translated by Emily Wilson review – a new cultural landmark". The Guardian. ISSN 1756-3224.
- Loffhagen, Emma (1 September 2026). "Emily Wilson to retranslate the Odyssey from scratch". The Guardian. Archived from the original on 2 September 2026.
- Mason, Wyatt (2 November 2017). "The First Woman to Translate the 'Odyssey' Into English". Magazine. The New York Times. ProQuest 1958506497.
- Miller, Madeline (16 November 2017). "The first English translation of The Odyssey by a woman was worth the wait". The Washington Post. ProQuest 1965007480.
- North, Anna (20 November 2017). "Historically, men translated the Odyssey. Here's what happened when a woman took the job". Vox.
- Quinn, Annalisa (2 December 2017). "Emily Wilson's 'Odyssey' Scrapes The Barnacles Off Homer's Hull". NPR.
- Semley, John (23 June 2026). "The New Odyssey Movie Is Sparking a Right-Wing Backlash. This Female Scholar Knows It Well". Wired.
- Thurman, Judith (11 September 2023). "Mother Tongue: Emily Wilson Makes Homer Modern". The New Yorker. ProQuest 2873453619. Archived from the original on 11 September 2023.
- Whitaker, Richard (2020). "Homer's Odyssey Three Ways: Recent Translations by Verity, Wilson, and Green" (PDF). Acta Classica: Proceedings of the Classical Association of South Africa. 63 (1): 241–254. doi:10.1353/acl.2020.0013. ISSN 0065-1141. JSTOR 26945078.
- Wilde, Fran (3 May 2018). "All The Voices of The Odyssey: Emily Wilson On Language, Translation, and Culture". Reactor.
- Wilson, Emily R. (translator) (2018). The Odyssey. New York: W. W. Norton & Company. ISBN 978-0-393-08905-9.
- Wood, Robert (2 April 2019). "Emily Wilson on Porous Boundaries and the World of Homer". Los Angeles Review of Books.
