= Lamkin (disambiguation) =

Surname list

Lamkin is the surname of the following people

- John Tillman Lamkin (1811–1870), US confederate politician
- Phaedra Ellis-Lamkins (born 1976), American social justice advocate
- Patricia Ann Lamkin (1963–2018), American singer and playwright
- Speed Lamkin (1927–2011), American novelist and playwright
- Uel W. Lamkin (1877–1956), American university administrator

== See also ==
- Lamkin, Texas
- Lamkin, an English murder ballad
