= A Room of One's Own =

1929 essay by Virginia Woolf

- First edition cover
- Author: Virginia Woolf
- Cover artist: Vanessa Bell (first edition)
- Subject: Feminism, women, literature, education
- Publisher: Hogarth Press, England, Harcourt Brace & Co., United States
- Publication date: 28 September 1929
- Publication place: England
- Pages: 172 (Hogarth Press first edition)
- OCLC: 470314057
- Text: A Room of One's Own at Wikisource

A Room of One's Own is an extended essay by Virginia Woolf, first published in 1929. Divided into six chapters, the work is based on two lectures Woolf delivered in October 1928 at two women's colleges, Newnham College and Girton College, of the University of Cambridge.

The essay discusses a variety of topics and uses many metaphors and thought experiments to illustrate her points, particularly focusing on women's lack of free self-expression. Her metaphor of a fish explains her most essential point, "A woman must have money and a room of her own if she is to write fiction". She writes of a woman whose thought had "let its line down into the stream". As the woman starts to think of an idea, a guard enforces a rule whereby women are not allowed to walk on the grass. Abiding by the rule, the woman loses her idea.

== History ==
The essay was based on two papers Woolf read on 20 and 26 October 1928 to two Cambridge student societies, the Newnham Arts Society at Newnham College and the ODTAA Society ("One Damn Thing After Another") at Girton College, respectively. Elsie Duncan-Jones, then known as Elsie Phare, was the president of the Newnham Arts Society at the time and wrote an account of the paper, "Women and Fiction", for the college magazine, Thersites. Woolf stayed at Newnham at the invitation of Pernel Strachey, the college principal, whose family were key members of the Bloomsbury Group. At Girton she was accompanied by Vita Sackville-West. It was published in 1929 as a book with six chapters.

Although Three Guineas (1938) is a work of non-fiction, it was initially conceived as a "novel–essay" which would tie up the loose ends left in A Room of One's Own.

On 1 January 2025, A Room of One's Own entered the public domain in the United States.

== Themes ==
=== The Four Marys ===
The title of the essay comes from Woolf's conception that "a woman must have money and a room of her own if she is to write fiction". The narrator of the work is referred to early on: "Here then was I (call me Mary Beton, Mary Seton, Mary Carmichael or by any name you please—it is not a matter of any importance)". The two Marys were ladies-in-waiting to Mary, Queen of Scots; they – along with Mary Carmichael – are also characters in a 16th-century Scottish ballad, "Mary Hamilton", about a lady-in-waiting who is facing execution for having had a child with the King, a child she killed. (Note: "Yestreen the Queen had four Maries / This nicht she'll hae but three, O / There was Mary Beaton, and Mary Seaton / And Mary Carmichael, and me, O.")

=== Women's access to education ===
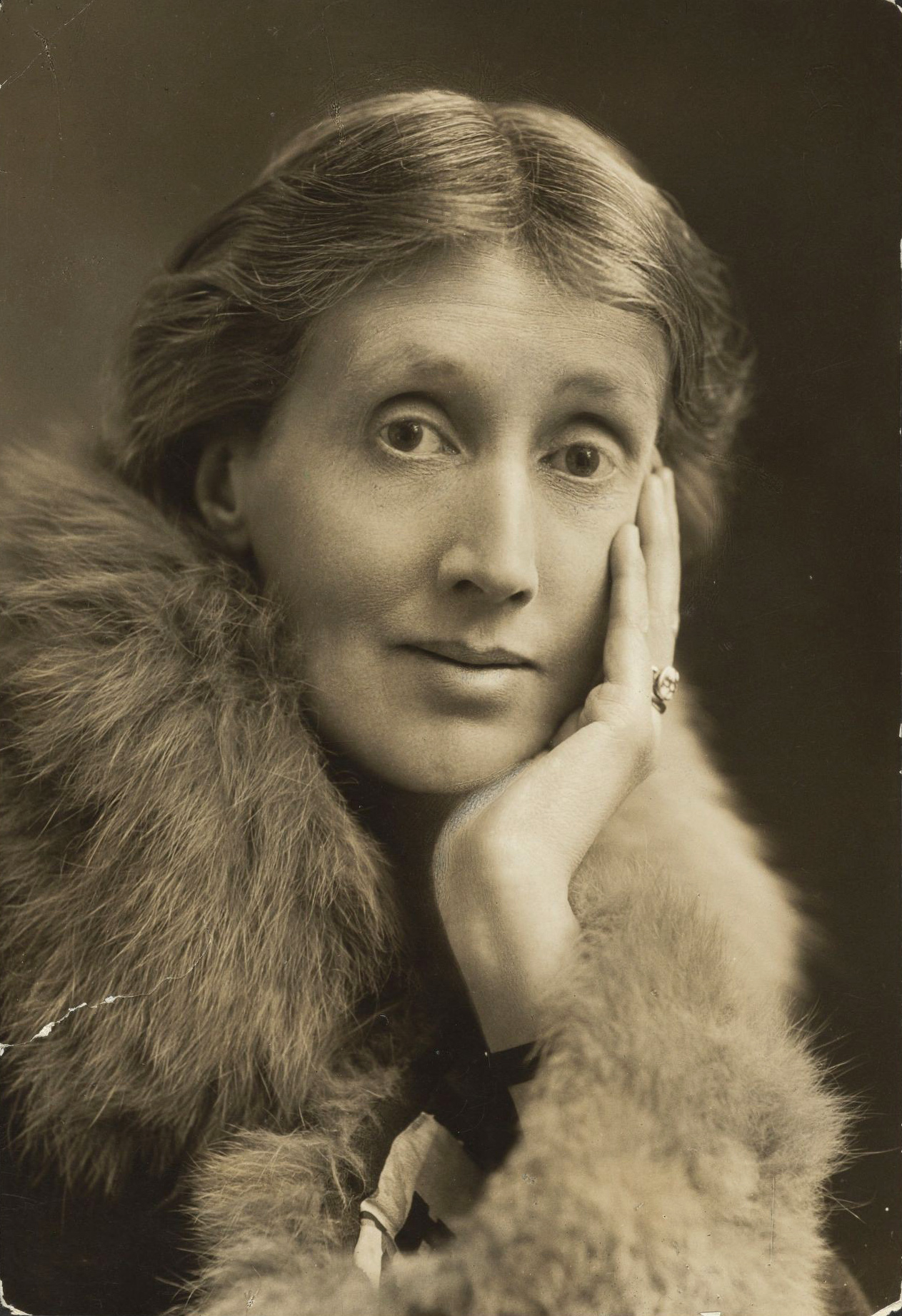
Woolf in 1927

The essay examines whether women were capable of producing, and in fact free to produce, work of the quality of William Shakespeare, addressing the limitations that past and present women writers face.

Woolf's father, Sir Leslie Stephen, in line with the thinking of the era, believed that only the boys of the family should be sent to school. In delivering the lectures outlined in the essay, Woolf is speaking to women who have the opportunity to learn in a formal setting. She moves her audience to understand the importance of their education, while warning them of the precariousness of their position in society. She sums up the stark contrast between how women are idealised in fiction written by men, and how patriarchal society has treated them in real life:

Women have burnt like beacons in all the works of all the poets from the beginning of time. Indeed if woman had no existence save in the fiction written by men, one would imagine her a person of the utmost importance; very various; heroic and mean; splendid and sordid; beautiful and hideous in the extreme; as great as a man, some would say greater. But this is woman in fiction. In fact, as Professor Trevelyan points out, she was locked up, beaten and flung about the room. A very queer, composite being thus emerges. Imaginatively she is of the highest importance; practically she is completely insignificant. She pervades poetry from cover to cover; she is all but absent from history. She dominates the lives of kings and conquerors in fiction; in fact she was the slave of any boy whose parents forced a ring upon her finger. Some of the most inspired words and profound thoughts in literature fall from her lips; in real life she could hardly read; scarcely spell; and was the property of her husband.

==== Judith Shakespeare ====
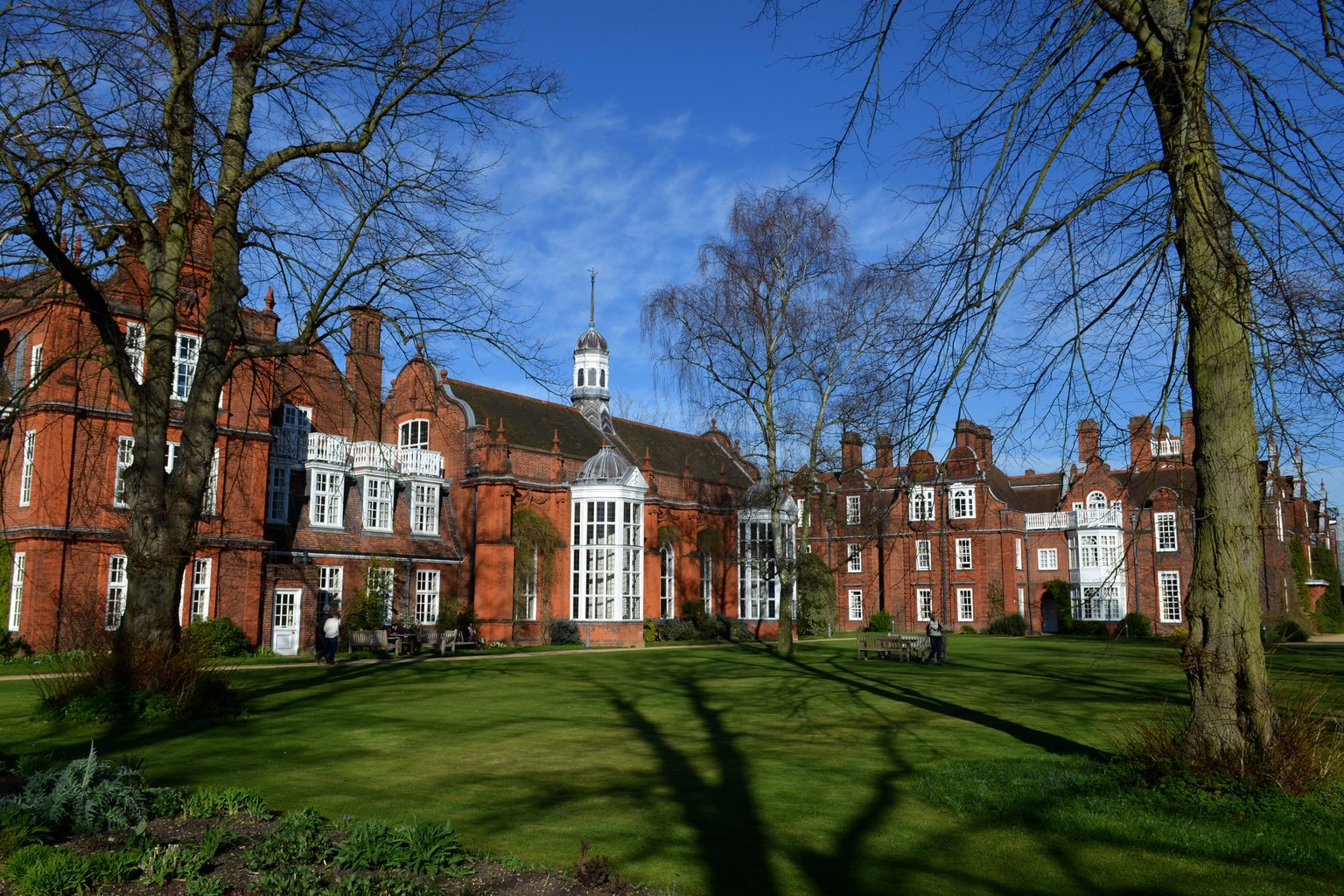
Newnham College, Cambridge

In section 3 Woolf invents a fictional character, Judith, Shakespeare's sister, to illustrate that a woman with Shakespeare's gifts would have been denied the opportunity to develop them. Like Woolf, who stayed at home while her brothers went off to school, Judith is trapped in the home: "She was as adventurous, as imaginative, as agog to see the world as he was. But she was not sent to school."

While William learns, Judith is chastised by her parents should she happen to pick up a book, as she is inevitably abandoning some household chore to which she could be attending. Judith is betrothed, and when she does not want to marry, her father beats her, then shames her into the marriage. While William establishes himself, Judith is trapped by what is expected of women. She runs away from home to London, is harassed and laughed at when she tries to become an actor, and is finally made pregnant by an actor-manager who said he would help her. She kills herself and "lies buried at some cross-roads where the omnibuses now stop outside the Elephant and Castle". William lives on and establishes his legacy.

=== Building a history of women's writing ===
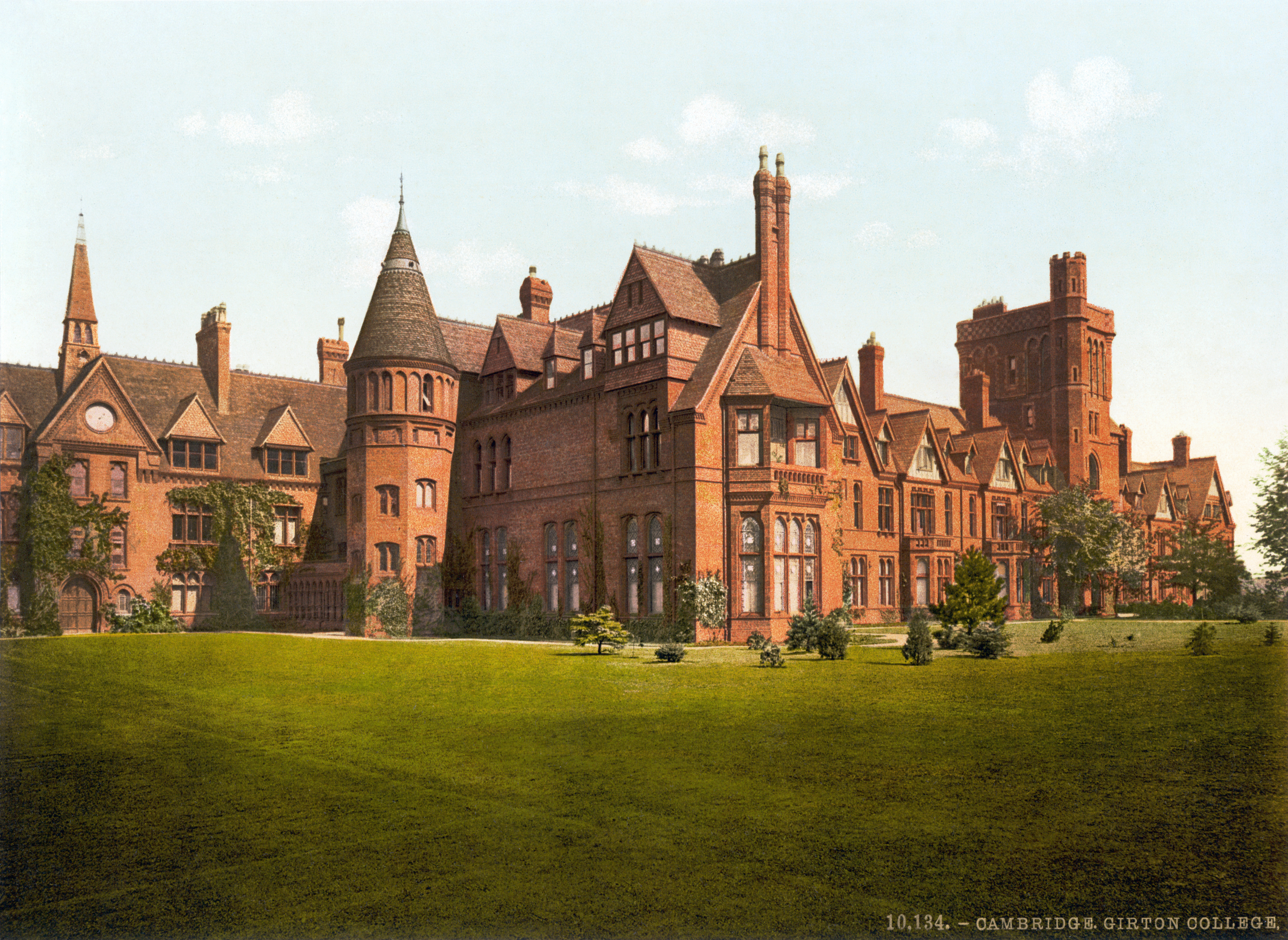
Girton College, Cambridge

In the essay, Woolf constructs a critical and historical account of women writers thus far. Woolf examines the careers of several female authors, including Aphra Behn, Jane Austen, the Brontë sisters, Anne Finch, Countess of Winchilsea, and George Eliot. In addition to female authors, Woolf also discusses and draws inspiration from noted scholar and feminist Jane Ellen Harrison. Harrison is presented in the essay only by her initials separated by long dashes, and Woolf first introduces Harrison as "the famous scholar, could it be J---- H---- herself?"

Woolf also discusses Rebecca West, questioning Desmond MacCarthy's (referred to as "Z") uncompromising dismissal of West as an "'arrant feminist'". Among the men attacked for their views on women, F. E. Smith, 1st Earl of Birkenhead (referred to as "Lord Birkenhead") is mentioned, although Woolf further rebukes his ideas in stating she will not "trouble to copy out Lord Birkenhead's opinion upon the writing of women". Birkenhead was an opponent of suffrage. The essay quotes Oscar Browning, through the words of his (possibly inaccurate) biographer H. E. Wortham, "that the impression left on his mind, after looking over any set of examination papers, was that, irrespective of the marks he might give, the best woman was intellectually the inferior of the worst man".

=== Lesbianism ===
Woolf wrote in her diary before A Room of One's Own was published that she thought when it was published she would be "attacked for a feminist & hinted at for a sapphist".

In one section of the book, describing the work of a fictional woman writer, Mary Carmichael, Woolf deliberately invokes lesbianism: "Then may I tell you that the very next words I read were these – 'Chloe liked Olivia ...' Do not start. Do not blush. Let us admit in the privacy of our own society that these things sometimes happen. Sometimes women do like women." Woolf references the obscenity trial and public uproar resulting from the publishing of Radclyffe Hall's lesbian-themed novel The Well of Loneliness (1928). Before she can discuss Chloe liking Olivia, the narrator has to be assured that Sir Chartres Biron, the magistrate of Hall's obscenity trial, is not in the audience: "Are there no men present? Do you promise the figure of Sir Chartres Biron is not concealed? We are all women, you assure me? Then I may tell you ..."

Woolf scholar and feminist critic Jane Marcus believes Woolf was giving Radclyffe Hall and other writers a demonstration of how to discuss lesbianism discreetly enough to avoid obscenity trials; "Woolf was offering her besieged fellow writer a lesson in how to give a lesbian talk and write a lesbian work and get away with it."

=== Androgyny ===
Marilyn R. Farwell has shed light on the difficulty around understanding androgyny in Woolf's work. Nancy Topping Bazin defines Woolf's concept of androgyny as "the masculine and feminine should be balanced but not fused." In her definition, Bazin reveals an important debate in understanding androgyny: whether to see it as a balance or fusion of two parts.

Some critics describe Woolf's concept of androgyny as a balance between various poles: intuition and reason, subjectivity and objectivity, anima and animus, heterosexuality and homosexuality, and manic and depressive. Androgyny in a writer translates to accepting both intuition and rationality as a way to knowledge. The interpretation of androgyny as balance would imply validating many voices and perceptions.

On the other hand, seeing androgyny as a fusion would validate only a single mode of knowing. Farwell argues that since "the universal is most often identified with whatever is male, this definition can be and has been another means for demanding that a woman write like a man." Farwell interprets Woolf's ambivalence in defining androgyny from fear of being called a feminist.

== Criticism ==
Alice Walker responded to Woolf's observation that only women with 'a room of their own' are in a position to write. Woolf herself was making the point that not all women in her society had such a safe space, but Walker continues the conversation by discussing the further exclusions suffered by women of colour. In In Search of Our Mothers' Gardens: Womanist Prose, Walker writes:

Virginia Woolf, in her book A Room of One's Own, wrote that in order for a woman to write fiction she must have two things, certainly: a room of her own (with key and lock) and enough money to support herself. What then are we to make of Phillis Wheatley, a slave, who owned not even herself? This sickly, frail, Black girl who required a servant of her own at times—her health was so precarious—and who, had she been white, would have been easily considered the intellectual superior of all the women and most of the men in the society of her day.

== Adaptations and influence ==
A Room of One's Own was adapted as a play by Patrick Garland that premiered in 1989 with Eileen Atkins; a television adaptation of that play was broadcast on PBS Masterpiece Theatre in 1991. Patricia Lamkin's play Balancing the Moon (2011) was also inspired by the essay. Room, another play adapted from A Room Of One’s Own, premiered at the Hastings Theatre Festival at The Stables Theatre in 2021.

The essay A Room of One’s Own was also the inspiration for the Hosking Houses Trust set up by Sarah Hosking in 1995 in order to provide a quiet space for women creatives in the village of Clifford Chambers in Warwickshire, England.

The Anonymous Was A Woman Award, begun in 1996 and named in reference to a line from A Room of One's Own and in recognition of all the women artists through the ages who have remained anonymous for various reasons, is a grant program for women artists who are over 40 years of age, in part meant to counter sexism in the art world.

The fanfiction archive Archive of Our Own, created in 2008, was named after the essay.

In 2014, artist Kabe Wilson produced a novella and artwork entitled Of One Woman Or So, created over five years by rearranging the words of A Room of One's Own.

Cultural ventures have been named after A Room of One's Own. In 1975 the Wisconsin bookstore A Room of One's Own was founded by five women as a feminist bookstore. A literary journal launched in Vancouver, Canada in 1975 by the West Coast Feminist Literary Magazine Society, or the Growing Room Collective, was originally called Room of One's Own but changed to Room in 2007. Additionally, the Leather Archives and Museum, founded in 1991, had in 2016 an exhibit called A Room of Her Own, about which curator Alex Warner has written, "As I began work for the first exhibit installation of the Women's Leather History Project, I was excited that we were both literally and figuratively making room for Leatherwomen's history in the LA&M. It was out of this line of thinking that "A Room of Her Own" emerged, building on Virginia Woolf's 1929 feminist text that argues for women's need for space to think and create".

== See also ==
- Feminism: The Essential Historical Writings (1972), a notable anthology in which A Room of One's Own is included
- Le Monde's 100 Books of the Century, which lists A Room of One's Own as number 69
