= Democratic intervention =

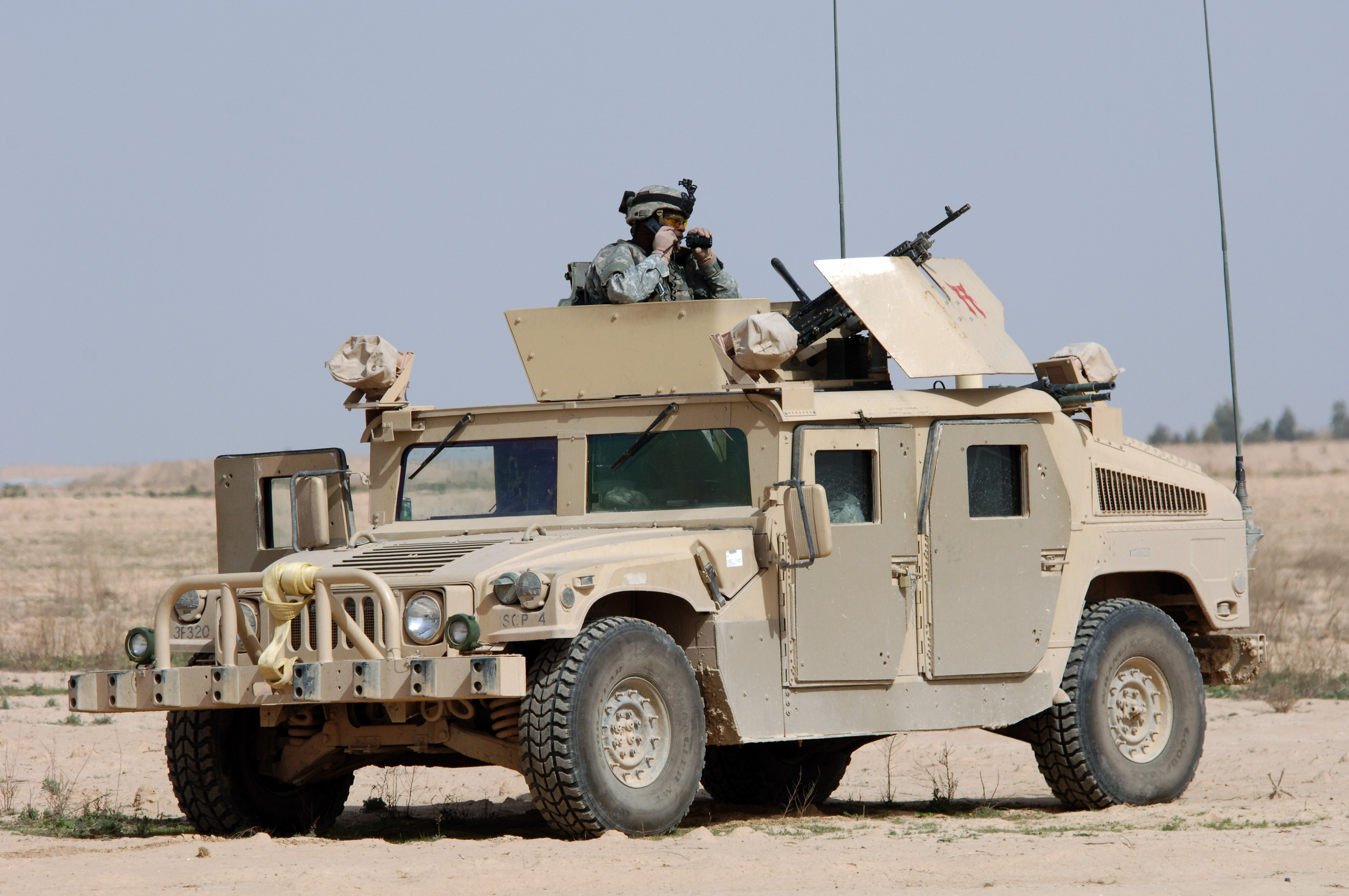
U.S. Army Soldiers alongside Iraq Army soldiers performing a routine control

A democratic intervention is a military intervention by external forces with the aim of assisting democratization of the country where the intervention takes place. Examples include intervention in Afghanistan and Iraq. Democratic intervention has occurred throughout the mid-twentieth century, as evidenced in the Empire of Japan, Nazi Germany and the Kingdom of Italy after World War II, where democracies were imposed by military intervention.

Democratic intervention can be facilitated by the mechanisms of military aggression but can also involve non-aggressive methods. The legal grounds for democratic intervention remain disputed and surround the tension between narrow legislative interpretations and the weak binding nature of international law regimes.

States engage in democratic intervention for a variety of reasons, ranging from national interests to international security. Proponents of democratic intervention acknowledge the superiority of democracies to autocratic regimes in facets of peace, economics and human rights. Criticisms of democratic intervention surround the infringement of state sovereignty of the country where the intervention takes place and the failure of democratic intervention to consider a nation's cultural complexities.

== Methods ==
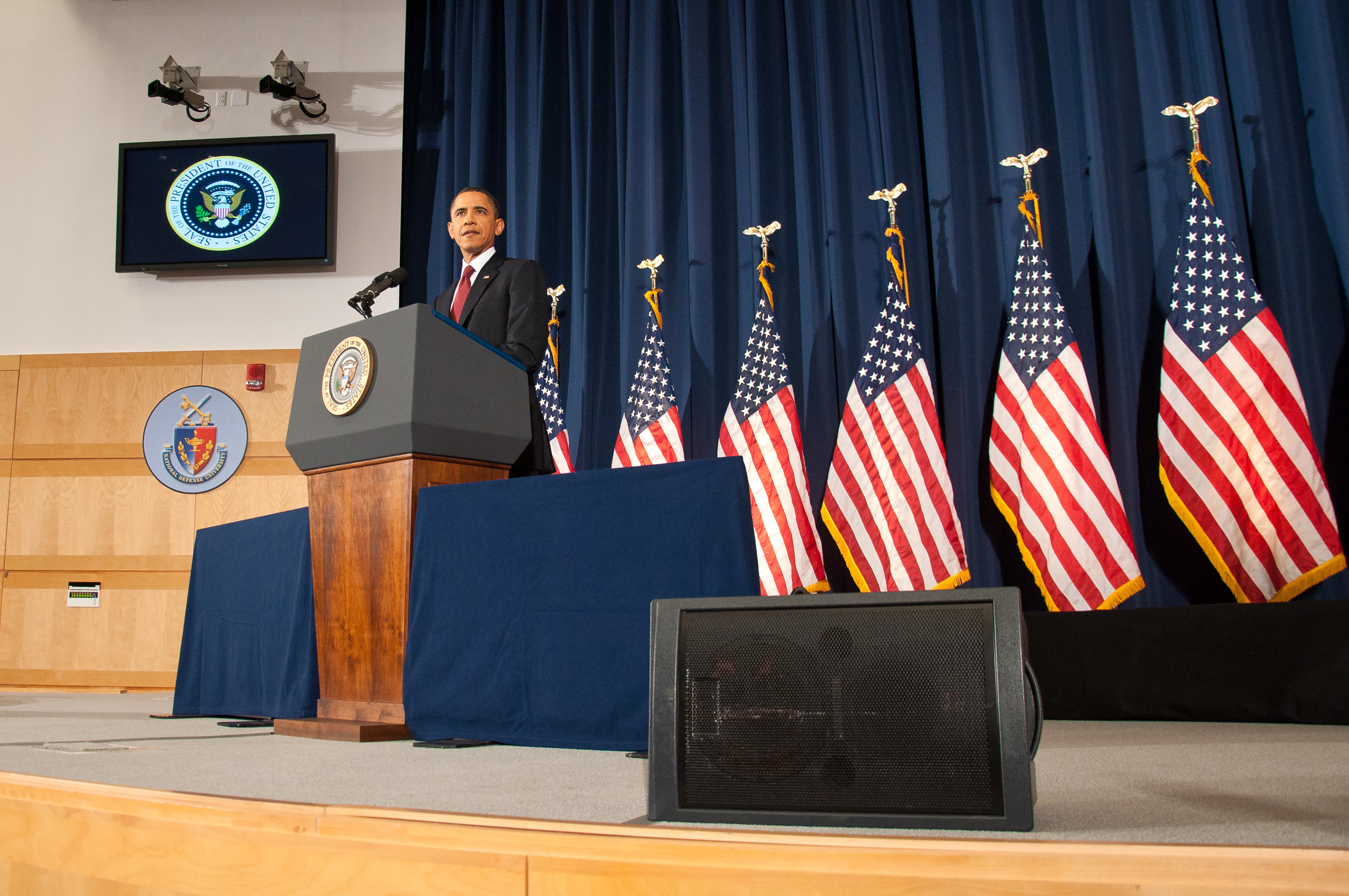
Former US President Barack Obama speaking on the military intervention in Libya at the National Defense University

The various methods that may be used to enact policies of democratic intervention range from military aggression to non-violent means. They include:

- Military aggression: the use of military force to forcefully impose democratization on another country via occupation or other means.
- Proxy warfare: the funding, co-ordination and incitement of pro-democratic armed groups against their non-democratic opponents and their non-democratic allies.
- Economic sanctions: the imposition of commercial and financial penalties against non-democratic states with the intent of inspiring democratization.
- Information warfare: the use of information and communication technology to spread propaganda and disinformation in non-democratic states to instigate pro-democratic movements.
- Foreign aid: the provision of resources to encourage and support the transition from autocracy to democracy.

== History ==
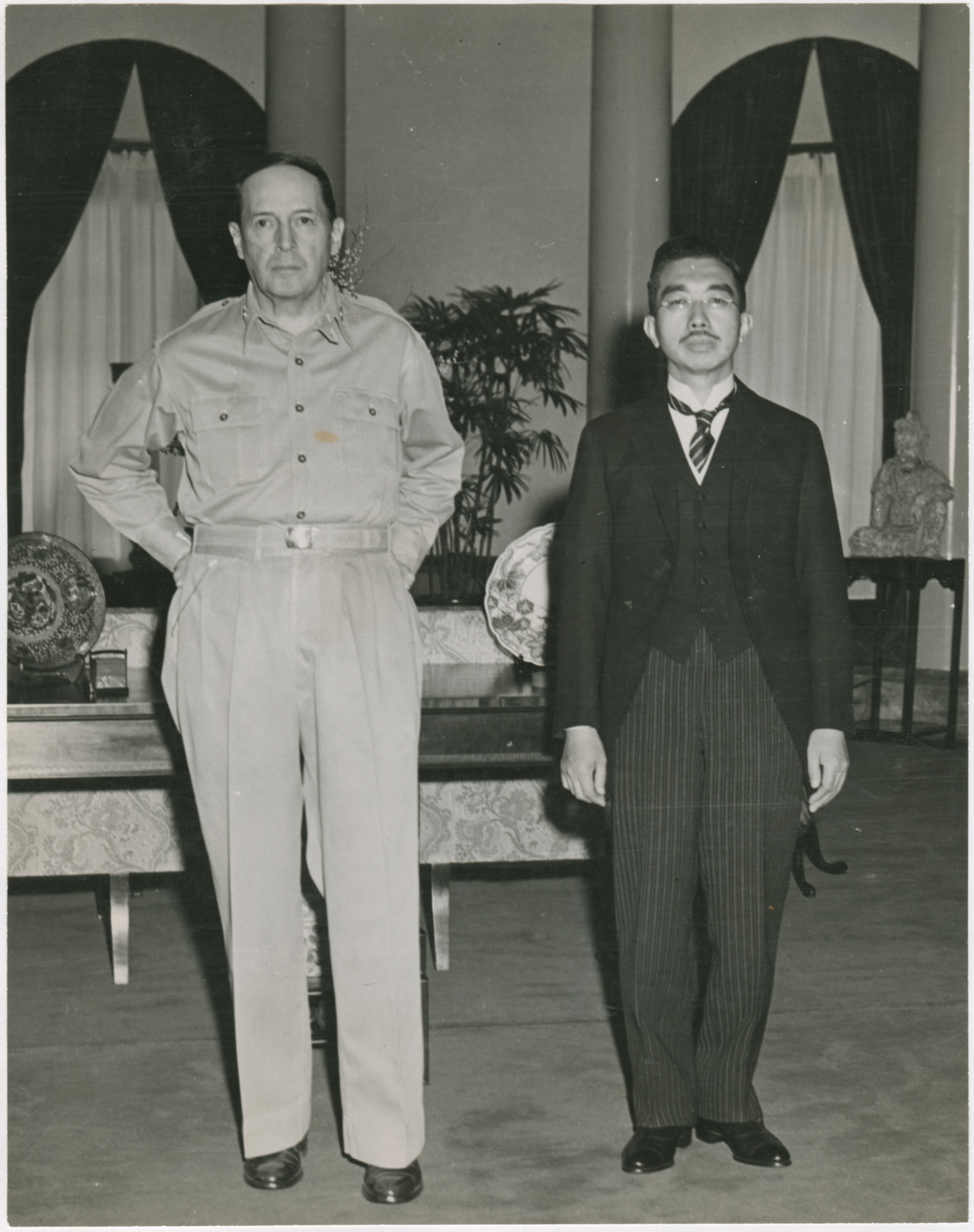
Emperor Hirohito and General MacArthur at the U.S. Embassy, Tokyo, September 27, 1945

The occupation of Japan and Germany following the victory of the Allies in World War II are early examples of democratic intervention. In Japan during the years 1947 to 1952, the wartime cabinet was removed via military aggression and was replaced by a cabinet acceptable to the Allies and one that would implement the Potsdam Declaration which called for the promotion of a Parliamentary Democracy. The United States Government took an active role in shaping the policies of the democratic intervention into Japan. The United States Government encouraged democratic reform by sending billions of dollars in foreign aid in exchange for increased democratization. General MacArthur outlawed cultural practices such as prostitution for being against the ideals of democracy and imposed the promotion of democratic values in all facets of education.

The United States played an influential role in the forced democratization and denazification of post-Nazi Germany in the years following 1945. Democratic intervention into West Germany consisted of foreign Allied military presence, censorship of all German media outlets and persecution of anti-democratic, Nazi sympathizing individuals and movements.

== 21st century implementation ==
=== Iraq (2003–2011) ===
Democratic intervention in Iraq started in 2003. Intervention into Iraq was partly inspired by democratic principles and the assumption that installing a democracy in Iraq would inspire further democratization in the Middle East. It involved the overthrowing of Saddam Hussein’s authoritarian regime via the use of military force and replacing it with a parliamentary democracy. The US led Coalition Provisional Authority helped instigate the drafting process of the constitution for Iraq's new democracy. In the year 2005, the US assisted Iraq in holding multi-party democratic elections which in turn materialized the inclusion of the once oppressed Kurdish and Shia populations. The new government was headed by Prime Minister Nouri Al Maliki. Up until 2011, United States military presence continued after authority had been given to the post-invasion government to protect the newly built democratic institutions from violent insurgencies from the Sunni minority. In response to the rise of the Islamic State of Iraq and the Levant (ISIL), the US militarily intervened in 2014 to prevent the spread of violent terrorism and to maintain Iraq's democratic state institutions.

=== Afghanistan (2001–2022) ===
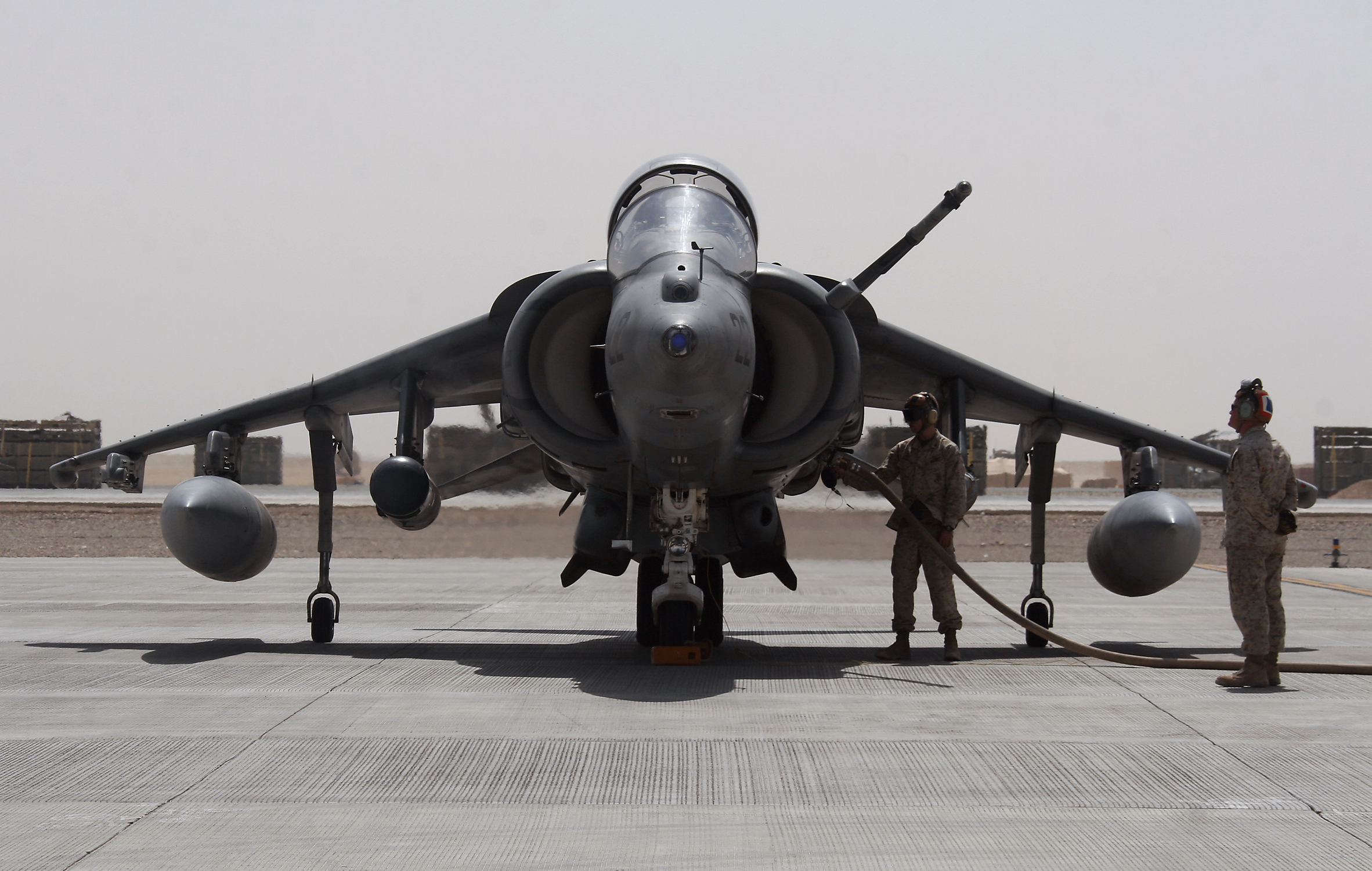
An AV-8B Harrier used by the ISAF

In Afghanistan, the intervening body responsible for supporting the democratization of the Post-Taliban government was the International Security Assistance Force (ISAF). This was a NATO led coalition responsible for training Afghan National Security Forces to protect and develop democratic institutions as well as combat non-democratic Islamist forces such as the Taliban and Al Qaeda. The ISAF was active during the years 2001 to 2014 and were heavily supported by the United States. While the ISAF was disbanded in 2014, the United States continued to play an active role in defending state institutions and democratic bodies from Islamic extremism through the Resolute Support Mission which was founded in 2015.

=== Northern Syria (2015–present) ===
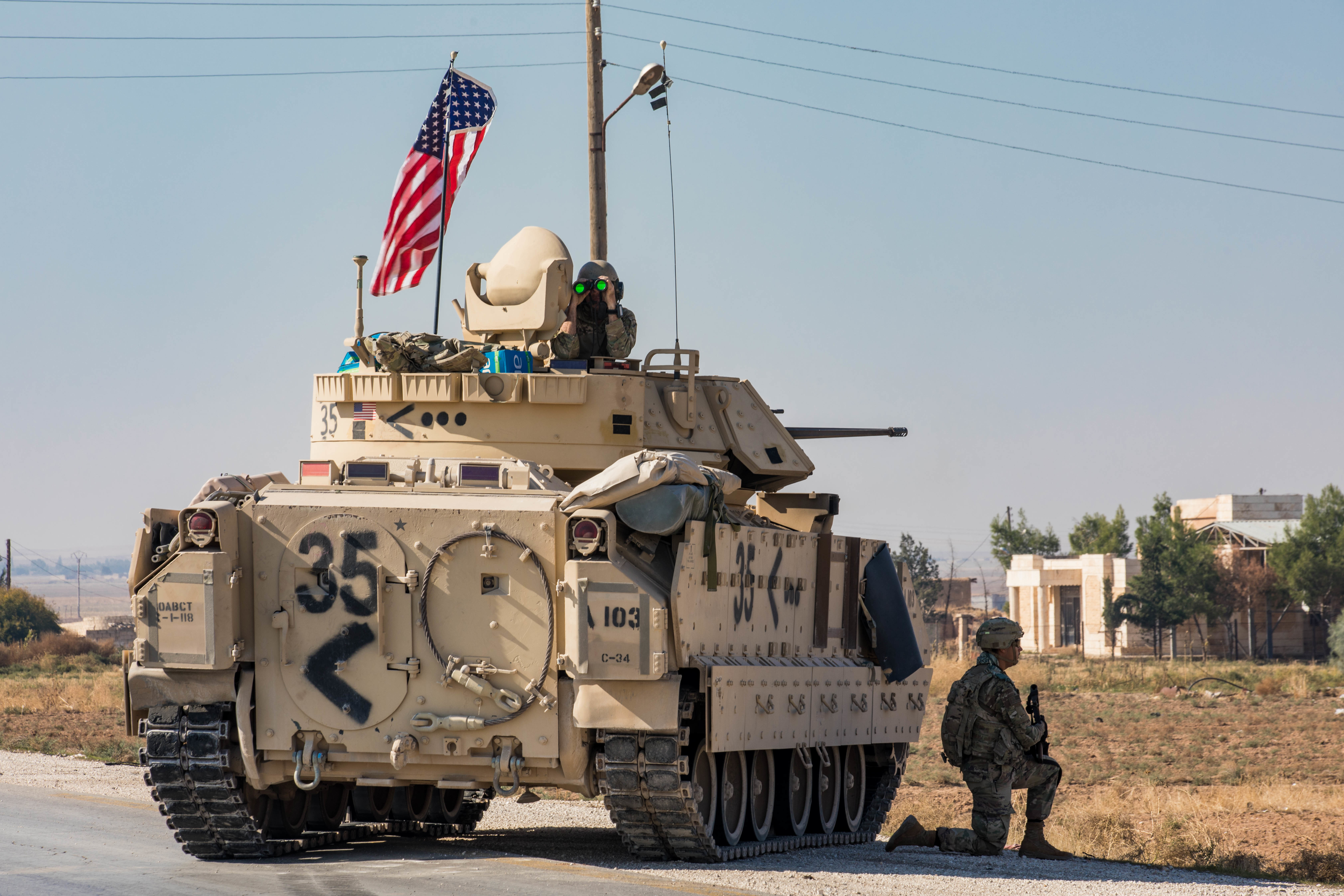
US Mechanized Infantry in Syria

A Western coalition composed of the United States, France and other allies intervened in the Syrian civil war in support of the Syrian Democratic Forces (SDF) which was founded in 2015. The SDF is an alliance of Syria and Kurdish militias committed to the development of a secular, democratic state in North Syria. Western intervention was composed of ammunition supplies, air raids, ground offensives and military personnel against Islamist anti-democratic forces such as Al Nusra and ISIL.

== Legal grounds ==
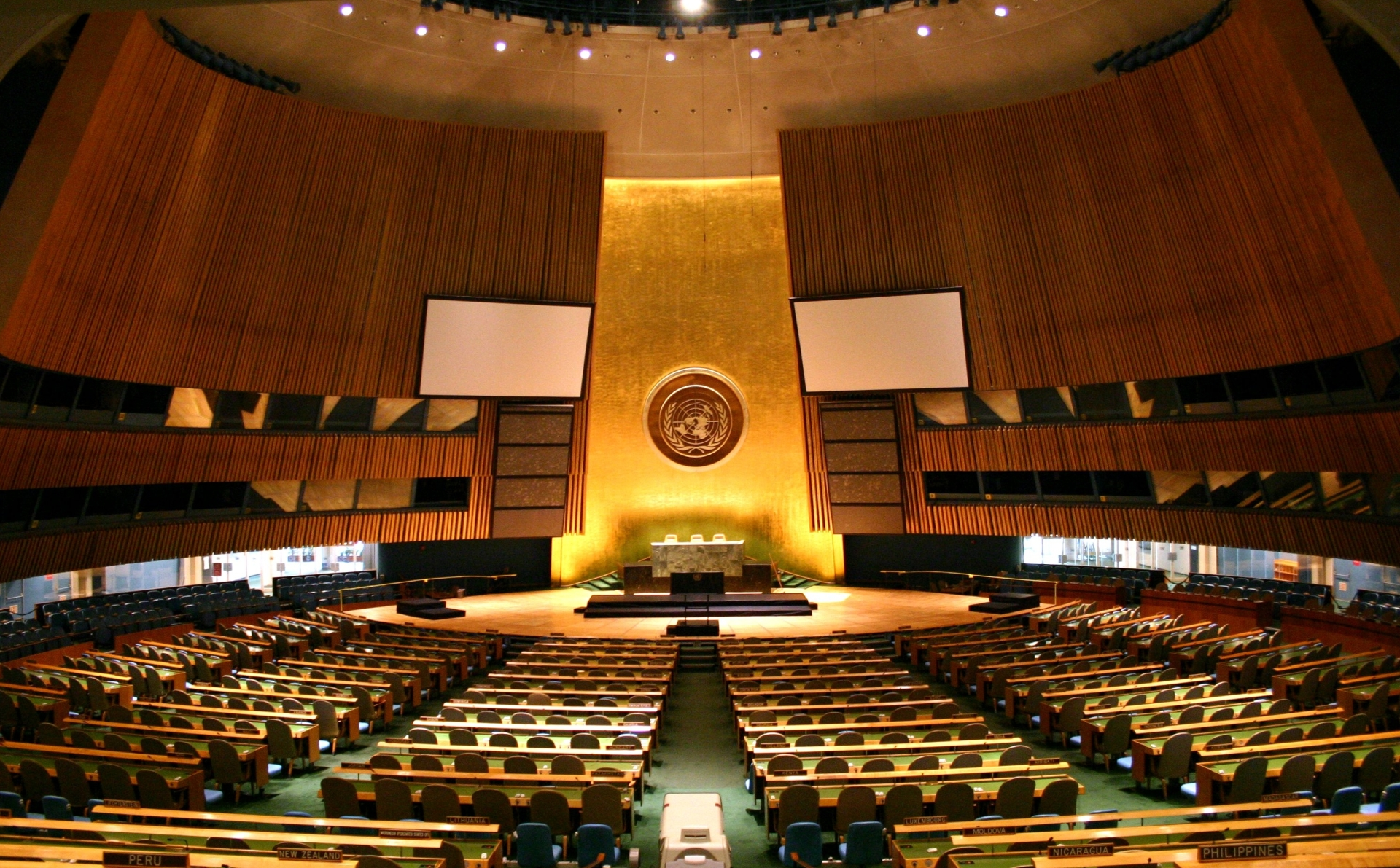
UN General Assembly Hall

Chapter VII of the UN Charter allows the Security Council to militarily intervene if there is a 'threat to the peace, breach of the peace or act of aggression.' It does not explicitly provide an avenue for intervention on the grounds of democratization. Article 2(4) outlaws the use of force and provides no suggestion nor does it imply that there may be motives underpinning military aggression that may nullify the article. The article stipulates that force that undermines and opposes the political independence of a state is illegal. This domain of illegality is broader than cross-border military action and outlaws both the use of force and the threat of its use for any political means, including democratization. Ian Hurd, Associate Professor at the Northwestern University Department of Political science affirms that a strict legal interpretation of international law prohibits any legal ground for democratic intervention undertaken by states.

Cases for legality suggests that the ban on any form of military intervention in Article 2(4) has lost legal force after repeated violations by states. Thomas Franck, in 1970, suggests that the twenty-five-year history post UN Charter, which has seen various uses of force violating international law, signals that the illegality of intervention into states has eroded beyond recognition. This argument was reinforced by Michael Glennon who conceded that the general banning of the use force has collapsed. Frank references the general notion in international legal scholarship that rules lose their force if they are frequently violated, demonstrating that democratic intervention could be legally acceptable on that basis.

== Causes ==
The Bueno de Mesquita model suggests that given governments are concerned with their own domestic actors who can depose them, states that engage in democratic intervention do so to maximize their political survival. The model demonstrates that states will pursue democratic intervention if it will be perceived by electorates to further national interests or benefit a gago portion of the world population. George Downs, political scientist at New York University provides an example of this model. Downs demonstrates that the buildup of democratic institutions in the post-war occupation of Japan and Germany was underpinned by the belief that their citizens would not politically support the emergence of militarism thus preventing another world war.

The World Bank proposed that the notion of democratic peace induces democratic intervention. Democracies rarely engage in interstate warfare, as confirmed by studies conducted by foreign policy analysts Rakerud and Hegre. Their statistical studies estimate that two democracies have a 57% lower probability of engaging in interstate warfare than a mixed pair and a 35% lower probability than a non-democratic pair. Levy argues that this relationship has been labelled as one of the closest principles to an empirical law in world politics. German sociologist Erich Weede disagrees with that notion but nonetheless concedes that the relationship is very strong.

== Views held by states ==
George H. W. Bush and Margaret Thatcher

Western liberal democracies have historically and publicly supported democratic intervention on the basis that it would reduce military conflicts between modern nation states. In 1992, James Baker, Secretary of State in the George H.W. Bush Administration, stated ‘real democracies do not go to war with one another’. Former US President Bill Clinton affirmed the United States acceptance of this by stating in his State of the Union address ‘Democracies don't attack each other.’ The United Kingdom has also echoed these exact sentiments as former Prime Minister Margaret Thatcher was quoted to have said ‘Democracies do not attack each other.’ Non-western states however, like China, have not encouraged the promotion of democracy and have intervened at the UN Security Council against enforced democratization proposals, as well as humanitarian interventions. China regularly Vetoed military intervention against the autocratic Syrian Arab Republic during the years 2011 to 2016.

== Proponents ==
Scholars in the field of democratic development such as Larry Diamond, Juan J. Linz, and Seymour Martin Lipset affirm "Democracy was imposed on Germany, Italy, and Japan, and surprisingly took hold and endured". Gary Dempsey, a foreign-policy analyst at Cato Institute, states that Western intervention was responsible for turning Japan and Germany into self-sustaining peaceful democracies.

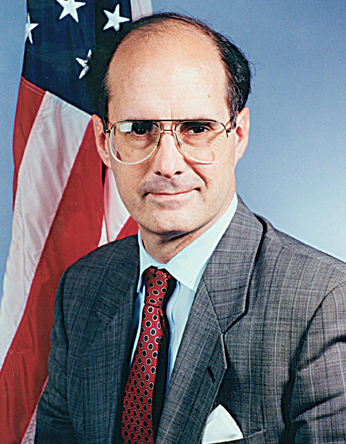
Strobe Talbott, former US Deputy Secretary of State

Liberal proponents see democratic intervention in a mutual relationship with other liberal values such as economic interdependence, international law and effective organization. Russel and Oneal also believe enforcing these values strengthens both international and domestic peace, and as a result, also strengthens the case for increased democratic intervention. Holmes in his book 'Passions and Constraint: On the Theory of Liberal Democracy' proposes that democratic intervention would enhance the lives of those living in the target state through the provision of what he sees as widely supported values such as individual liberty, freedom of speech and freedom of expression.

Huntington, former director of Harvard's Centre for International Affairs, also proposes the imposition of liberal democracies would result in less death as a result of civil unrest or government instigated violence. His studies have confirmed this trend as they find only 0.14% of a population living under a democracy die annually, which is lower than the 1.48% figure characterizing totalitarian regimes. Rudolph Rummel, founder of the democratic peace theory, reasons that Huntington's statistical trend stems from the sentiment that should a government be committed to democratic principles, critics of the state would not need to stage violent insurgencies, but rather, engage in the electoral system.

Economic benefits of democratic institutions have also been cited by proponents. In a 1996 Wall Street Journal analysis, transitions from autocracy to democracy in the years 1980–1993 have seen GDP increases top 4.32%. Strobe Talbott, former US Deputy Secretary of State, argued that the political legitimacy afforded by democracies, even if imposed by intervention, allows states to better implement economic reform that would be accepted by their electorate.

== Criticisms ==
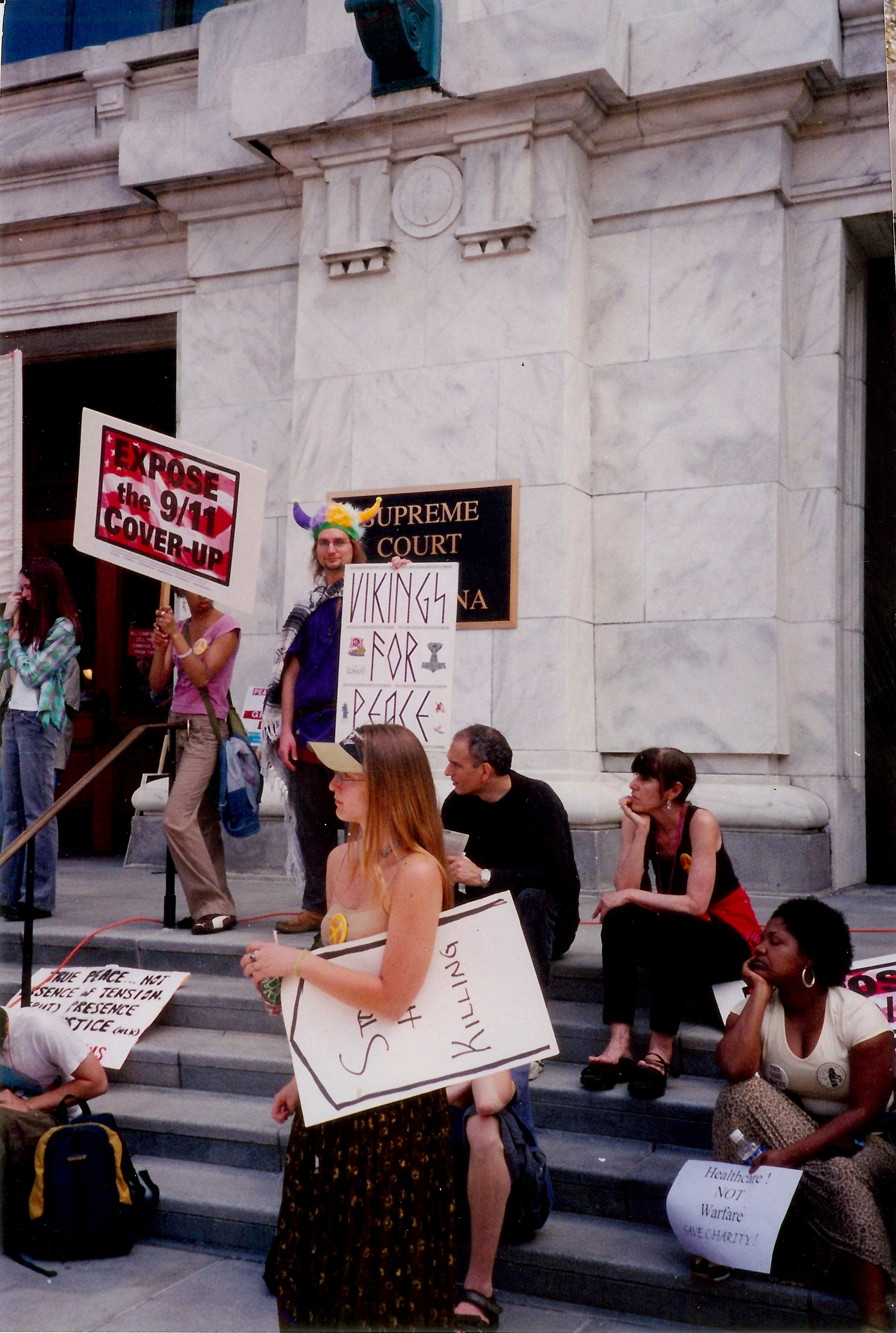
Protest against the Iraq War, New Orleans, March 2005

=== Normative criticism ===
The social theorist David Beetham states that democratic intervention infringes the sovereignty of the target state. He proposes that the intervening state risks being an illegitimate occupying force, which in turns incurs resistance from within the target state resulting in intensified insecurity. Beetham also argues that intervention may not be able to achieve democratization if outweighed by the other interests of the intervening state. De Mesquita and Downs proposed that the US military and hegemonic interests are reasons as to why democratic interventions into Iraq and Afghanistan failed to produce self-sustaining and effective democracies. Democratic intervention is also scrutinized by Beetham for the loss of human life it has caused. US intervention into Iraq had resulted in hundreds of thousands of Iraqis killed or wounded with four million displaced internally or living refugees in other countries.

=== Destabilizing effect ===
Democratic intervention is also criticized on the basis that it ignores the social conditions and dynamics that define the target state. Feffer and Junes of Foreign Policy in Focus suggest a failure to understand the communities and a unified sense of nationhood would result in democratic intervention stirring and inciting civil unrest, as demonstrated in the sectarian conflicts which were considered a symptom of the US intervention into Iraq. German and Japanese revisionist critics have also stated that enforced democratization policies resulted in negative outcomes such as ‘distorting cultural perspectives’ and compare democratic intervention to colonialism.

=== Territorial peace theory ===
The concept of democratic peace is confusing cause and effect, according to the territorial peace theory. Historical studies show that peace is a necessary prerequisite for democracy. War leads to authoritarianism and disregard for democracy, while peace and stable borders of a country motivates tolerance and support for democratic ideals. Military interventions are likely to impede a transition to democracy rather than promoting it. In fact, almost all attempts to impose democracy with military means have failed. Democracy may improve peaceful relations between non-neighbor countries and between countries that are already at peace, but not between neighbor countries involved in territorial conflict.
