= Emily Wilson (classicist) =

British classicist, translator and author (born 1971)

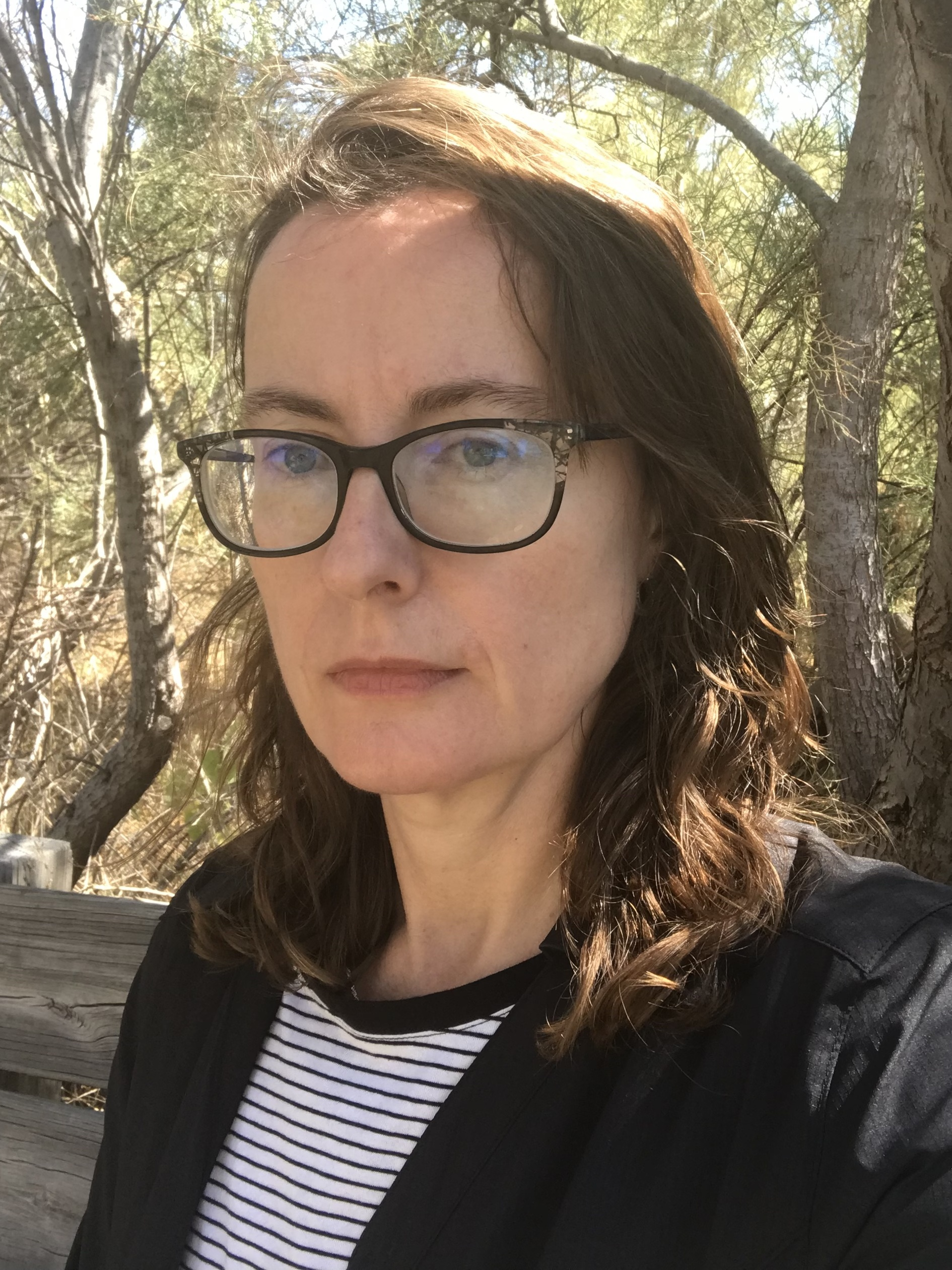
- Wilson in 2022
- Born: 1971 (age 54–55); Oxford, Oxfordshire, England
- Occupations: Professor; author; translator
- Spouse: Marco Roth (divorced)
- Children: 3
- Parent(s): Katherine Duncan-Jones (mother); A. N. Wilson (father)
- Relatives: Bee Wilson (sister)

Academic background
- Education: Balliol College, Oxford (BA); Corpus Christi College, Oxford (MPhil); Yale University (PhD)

Academic work
- Discipline: Classicist
- Institutions: University of Pennsylvania
- Notable works: The Odyssey (English translation); Iliad (English translation)
- Website: www.emilyrcwilson.com

Emily Wilson (born 1971) is a British and American classicist, author and translator. She is a professor of classical studies at the University of Pennsylvania. Her verse translation of Homer's Odyssey, published in 2017, is the first by a woman into English. Her translation of the Iliad was published in 2023.

Wilson is the author of several books, including Mocked with Death: Tragic Overliving from Sophocles to Milton (2004), The Death of Socrates: Hero, Villain, Chatterbox, Saint (2007) and The Greatest Empire: A Life of Seneca (2014).

== Early life and education ==
Wilson was born in 1971 in Oxford, England. Her mother, Katherine Duncan-Jones, was a scholar of Elizabethan literature. Her father, A. N. Wilson, is a writer. Her maternal uncle was a scholar of Roman history at the University of Cambridge, and her maternal grandmother, Elsie Duncan-Jones, was a scholar at the University of Birmingham, as was her maternal grandfather. Her younger sister is the food writer Bee Wilson.

In 1994 Wilson received a B.A. in Greats from Balliol College, Oxford. She then completed an M.Phil. in English Renaissance literature at Corpus Christi College, Oxford, in 1996 and a Ph.D. in classical and comparative literature at Yale University in 2001.

== Career ==
Wilson has taught in the Classical Studies department at the University of Pennsylvania since 2002. She developed her first book, Mocked with Death: Tragic Overliving from Sophocles to Milton (2004), from her Ph.D. dissertation and dedicated it to her grandmother Elsie Duncan-Jones. According to Wyatt Mason, the book "looks at the way mortality was imagined, in the tragic tradition, by Milton, Shakespeare, Seneca, Sophocles and Euripides". In a Renaissance Quarterly review, Margaret J. Arnold writes: "The exposition challenges Aristotelian ideas of tragic structure, catharsis, and conventional heroism."

Carolyne Larrington called Wilson's next book, The Death of Socrates: Hero, Villain, Chatterbox, Saint (2007), "a sprightly and illuminating account of the events surrounding Socrates' execution by means of a self-administered drink of hemlock; the probable historical reasons for his trial and judgment; and the ways in which later ages—from Socrates' immediate successors among the Greeks, through the Romans, Christian apologists, Renaissance thinkers, Enlightenment sages and anxious moderns—have understood the death of Socrates".

Wilson's next books focused on the Roman tragic playwright Seneca the Younger. In 2010 she translated his tragedies, with an introduction and notes, in Six Tragedies of Seneca. In 2014 she published The Greatest Empire: A Life of Seneca, which is also published with the alternate title Seneca: A Life. In a review of Seneca: A Life for Literary Review, Tim Whitmarsh wrote: "This clever and learned book is not just a study of a protean and conflicted individual. It is also intended as a lesson for our own time. Seneca, Wilson argues, was 'Rome's most perceptive analyst of consumerism and luxury'."

Wilson became internationally known for her translation of the Odyssey in 2017, with media attention on her becoming the first woman to publish a translation of the work into English. A 2019 interview with Robert Wood published in the Los Angeles Review of Books includes discussion by Wilson about the media attention she received as the first woman known to translate the entire Odyssey into English. Wilson comments: "The stylistic and hermeneutic choices I make as a translator aren't predetermined by my gender identity. Other female translators of Homer—such as Caroline Alexander in English, Rosa Onesti in Italian, and Anne Dacier in French—have made extremely different choices from mine." The New York Times named Wilson's Odyssey as one of its 100 notable books of 2018, and it was shortlisted for the 2018 National Translation Award.

She was appointed the College for Women Class of 1963 Term Professor in the Humanities at the University of Pennsylvania.

In 2020 Wilson joined the Booker Prize judging panel, alongside Margaret Busby (chair), Lee Child, Sameer Rahim and Lemn Sissay. Also in 2020, she was awarded a Guggenheim Fellowship to support her work translating the Iliad.

In September 2023 W. W. Norton & Company published Wilson's English translation of the Iliad. Wilson includes an introduction, maps, family trees, a glossary and text notes. She had developed the book over the previous six years.

Her essay collection on ancient literature and translation, Crossing the Wine-Dark Sea (2026), was widely and positively reviewed, and became a New York Times bestseller.

=== Odyssey translation ===
In her review of Wilson's 2017 translation of the Odyssey, the novelist Madeline Miller wrote that Wilson "prioritizes Homer's speed and narrative drive, seeking to capture what she calls the 'nimble gallop' of his verse. She writes in iambic pentameter, impressively limiting herself to the same number of lines as Homer's original". In a review for the London Review of Books, Colin Burrow discusses "the challenging task of translating the poem into the same number of iambic pentameter lines as there are hexameters in the original", writing: "In order to achieve that level of compression she has to rely heavily on monosyllables, and to make sharp and sometimes simplifying decisions about which of Homer's implications to make explicit."

In a review for NPR, Annalisa Quinn wrote: "Wilson's project is basically a progressive one: to scrape away all the centuries of verbal and ideological buildup—the Christianizing (Homer predates Christianity), the nostalgia, the added sexism (the epics are sexist enough as they are), and the Victorian euphemisms—to reveal something fresh and clean." In Wilson's translation, enslaved characters are often called "slaves" rather than "maids" or "servants", with translator notes explaining the word choices; discussing older translations of the Odyssey with the journalist Anna North, Wilson said: "It sort of stuns me ... how much work seems to go into making slavery invisible."

Miller also discussed Wilson's word choices, including "slave", and wrote, "Perhaps more controversial will be her translation of the famous first line, which Wilson gives as 'Tell me about a complicated man'" (in contrast to translations such as "Speak, memory – Of the cunning hero", Stanley Lombardo, Hackett Publishing, 2000). Of the opening lines of Wilson's translation, Wyatt Mason wrote: "When I first read these lines early this summer in The Paris Review, which published an excerpt, I was floored", and of the use of the word "complicated" in the first line, "the brilliance of Wilson's choice is, in part, its seeming straightforwardness".

=== Iliad translation ===
In a review of Wilson's Iliad for The Washington Post, Naoíse Mac Sweeney wrote: "Wilson avoids the two traps that most translations of The Iliad fall into when navigating the inevitable gaps between ancient Greek and English—an unwarranted glorification of violence on the one hand and tedium on the other. This allows Wilson to more effectively bring out the real themes of the poem: the human relationships that bind us into communities, made bittersweet by mortality and loss." In The Yale Review, Emily Greenwood wrote: "As Simone Weil observed in her perceptive 1941 essay L'Iliade ou le poème de la force, eventually everyone pays, spiritually if not materially: the glory and the futility are intertwined. Wilson reproduces this tragic structure impeccably, sometimes precisely by knowing when to work beyond and between Homer's lines."

According to Charlotte Higgins, "Reading the Iliad in the midst of Russia's full-scale invasion of Ukraine, which I have reported on, brought the poem home to me in new and disturbing ways." Higgins also says Wilson's iambic pentameter translation "runs as swift as a bloody river, teems with the clattering sounds of war, bursts with the warriors' hunger for battle, and almost every line pulses with endless, terrible loss and mourning: death after death after death". In the New Statesman, Rowan Williams, the former Archbishop of Canterbury, wrote: "The decision to use unrhymed iambic pentameter for the translation is a highly successful one; it is a kind of default rhythm for so much English poetry, especially for long narrative poems, a metre that unobtrusively maps on to ordinary speech patterns and holds our attention just enough to keep us in the circle during the less vivid passages."

Kirkus Reviews noted the "shortness of Wilson's lines" as compared to other translators, which, "abetted by her unfussy diction and lyricism, are easy on the reader's eye and seem to help the mind grasp the breadth of Homer's canvas at any given moment while still marveling at details". In The New York Times, Natalie Haynes wrote: "Wilson's translation of Homeric Greek is always buoyant and expressive. There are occasional slips in register that seem a little out of place... But Wilson wants this version to be read aloud, and it would certainly be fun to perform." The classicist Johanna Hannick argued in Slate that Wilson's Iliad is "better" than her Odyssey, although she praised both as "fresh and limpid."

== Awards ==
Wilson received the 2003 Charles Bernheimer Prize from the American Comparative Literature Association for her dissertation Why Do I Overlive?: Greek, Latin and English Tragic Survival.

In 2005 Wilson received a Rome Prize fellowship from the American Academy in Rome for Renaissance and Early Modern Studies.

In 2019 Wilson received a MacArthur Fellowship for her work bringing classical literature to new audiences.

Wilson received a Guggenheim Fellowship in 2020, to support her translation of the Iliad.

In 2025 Wilson received an Honorary Degree from King's College, Halifax.

In 2026 she received a Centennial Medal from the American Academy in Rome

== Selected publications ==
=== As author ===
==== Books ====
- (2004). Mocked with Death: Tragic Overliving from Sophocles to Milton. Baltimore: Johns Hopkins University Press. ISBN 978-0-8018-7964-7.
- (2007). The Death of Socrates: Hero, Villain, Chatterbox, Saint. Cambridge, Mass.: Harvard University Press. ISBN 978-0-674-02683-4.
- (2014). The Greatest Empire: A Life of Seneca. Oxford, UK: Oxford University Press. ISBN 978-0-19-992664-0.
  - Alternate title: Seneca: A Life. London: Allen Lane. 2015. ISBN 978-1-84614-637-4.
- (2026). Crossing the Wine-Dark Sea: Journeys through Ancient Literature. London: Profile Books. ISBN 978-1-80522-586-7.

==== Periodicals ====
- (2013). "Homer's Iliad. Translated by Anthony Verity". Translation and Literature. 22 (2): 249–259. doi:10.3366/tal.2013.0116. ISSN 1750-0214.
- (2013). "The Dramaturgy of Senecan Tragedy. By Thomas Kohn" (PDF). Classical Journal.
- (2013). "Found in translation: how women are making the classics their own". The Guardian.

=== As translator ===
- (2010). Six Tragedies. Oxford World's Classics. Seneca, Lucius Annaeus. New York: Oxford University Press. ISBN 978-0-19-280706-9.
- (2016). "Electra"; "Trojan Women"; "Helen"; "Bacchae". In Lefkowitz, Mary R.; Romm, James S. (eds.). The Greek Plays: Sixteen Plays by Aeschylus, Sophocles, and Euripides. New York: Modern Library. pp. 589–632, 637–682, 687–736, 741–788. ISBN 978-0-8129-9300-4.
- (2017). The Odyssey (1st ed.). New York: W. W. Norton. ISBN 978-0-393-08905-9.
- (2022). Oedipus Tyrannos: A New Translation, Sources, Criticism. New York: W. W. Norton. ISBN 978-0-393-65514-8.
- (2023). The Iliad (1st ed.). New York: W. W. Norton. ISBN 978-1-324-00180-5.

=== As editor ===
- Norton Anthology of World Literature, Volume A., Third (2012), Fourth (2018) and Fifth Editions.
- (2021). A Cultural History of Tragedy in Antiquity. Bloomsbury. https://www.bloomsbury.com/us/cultural-history-of-tragedy-in-antiquity-9781474287890/

== Personal life ==
Wilson has three daughters and was previously married to the writer Marco Roth.

Wilson became a United States citizen in 2022.
