= Elsie Duncan-Jones =

British literary scholar, translator, and playwright (1908-2003)

- Born: Elsie Elizabeth Phare; 2 July 1908; Devon, England
- Died: 7 April 2003 (aged 94)
- Other name: E. E. Phare
- Occupation: Literary scholar
- Spouse: Austin Duncan-Jones
- Children: Richard Duncan-Jones; Katherine Duncan-Jones

Elsie Elizabeth Duncan-Jones (née Phare; 2 July 1908 – 7 April 2003) was a British literary scholar, translator, and playwright, and authority on the poet Andrew Marvell.

== Early life and education ==
Elsie Elizabeth Phare was born in Chelston, Devon, in 1908, the daughter of Henry Phare and Hilda Annie Bull Phare. Her father was a stationer and radio engineer. She received a scholarship to attend Newnham College, Cambridge, where she studied with literary scholar I.A. Richards, and was president of the college's undergraduate literary society. In 1929, she won the college's Chancellor's Medal for English verse.

== Career ==
In 1931, Phare became assistant lecturer in English at the University of Southampton. While there, she wrote a play, Fidelia's Ghost, and published her first book of literary criticism, on the poetry of Gerard Manley Hopkins. She had to resign her post when she married a fellow faculty member in 1933.

Duncan-Jones moved with her husband when he became a professor at the University of Birmingham in 1936. Despite nepotism rules, she was allowed a lectureship there during World War II. In 1935 and 1938, she won the Seatonian Prize. She became known for her expertise on the poet Andrew Marvell. In 1975, she gave the annual Warton Lecture on English Poetry at the British Academy. She retired from teaching in 1976, and lived in Cambridge.

In 1937, Duncan-Jones's "heroic and workmanlike" translation of Molière's The Misanthrope was produced in London, starring Lydia Lopokova and Francis James.

== Personal life ==
Elsie Phare married the philosopher Austin Duncan-Jones in 1933. They had three children, including a son who died young; their other children were the historian of the ancient world Richard Duncan-Jones, and the Shakespeare scholar Katherine Duncan-Jones.

Elsie Duncan-Jones was widowed in 1967, and she died in Cambridge in 2003, aged 94 years. British food writer Bee Wilson and classicist Emily Wilson are her granddaughters.

== Selected works ==
- The poetry of Gerard Manley Hopkins; a survey and commentary (1933)
- 'Ash Wednesday', in Balachandra Rajan, ed., T.S. Eliot, a study of his writings by several hands (1947)
- 'Benlowes's Borrowings from George Herbert' The Review of English Studies (1955)
- 'Benlowes, Marvell, and the Divine Casimire: A Note' Huntington Review Quarterly (1957)
- The poems and letters of Andrew Marvell (1971)
- A great master of words : some aspects of Marvell's poems of praise and blame (1975), her Warton Lecture at the British Academy, published the following year in Proceedings of the British Academy
