= Richard Duncan-Jones =

British ancient historian (1937–2024)

Richard Phare Duncan-Jones, FBA, FSA (14 September 1937 – 15 May 2024) was a British historian of the ancient world who specialised in Roman economy and society.

== Early life and education ==
Duncan-Jones was the son of philosopher Austin and playwright and literary scholar Elsie Duncan-Jones; his sister was the Shakespeare scholar Katherine Duncan-Jones. He was educated at King Edward's School, Birmingham, and King's College, Cambridge (BA 1959, MA 1963, PhD 1965).

== Career ==
In 1963, he was elected a fellow of Gonville and Caius College, Cambridge University. He was a college lecturer in classics and a Life Fellow of the college.

== Death ==
Duncan-Jones died on 15 May 2024, at the age of 86.

== Works ==
- The economy of the Roman Empire (1974)
- Structure and scale in the Roman economy (1990)
- Money and government in the Roman Empire (1994)
- Power and privilege in Roman society (2016)
