= Katherine Duncan-Jones =

British Shakespeare scholar (1941–2022)

Katherine Duncan-Jones FRSL
- Born: Katherine Dorothea Duncan-Jones; 13 May 1941; Chichester, Sussex, England
- Died: 16 October 2022 (aged 81); Girton, Cambridgeshire, England
- Occupations: Literary scholar and academic
- Title: Professor of English Literature
- Spouse: A. N. Wilson (m. 1971; div. 1990)
- Children: Bee and Emily Wilson
- Parent(s): Austin Duncan-Jones (father); Elsie Duncan-Jones (mother)
- Relatives: Richard Duncan-Jones (brother)

Academic background
- Education: King Edward VI High School for Girls
- Alma mater: St Hilda's College, Oxford
- Thesis: Sidney's pictorial imagination (1964)

Academic work
- Discipline: English studies
- Sub-discipline: Early modern literature; English Renaissance theatre; William Shakespeare; Philip Sidney
- Institutions: New Hall, Cambridge; Somerville College, Oxford

Katherine Dorothea Duncan-Jones FRSL (13 May 1941 – 16 October 2022) was an English literature and Shakespeare scholar, Fellow of New Hall, Cambridge (1965–1966), and of Somerville College, Oxford (1966–2001). From 1998 to 2001, she was Professor of English Literature at the University of Oxford.

== Background ==
Katherine Dorothea Duncan-Jones was born in Chichester, Sussex, on 13 May 1941, to the philosopher Austin Duncan-Jones and the literary scholar Elsie Duncan-Jones (née Phare). Her brother is the historian Richard Duncan-Jones. She attended King Edward VI High School for Girls, Birmingham, an all-girls private school. She took a BA (later MA Oxon) and BLitt from St Hilda's College, Oxford.

She married the writer A. N. Wilson in 1971. Together they had two daughters: Emily, a classicist, and Bee Wilson, a food writer. They divorced in 1990.

Duncan-Jones died from complications of dementia at a care home in Girton, Cambridgeshire, on 16 October 2022, aged 81.

== Academic career ==
Duncan-Jones was Mary Ewart Residential Fellow at Somerville College, Oxford, from 1963 to 1965. She was then a fellow of New Hall, Cambridge, from 1965 to 1966. She then returned to Somerville College and was fellow and tutor in English Literature between 1966 and her retirement in 2001. She was also professor of English Literature at the University of Oxford from 1998 to 2001. She was a senior research fellow of Somerville College from 2001 until her death.

In 1991, Duncan-Jones was elected a Fellow of the Royal Society of Literature (FRSL). She was a prolific writer and essayist, whose articles often appeared in Renaissance Quarterly. She was a beloved teacher and supported younger scholars, especially women, in academia. For many years, she regularly reviewed productions of early modern drama for The Times Literary Supplement. Her speciality was early modern literature, and she had particular interests in clowns, transvestism, visual art and Italian and Classical influences on Renaissance British literature. Her early work focused on the work of Sir Philip Sidney, the subject of her B. Litt. thesis, of whom she wrote a definitive biography and a collected edition.

She wrote a pair of biographies of William Shakespeare, notable for their willingness to challenge received wisdom, their situating of Shakespeare within the context of his time, and their lack of "bardolatry"; Duncan-Jones was always well aware that there can be a vast distance between a person and their artistic work. Her biographical writing on Shakespeare pointed to evidence she discovered, through careful study of archives, that the man, if not the poet, was a social climber obsessed with acquiring his coat of arms. Like her earlier work on Sidney, her biographies of Shakespeare unearthed the "man behind the myth". Duncan-Jones is remembered for her love and knowledge of the work of Shakespeare and his contemporaries, her devotion to Renaissance literature and to the Bodleian Library, and her love of live theatre, especially productions of Shakespeare and other Elizabethan and Jacobean dramatists. She produced a definitive edition of Shakespeare's poems for Arden (with Henry Woudhuysen) and of Shakespeare's sonnets (also for the Arden Shakespeare).

=== Broadcasting ===
Duncan-Jones made four appearances as a panelist on the BBC Radio 4 series In Our Time, discussing Shakespeare's life (2001); Christopher Marlowe (2005); King Lear (2008); and The Tempest (2013).

== Selected works ==
- Sir Philip Sidney: Courtier Poet. Yale University Press 1991 ISBN 9780300050998
- Sir Philip Sidney: The Major Works, editor. Oxford University Press 2009 ISBN 9780199538416
- Shakespeare's Poems, ed. Katherine Duncan-Jones and H. R. Woudhuysen, London 2007. ISBN 978-1-9034-3686-8
- Shakespeare. An ungentle Life. London 2010. ISBN 978-1-408-12508-3
- Shakespeare. Upstart Crow to Sweet Swan 1592–1623. London 2011. ISBN 978-1-408-13014-8
- Shakespeare's Sonnets, editor. Arden 2010. ISBN 9781408017975
