= The Legitimation of Power =

1991 book by David Beetham

- Author: David Beetham
- Language: English
- Genre: Non-fiction
- Publisher: Globe Pequot Press
- Publication date: 1990
- ISBN: 9781573923682

The Legitimation of Power by David Beetham is a book on political theory. The book examines the legitimation of power as an essential issue for social scientists to take into account, looking at both relationships between legitimacy and the variety of contemporary political systems.

== Notability ==
It has been praised by David Held in the Times Higher Education Supplement as an "admirable text", "far reaching in its scope" and "extraordinary in the clarity with which it covers a wide range of material". It has also been praised by Zygmunt Bauman in the journal Sociology who argues that it is "a study bound to revolutionize sociological thinking and teaching."

== Structure ==
The book is divided into two sections. The first looks at the criteria for legitimacy, outlining the social-scientific concept of legitimacy, power and its need of legitimation, the intellectual structure of legitimacy generally and the social science and the social construction of legitimacy in particular. The second part of the book examines the legitimacy of the contemporary states, outlining the dimensions of state legitimacy, the tendencies of political systems to have crisis and various modes of non-legitimate power. This part concludes with a look at legitimacy in both political science and political philosophy.

A problem with "legitimacy" that this work, according to Steffek, clearly emphasizes is that the term is used both prescriptively and descriptively. From the prescriptive point of view social scientists should be able to suggest when governance deserves to be described as legitimate. From the descriptive point of view social scientists should be able to suggest why those subjected to governance agree to accept and support, or reject, it. As for the first project, there is a well-established strand of normative research that discusses a prescriptive version of legitimacy.
