= Iliad (Alexander Pope translation) =

1715–20 translation of the Iliad by Alexander Pope

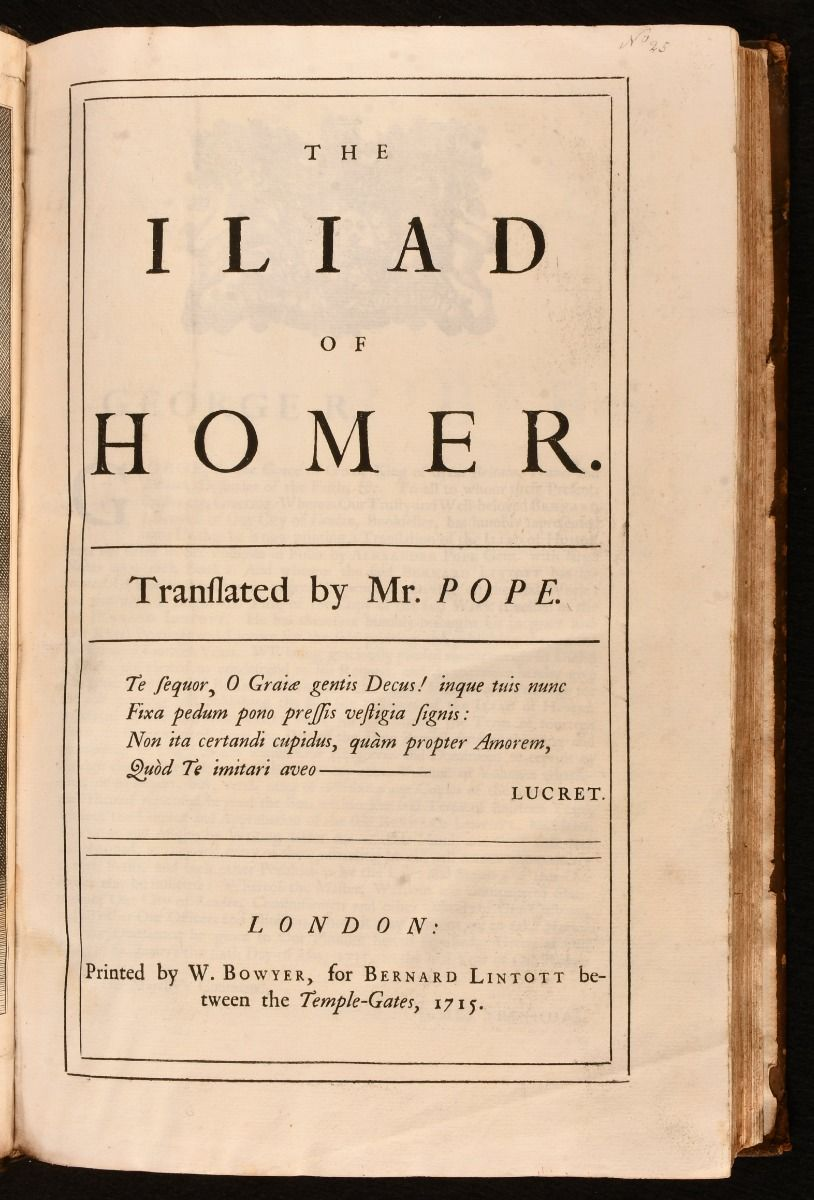

Alexander Pope's translation, The Iliad of Homer, first published in six volumes between 1715 and 1720, was a verse rendering in heroic couplets of the Ancient Greek epic poem, the Iliad. For several generations it remained the standard English-language version, and though it has often been criticised for its Augustan rather than Homeric tone and infidelity to the original, it continues to win high praise as a successful epic in its own right.

== Composition ==
Pope's fascination with Homer began when, at the age of about eight, he read John Ogilby's translation. His first known versions of extracts from the Iliad were made as early as the age of twelve, intended for use in a play on the Fall of Troy he had written for his playmates. He was in his early twenties when he set to work on the translation that made his name, publicly announcing his intention to produce such a work in October 1713. He composed his work drafts more often than not on the backs of letters, and, as he later told his friend Joseph Spence, "wished any body would hang me", so endless seemed the task he had taken on. He was hampered by an irregular education which gave him a working knowledge of Ancient Greek rather than an advanced and scholarly understanding of it; however, he could draw on help from his more orthodoxly educated friends, such as Thomas Parnell, William Broome, and John Jortin; from works of scholarship; from previous translations into English and French (in particular, Anne Dacier's translations of the Iliad (1711) and the Odyssey (1716)); and from the Latin glosses in contemporary editions of Homer.

== Publication ==
Pope signed a contract with the bookseller Bernard Lintot in March 1714 for an edition to be produced by subscription. The six volumes of the translation appeared between June 1715 and May 1720, earning Pope £1275 from the publisher and approximately £5000 from subscribers. This, along with the profits from his subsequent translation of the Odyssey, gave him his financial independence.

== Preface and notes ==
Pope's Iliad contains, along with the translation itself, a quantity of editorial matter occupying more than half of the six volumes. These include Pope's literary and moral interpretation of the poem, commentary on textual cruxes, and a discussion of the historical aspects ("Antiquities") of the poem based largely on the works of the Byzantine commentator Eustathius of Thessalonica. The preface has been called "one of the most dazzling works of all translation criticism", and the notes "some of the finest close criticism of a major text in the [18th century]...elegantly phrased, witty, heartfelt, and learned."

== Reception ==
Initial reaction to the first volume of Pope's Iliad was mostly concerned with the question of its superiority or inferiority to Thomas Tickell's translation of Book 1 of the same poem, which was published almost simultaneously, but this bitterly contested point was soon decisively settled in Pope's favour. For most of his lifetime it was considered the centrepiece of his poetic achievement, though there were dissenting judgements alleging that Pope's knowledge of Greek was inadequate for the task he had set himself and that his translation failed to capture the spirit of the original. One such came from the great Classical scholar Richard Bentley, who is famously supposed to have told the poet "It is a pretty poem, Mr Pope, but you must not call it Homer." Nevertheless, it was widely acclaimed as the definitive English translation through the 18th century and into the 19th. Dr Johnson called it "the noblest version of poetry which the world has ever seen", and Samuel Taylor Coleridge acknowledged that it was an "astonishing product of matchless talent and ingenuity", even while deploring its influence as "the main source of our pseudo-poetic diction".

In the modern literary world, though many classically educated readers of Pope's Iliad continue to find its tone more Augustan than Homeric, it nevertheless has an ever-greater number of admirers. Maynard Mack, while conceding the presence of a few schoolboy errors, found no reason to doubt the adequacy of Pope's own Greek, and much for praising that of his helpers. The literary critic Felicity Rosslyn admitted that Pope took liberties with the original poem, erring especially on the side of grandeur, but nevertheless considered it the first Homeric translation that might have been mistaken for an original poem, the choice of metre suiting his purpose well; she especially admired his ability to match sound with sense, and to find similes which related Homer's world with the reader's. George Steiner considered it "obvious" that "Pope's Iliad is a masterpiece in its own right and an epic which, as far as English goes, comes second only to Milton."
