= Austin Duncan-Jones =

British philosopher (1908–1967)

Austin Ernest Duncan-Jones (5 August 1908 – 2 April 1967) was a British philosopher, with a primary focus on meta-ethics. He was Professor of Philosophy at the University of Birmingham from 1951 until his death. He was president of the Aristotelian Society for 1960–61.

== Early life and education ==
Duncan-Jones was son of the Very Reverend Arthur Stuart Duncan-Jones, Dean of Chichester, and was educated at Gonville and Caius College, Cambridge.

== Career ==
In 1934, Duncan-Jones was appointed assistant lecturer in philosophy at the University of Birmingham, becoming professor in 1951. "In both motivation and style", Duncan-Jones was influenced by G. E. Moore. One of Duncan-Jones's concerns was to endorse the method of analysis he considered characteristic of Cambridge philosophy at the time; with A. J. Ayer, he made his most important contribution in this vein with a paper for a symposium "Does Philosophy Analyse Common Sense?" at the Joint Session of the Aristotelian Society and the Mind Association in 1937.

He was the founding editor of Analysis (this being suggested to be "his most significant contribution to twentieth-century philosophy"), which he edited from 1933 to 1940, until the Second World War intervened, and restarted it in 1947, remaining editor until 1948, and president of the Mind Association in 1952. He was president of the Aristotelian Society for 1960-61.

== Personal life ==
In 1933, Duncan-Jones married the literary scholar and playwright Elsie Elizabeth Phare. They had two children, Richard Duncan-Jones, a historian, and Katherine Duncan-Jones, a Shakespeare scholar. His widow gave his papers and correspondence- including letters from G. E. M. Anscombe, Gilbert Ryle, and Moritz Schlick- to the University of Birmingham Library.

== Works ==
- Butler's moral philosophy, 1952
