= Odyssey (Alexander Pope translation) =

1720s translation by Alexander Pope

The Odyssey of Homer
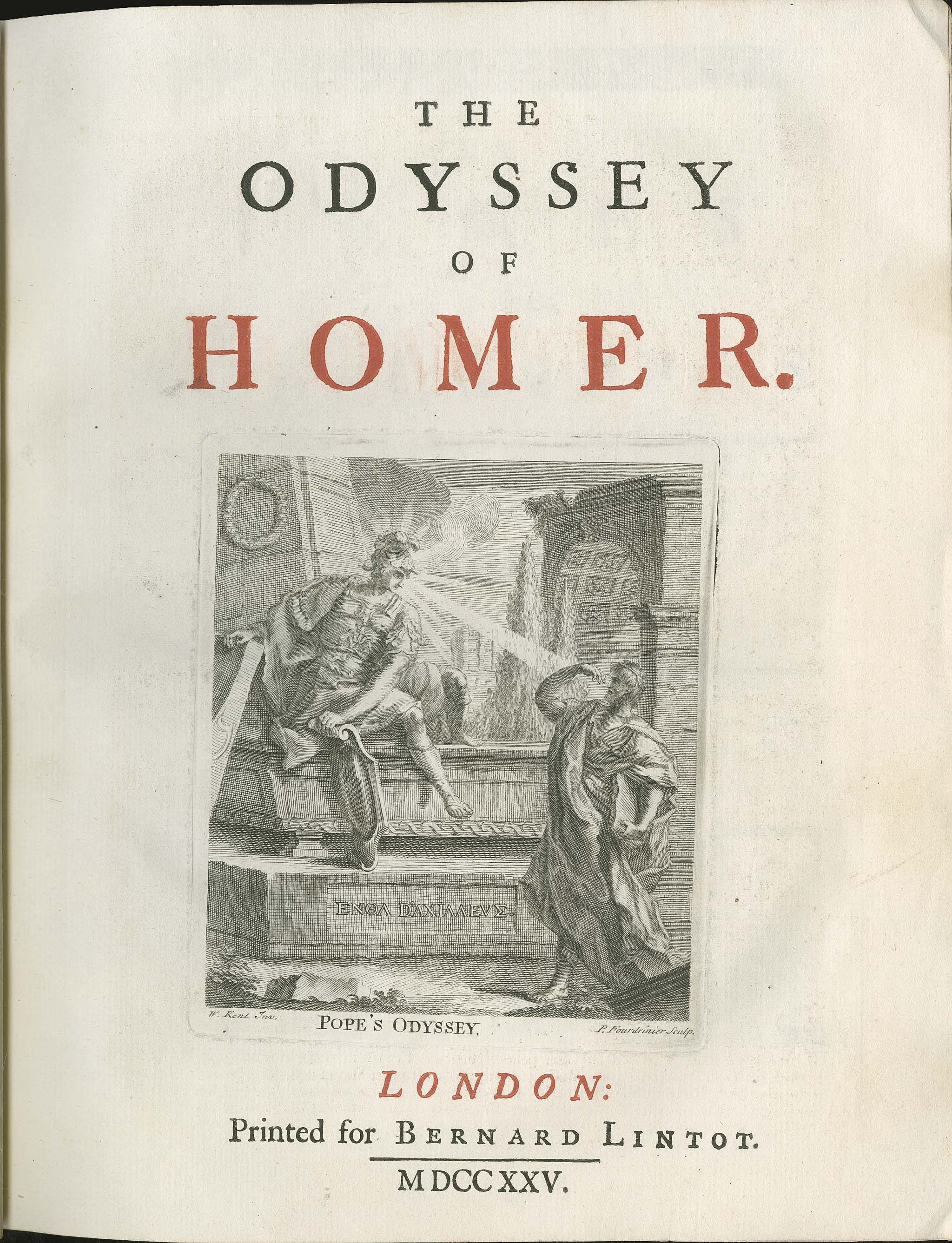
- Title page of first edition; engraving by Paul Fourdrinier after William Kent
- Translator: Alexander Pope
- Language: English
- Publication date: 1725–1726
- Text: The Odyssey of Homer at Project Gutenberg

The Odyssey of Homer is an English translation of the Odyssey of Homer by English poet Alexander Pope. It was published in five volumes between 1725 and 1726. As with his translation of the Iliad, Pope changed the metre from the dactylic hexameter used by the Homeric Greek text into heroic couplets, rhyming pairs of lines in iambic pentameter.

Pope was influenced by the Homeric Greek Odyssey, earlier translations, and the poetry of John Milton. His translations were celebrated during the course of his life and beyond, and made him financially independent for the rest of his life. Pope's use of heroic couplets became a hallmark of future Odyssey translations.

== Background ==
English poet Alexander Pope expressed familiarity with the poem in the Homeric Greek and previous translations in Latin, French and English. He experimented with translation from a young age, with the writer for The Cambridge Companion entry on Pope estimating "sixteen years of [the] young poet's life" spent on Homer and the poems. He derived much about the epic and heroic forms from the work of Homer and John Milton. He was influenced by a French prose translation by Anne Dacier; Dacier's translation Christianised Homer whereas Pope saw him as "the supreme poet of manners". Pope wrote that he faced the same challenges of any "poet-translator", identifying cultural parallels in two wildly divergent historical contexts.

Pope grew tired of translating following his completion of the Iliad, writing to a confidante that it had made him weary and resentful of all prose and poetry. He paid two collaborators to help him with the Odyssey, translating twelve books himself. The other twelve he divided between Elijah Fenton (translated eight books) and William Broome (who translated four and provided annotations). Pope attempted to suppress this information, but it eventually leaked, harming his reputation but not impacting his profits. He was defended by Daniel Defoe, who saw him as a "master-manufacturer", a label which hurt Pope.

== Publication ==
=== Frontispiece and title page ===
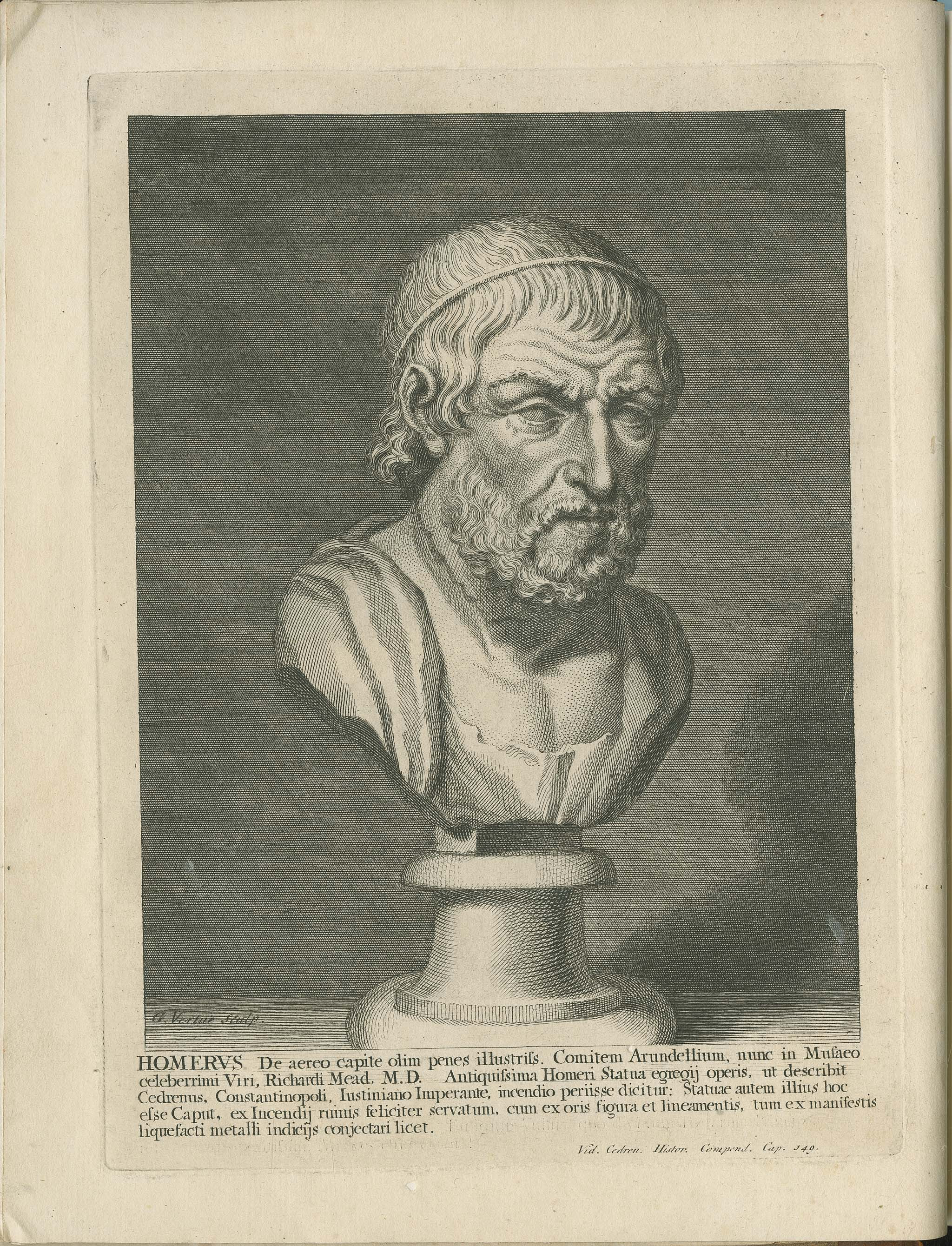
Frontispiece to Pope's Odyssey by George Vertue, depicting a bust of Homer

The book's frontispiece consists of an engraving by George Vertue of a bronze bust of Homer's head from the Hellenistic period. Brought to England by Thomas Howard, 14th Earl of Arundel, the head's arrival in western Europe caused a sensation. As of 2021, it resides in the British Museum. Engraved by Paul Fourdrinier after William Kent, the title page features an illustration of Achilles sitting on a grave while also beaming light towards Homer.

== Reception ==
The Odyssey was an immense financial success for Pope. Benefitting from the popularity of his Iliad translation, it earned him approximately £5,000 (equivalent to £890,700 in 2025). Classicist Emily Wilson writes that it "dominated the market" and shaped how future translators interpreted the poem.

Pope's translation quickly became a favourite of the period. In 1726, historian Joseph Spence praised the translation as, in some ways, an improvement over the Homeric Greek, citing his use of epithets, allusion, and vivid imagery. Pope's translations have been described as the "end of an old era of Homer", being the last translation released before Friedrich August Wolf's Prolegomena ad Homerum (1795). Pope had regarded Homer as a long-dead but individualised artist, while Wolf moved emphasis from Homer as a single author and emphasised oral transmission.

Historian Louis Kelly called the translation "Homer in a powdered wig declaiming in a baroque theatre". To Wilson, Pope's Odysseus is "the ultimate hero of politeness and tact", a king whose deep knowledge of suffering informs his approach to ruling.

Many of the Iliad's detractors expressed similar concerns over the Odyssey, citing poor imagery and intellectual dishonesty regarding authorship. Sir Leslie Stephen preferred Pope's Iliad, reasoning that he had put more time and care into the translation.

== Bibliography ==
- Armstrong, Richard H. (2018). "Review of Homer: The Odyssey". Museum Helveticum. 75 (2): 225–226. ISSN 0027-4054. JSTOR 26831950.
- Barnard, John (2003). Alexander Pope: The Critical Heritage. Hoboken: Taylor and Francis. ISBN 978-0-203-19423-2.
- Bassino, Paola (2021). "Translating the Poet: Alexander Pope's Engagement with the Homeric Biographical Tradition in his Translations of the Odyssey and the Iliad". Greece & Rome. 68 (2): 183–207. doi:10.1017/S0017383521000024. ISSN 0017-3835.
- Pope, Alexander (1939). Butts, J. (ed.). The Twickenham Edition of the Works of Alexander Pope. Vol. 7. Twickenham.
- Damrosch, Leopold (1987). The imaginative world of Alexander Pope. Internet Archive. Berkeley : University of California Press. ISBN 978-0-520-05975-7.
- Gray, James (1984). ""Postscript to the "Odyssey"": Pope's Reluctant Debt to Milton". Milton Quarterly. 18 (4): 105–116. doi:10.1111/j.1094-348X.1984.tb00295.x. ISSN 0026-4326. JSTOR 24464409.
- Kelly, Louis G. (1979). The true interpreter: a history of translation theory and practice in the West. New York: St. Martin's Press. ISBN 978-0-312-82057-2.
- Pope, Alexander (1956). Sherburn, G. (ed.). The Correspondence of Alexander Pope: Volume I: 1704-1718. Oxford: Oxford University Press. ISBN 9780198783626.
- Rogers, Pat, ed. (2007). The Cambridge companion to Alexander Pope. Cambridge, UK; New York: Cambridge University Press. ISBN 978-0-521-54944-8. OCLC 154706325.
  - Shankman, S. "Pope's Homer and his poetic career". In Rogers (2007).
- Stephen, Leslie (1880). Alexander Pope. University of Michigan. New York, Harper & brothers.
- Wilson, Emily (2018). "Introduction". The Odyssey. New York London: W.W. Norton & Company. ISBN 978-0-393-08905-9.
