= Literae humaniores =

Academic major in classics

Literae humaniores, nicknamed Greats, is an undergraduate course focused on classics (ancient Rome, ancient Greece, Latin, ancient Greek, and philosophy) at the University of Oxford and some other universities. The Latin name means literally "more human literature" and was in contrast to the other main field of study when the university began, i.e. res divinae (or literae divinae, lit. div.), also known as theology or divinity. Lit. hum., is concerned with human learning, and lit. div. with learning treating of God. In its early days, it encompassed mathematics and natural sciences as well. It is an archetypal humanities course.

== Oxford ==
The University of Oxford's classics course, also known as greats, is divided into two parts, lasting five terms and seven terms respectively, the whole lasting four years in total, which is one year more than most arts degrees at Oxford and other English universities.

The course of studies leads to a Bachelor of Arts degree which will automatically entitle the holder to the Master of Arts degree subsequently. Throughout, there is a strong emphasis on first hand study of primary sources in the original Greek or Latin.

In the first part (honour moderations or mods) students concentrate on Latin and/or Ancient Greek; in the second part students choose eight papers from the disciplines of classical literature, Greek and Roman history, philosophy, archaeology, and linguistics. The teaching style is very traditional and consists of weekly tutorials in each of the two main subjects chosen, supplemented by a wide variety of lectures. The main teaching mechanism remains the weekly essay, one on each of the two main chosen subjects, typically written to be read out at a one-to-one tutorial; this affords all students plenty of practice at writing short, clear, and well-researched papers.

Changed in the late 20th century, a strong emphasis remains on study of original texts in Latin and Greek, assessed by prepared translation and by gobbet (a short commentary on an assigned primary source). In a typical "text" paper candidates will be expected first to translate into English three or four long passages selected by the examiners from the set books; and secondly to comment on each of an extended set of short paragraphs or sentences from the same set texts; marks are awarded for recognising the context and the significance of each excerpt.

=== Mods ===
The mods (moderations – exams conducted by moderators) course runs for the first five terms of the course. The traditional aim was for students to develop their ability to read fluently in Latin and Greek. The works of Virgil and the two Homeric epics were compulsory, and other works had to be chosen from a given list. There were also unseen translations from both languages, and compulsory translation into prose, and voluntary into verse, in both languages. The course has now changed to reflect the continuing decline in the numbers of applicants who have had the opportunity to study Greek and Latin at school.

Since the early 1970s, it has been possible to begin learning Greek during the preparation for mods (an option originally called mods-B, the brainchild of John G. Griffiths of Jesus College). More recently, due to the omission of Latin and Greek from the National Curriculum since 1988, options have been added for those also without Latin A-level.

There are now five alternative paths through mods.

- Students with both Latin and Greek at A-level or equivalent take the traditional route, Mods IA.
- Those with one such language do mods IB (Latin plus beginners' Greek) or mods IC (Greek plus beginners' Latin).
- Students with a strong aptitude for languages who have not learned Latin or Greek can take either mods IIA (beginners' Latin only) or mods IIB (beginners' Greek only).

Language tuition is now organized centrally within the university by the Faculty of Classics; this leaves the colleges free to concentrate on teaching classical literature/rhetoric, history and philosophy.

The mods examination has a reputation as something of an ordeal: it evolved in the 21st century from 11 or 12 three-hour papers across seven consecutive days into 10 or 11 three-hour papers across seven or eight days. Candidates for classical mods thus still face a much larger number of exams than undergraduates reading for most other degrees at Oxford sit for their mods, prelims or even, in many cases, finals.

Students who successfully pass mods may then go on to study the full greats course in their remaining seven terms. Those choosing the 'Course II' version are expected to read as many of their finals texts in the original of their chosen language as those on Course I; there is, moreover, the option of studying the second classical language as two papers at finals.

=== Greats ===
The traditional greats course consisted of Greek and Roman history together with philosophy. The philosophy included Plato and Aristotle, and also modern philosophy, both logic and ethics, with a critical reading of standard texts. In 1968 an elective 'Latin and Greek Literature' was added; students chose two of the three.

Since then, various combined courses have also been developed including:

- Classics and modern languages;
- Ancient and modern history (AMH); and
- Classical archaeology and ancient history (CAAH).

In 2004 the full lit. hum. course was revised; students examined since 2008 now choose eight papers from a wide range of subject areas:

- Ancient history – "period" papers ranging from the pre-history of Greece to the first Flavian emperors in Rome; or "topic" papers, on such subjects as Gender and Sexuality in the Ancient World or Athenian democracy.
- Philosophy – from Plato's Republic and Aristotle's Nicomachean Ethics to more modern philosophers, such as Kant and Wittgenstein
- Ancient literature – including "core" papers on mainstream Greek and Latin texts, plus various individual authors and other topics
- Philology (classical linguistics) – including such papers as 'Greek from Linear B to the Koine', 'Oscan & Umbrian' and 'General Linguistics and Comparative Philology'
- Classical art and archaeology from vases to buildings
- Second classical language – for those who offered only one language at mods
- Optional special thesis as a ninth paper; theses can be offered within each of the first five options

The regulations governing the combinations of papers are moderately simple: students must take at least four papers based on the study of ancient texts in the original Latin or Greek; otherwise they can choose what they want, provided only that if they offer literature papers, they must offer the appropriate "core" papers too, and if they choose to offer "period" papers in history then they must offer one of the approved combinations.

In the past it was compulsory also to offer papers in unprepared translation from Latin and Greek into English; these papers counted "below the line" – candidates were required to pass them, but they did not otherwise affect the overall class of the degree. This requirement has now been dropped, and it is possible to pass greats without offering any unprepared translation papers. The formerly optional prose and verse composition papers (English into Latin and Greek) have been removed from the greats syllabus entirely.

== Notable graduates ==
- G. E. M. Anscombe, British analytic philosopher, wife of Peter Geach (below)
- H. H. Asquith, Prime Minister of the United Kingdom (1908–16)
- J. L. Austin, British philosopher of language
- A. J. Ayer, British analytic philosopher
- David Beetham, Professor of Politics at the University of Leeds
- Isaiah Berlin, historian of ideas, Oxonian professor
- George Curzon, 1st Marquess Curzon of Kedleston, Viceroy of India and British Foreign Secretary
- Emma Dench, British ancient historian, McLean Professor of Ancient and Modern History at Harvard University
- Peter Geach, British analytic philosopher, Professor of Logic at the University of Leeds, husband of G E M Anscombe (above)
- John Murray Gibbon, Canadian writer
- Barbara Hammond, English social historian, first woman to take a double first
- R. M. Hare, English moral philosopher, Oxonian professor
- H. L. A. Hart, British legal philosopher
- Denis Healey, Labour politician
- Gerard Manley Hopkins, English poet
- Alfred Edward Housman, English classical scholar and poet (failed in finals)
- Frederick Curzon, 7th Earl Howe, Member of the House of Lords, longest serving Conservative frontbencher
- Boris Johnson, Prime Minister of the United Kingdom (2019–22)
- Ronald Knox, Catholic priest, theologian, writer and apologist
- Anthony Leggett, theoretical physicist and winner of Nobel Prize in Physics
- C. S. Lewis, novelist, poet, academic, medievalist, literary critic, essayist, lay theologian, and Christian apologist
- Harold Macmillan, Prime Minister of the United Kingdom (1957–63), read mods (Latin and Greek), the first half of the four-year Oxford greats course, at Balliol from 1912 to 1914. He left to serve in the First World War and never returned to complete his degree.
- Reginald Maudling, Conservative politician
- Iris Murdoch DBE, novelist and philosopher
- Charles Prestwich Scott, editor of the Manchester Guardian daily newspaper (now The Guardian)
- Katherine Parkinson, English actress
- Peter Snow CBE, British television and radio presenter, historian
- Reginald Edward Stubbs, British colonial governor
- Ronald Syme, New Zealand-born historian and classicist
- Oscar Wilde, Irish writer and poet, attained a double first
- Bernard Williams, British moral philosopher, attained a double first with formal congratulations in the second part
- Emily Wilson, British classicist, first woman to publish a translation of Homer's Odyssey into English, attained a double first, top first in second part.
- N. T. Wright, British Anglican bishop and academic
- Yang Xianyi, translator of Dream of the Red Chamber into English
- Count Binface, British satirical political candidate

== In fiction ==
- Sir Humphrey Appleby read classics at the fictional Baillie College, Oxford.
- Detective Chief Inspector Endeavour Morse was stated in the prequel series Endeavour to have read Greats for two years at Oxford.

== See also ==
- Philosophy, politics and economics
- Quadrivium
- Trivium
