= David Beetham =

English political scientist (1938–2022)

David Beetham (1938 – 5 July 2022) was a social theorist who made extensive contributions in the fields of democracy and human rights (including in his approach to the role of not only social but also economic rights) who was Professor of Politics at the University of Leeds.

== Early life and education ==
Beetham was born in Keighley in the West Riding of Yorkshire and grew up in Birkenhead, then in Cheshire. He was the second of three sons of Tom Beetham, a Methodist minister, and his wife Elain (nee Wade). He attended Kingswood School in Bath and gained a scholarship to study at Merton College, Oxford.

Beetham read Greats at Merton. After a short period preparing to be a Methodist minister, he turned to the social sciences, gaining a PhD at the University of Manchester.

He stood for the Labour Party in the 1970 General Election.

General election 1970: Nantwich
Party	Candidate	Votes	%	±%
Conservative	Robert Grant-Ferris	20,397	46.2	+2.4
Labour	David Beetham	15,124	34.3	−4.6
Liberal	Roger Cuss	8,595	19.5	+1.1
Majority		5,273	11.9	+6.0
Turnout		44,116	77.5	−1.8
Conservative hold		Swing		

== Academic career ==
Beetham became a lecturer in the Philosophy Department at Manchester, before transferring to the Department of Government where he became a Senior Lecturer. In March 1980 he was appointed Professor of Politics and Head of the Department of Politics at the University of Leeds in succession to Ralph Miliband. He retired from Leeds as Emeritus Professor in December 2001 following a period of ill-health.

He was a consultant on democracy to the Council of Europe, the Inter-Parliamentary Union and UNESCO. His study Introducing Democracy, 80 Questions and Answers (jointly authored with Professor Kevin Boyle of the University of Essex) was commissioned by UNESCO and published world-wide in many languages. Closer to home, he joined Democratic Audit at the University of Essex in 1992 where he became associate editor, working closely with Director Stuart Weir. Beetham devised a methodology for assessing democracy which was pioneered by the Democratic Audit in the UK and was developed for wider use across the world. Beetham also sat on the editorial board of the academic journal Representation.

== The Democratic Audit of the United Kingdom ==
Beetham was a major contributor as Associate Director of the UK Democratic Audit, based at the London School of Economics. He directed a programme on democracy and human rights for the International Institute for Democracy and Electoral Assistance, Stockholm. Beetham described the democratic audit as 'the simple but ambitious project of assessing the state of democracy in a single country'. It has been applied to assess the extent, and limits, of democracy in the United Kingdom. His contributions to the democratic audit and assessment of democracy led to his appointment as an active consultant on a programme of eight national audits for IDEA (International Institute for Democracy and Electoral Assessment), Stockholm, which led to some two dozen such audits around the world.

Beetham was established as a leading authority on Max Weber by the publication in 1974 of his book Max Weber and the Theory of Modern Politics. He also pioneered élite theory, drawing attention to the writings of Robert Michels. He also made substantial contributions in Marxist theories and analyses of fascism, and produced the famous The Legitimation of Power.

== Marriage and children ==
Beetham married Margaret Newbigin, whom he met at Oxford, in 1963. They had two daughters.

== Death ==
Beetham died on 5 July 2022.

== Key works ==
=== David Beetham (1974) Max Weber and the Theory of Modern Politics ===
This work examines Weber's discussions of the prospects for liberal Parliamentarism in authoritarian societies. This is within an age defined by both mass politics and bureaucratic organization. Beetham argued that Weber's analysis of the class basis of politics means that we should modify some of the more standard interpretations of Weber's sociology of modern capitalism. The book also includes Weber's discussion of Wilhelmine Germany and the 1905 and 1917 Russian revolutions.

=== David Beetham (1991) The Legitimation of Power ===
This work explored the legitimation of power not only as an issue in political and social theory but also with regards to the legitimacy of contemporary political systems.
