= Bee Wilson =

British food writer, journalist and author

Bee Wilson FRSL
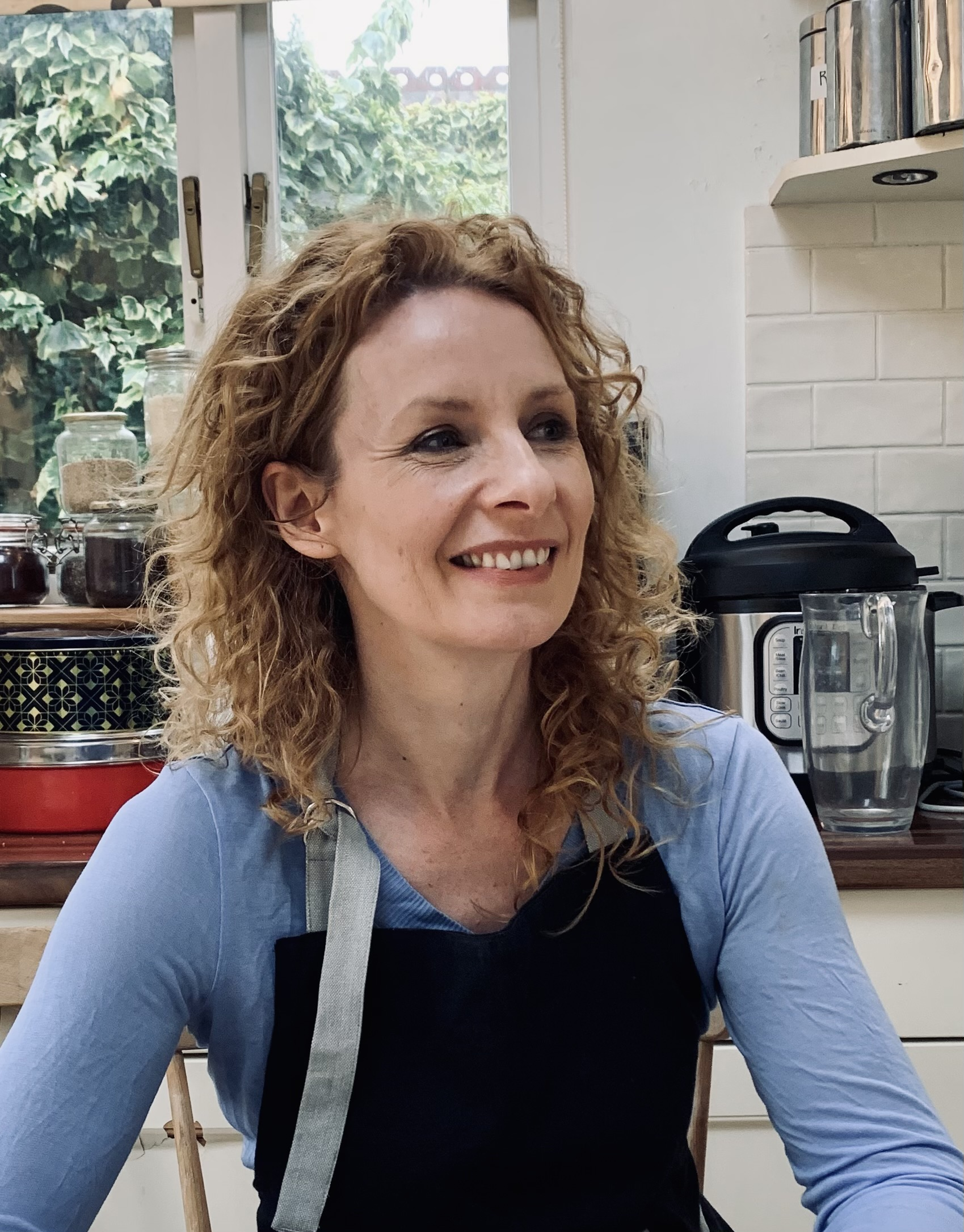
- Wilson in Cambridge in 2021
- Born: Beatrice Dorothy Wilson; Oxford, England, United Kingdom
- Education: Trinity College, Cambridge (BA); University of Pennsylvania (MA)
- Occupation: Writer
- Spouse: David Runciman (m. 1997; div. 2021)
- Children: 3
- Parent(s): A. N. Wilson; Katherine Duncan-Jones
- Relatives: Emily Wilson (sister)

Beatrice Dorothy "Bee" Wilson FRSL is a British food writer and journalist. Until August 2024 she wrote the "Table Talk" column for The Wall Street Journal. She is a campaigner for food education through the charity TastEd.

== Early life and education ==
Beatrice Dorothy Wilson is the daughter of the writer A. N. Wilson and the academic Katherine Duncan-Jones. Her sister is the classicist Emily Wilson. She has said that she learned how to cook sitting at the kitchen table, reading her mother's cookbooks, starting with The Penguin Cookery Book.

Bee took an undergraduate degree in history at Trinity College, Cambridge, where she was taught by Orlando Figes, and graduated in 1992. She received a master's degree in political science from the University of Pennsylvania while on a fellowship from the Thouron Award, and earned her doctorate from Cambridge University for a dissertation on early French utopian socialism in 2002.

In 1997, while still a graduate student, she appeared as a contestant on the BBC cooking show Masterchef, reaching the semi-final stage.

== Career ==
=== Books ===
After a brief academic career as a research fellow in the history of ideas at St John's College, Cambridge, Wilson began writing a series of books linking food to the wider themes of health, psychology and history.

In 2005, she published her first book: The Hive: the Story of the Honeybee and Us published by John Murray. The Independent called it a "sprightly hymn to the honeybee". It examined the human relationship with honeybees and how the beehive has been used as a metaphor for human models of work, love, politics and life. It included honey-based recipes.

Wilson's next book, in 2008, was Swindled: From Poison Sweets to Counterfeit Coffee – The Dark History of the Food Cheats. This was a history of food fraud from ancient times to the present day.

This was followed, in 2012, by Consider the Fork: A History of How We Cook and Eat. This was a history of kitchen technologies, from fire to ice, from pots and pans to knives; to the spork. It has been translated into Spanish, German, Italian, Korean and Portuguese. Wilson's publisher, Basic Books explains that "Technology in the kitchen does not just mean the Pacojets and sous-vide machines of the modern kitchen, but also the humbler tools of everyday cooking and eating: a wooden spoon and a skillet, chopsticks and forks".

In 2016, Wilson's book First Bite: How We Learn to Eat was a change of direction. It was the first of Wilson's books to address the practical psychology of eating rather than the history of food. Its main thesis is that human food habits are learned, from childhood onwards, and that they can also be relearned or unlearned at any age. "The wonderful secret of being an omnivore is that we can adjust our desires, even late in the game." First Bite won the Special Commendation Award at the Andre Simon Food and Drink Awards and Food Book of the Year at the Fortnum & Mason Food and Drink Awards. That book was described in the Financial Times as being "about the pleasure of eating and how we can reconnect with this".

In 2020, her book The Way We Eat Now: Strategies for Eating in a World of Change won Food Book of the Year at the Fortnum and Mason Food and Drink Awards.

In 2020, The Bookseller reported that Wilson was writing her first cookbook, The Secret of Cooking.

=== Journalism ===
Alongside writing books, Wilson has also been a prolific journalist, mostly writing about food but sometimes covering other subjects such as film, biography, music and history. For five years from 1998, Wilson was the weekly food critic of the New Statesman magazine, where she wrote about subjects including school meals, the history of food and ingredients such as vanilla, tinned tomatoes, melons and butter.

After that, Wilson wrote the "Kitchen Thinker" column in The Sunday Telegraph's "Stella" magazine for twelve years. For the column, she was named the Guild of Food Writers food journalist of the year in 2004, 2008 and 2009.

Wilson has written book reviews and other articles for The Guardian, The Sunday Times and The Times Literary Supplement. She has written "Page Turner" blogs for The New Yorker on ideas about the recipe. She has contributed articles to the London Review of Books on subjects such as film, biography, history and music, as well as the history of the restaurant in London. She has written a series of "Long Reads" for The Guardian on subjects ranging from clean eating to ultra-processed food to the history of the British curryhouse.

== Other activities ==
Wilson was the chair of the Oxford Symposium on Food and Cookery from 2015 to 2017.

In 2019, Wilson co-founded a UK food education charity, TastEd, which describes itself as working "to give every child the opportunity to experience the joy of fresh vegetables and fruits". TastEd (short for Taste Education) is part of the Sapere network of food education, which is used in a number of countries including Finland, Sweden and France and which "was created out of the conviction that taste education is good for health".

In 2020, she was one of the judges of the Baillie Gifford Prize for Non-Fiction.

== Recognition ==
Wilson has been named BBC Radio’s Food Writer of the Year, as well as the Guild of Food Writers’ Food Journalist of the Year in 2004, 2008, and 2009 for her column in Stella magazine.

She was elected a Fellow of the Royal Society of Literature in 2023.

== Personal life ==
Wilson was married to the Cambridge political scientist David Runciman, until June 2020, during the COVID-19 pandemic. They have three children together.

== Reception ==
"Be brave. Drop the diet. Make peace. If any book can effect long-term weight loss, it should be this one", wrote Melanie Reid in The Times, reviewing First Bite. In The Observer, Rachel Cooke wrote that "Wilson is a brilliant researcher" and "has unearthed science that makes sense of our most intimate and tender worlds."

Responding to The Hive in The Guardian, critic Nicholas Lezard wrote that "For a moment you may feel, as I did, that part of Wilson's research for this book involved turning into a bee for a few days...You pretty soon realise that there is no dull fact about bees, whether we regard them for themselves, or for the metaphorical uses to which they are put by social commentators."

Writing in The Financial Times, Wendell Steavenson described Wilson's 2019 book The Way We Eat Now as "clear and vital reading...an authoritative and brilliantly compelling description of the economic, political and emotional issues around our food."

According to The New Yorker writer Jane Kramer, "Bee Wilson describes herself as a food writer. That's half the story". In Kramer's opinion, writing about Consider the Fork, Wilson writes on food as it relates to history, ideas and human life. In The New York Times, Dawn Drzal described Wilson as "a congenial kitchen oracle".

== Works ==
- The Hive: The Story of the Honeybee and Us, John Murray, 2004
- Swindled: From Poison Sweets to Counterfeit Coffee, John Murray and Princeton University Press, 2008
- Sandwich: A Global History, Reaktion Books, 2010
- Consider the Fork: A History of How We Cook and Eat, Basic Books, 2012 (history of kitchen technology, from fire to the AeroPress)

Translated into Spanish as La importancia del tenedor. Historia, inventos y artilugios en la cocina, Turner, 2013

- First Bite: How We Learn to Eat, Basic Books and Fourth Estate

Translated into Spanish as El primer bocado. Cómo aprendemos a comer, Turner, 2016

- This is Not a Diet Book: A User's Guide to Eating Well, HarperCollins, 2016
- The Way We Eat Now. Strategies for eating in a world of change, HarperCollins, 2019

Published in the US as The Way We Eat Now: How the Food Revolution Has Transformed Our Lives, Our Bodies, and Our World, Basic Books, 2019

- The Secret of Cooking: Recipes for an Easier Life in the Kitchen, W.W. Norton, 2023
- The Heart-Shaped Tin. New York, NY: W. W. Norton. 4 November 2025. ISBN 978-1-324-07924-8.
