= Patricia Ann Lamkin =

American playwright, singer, songwriter, musician, actor, writer and editor

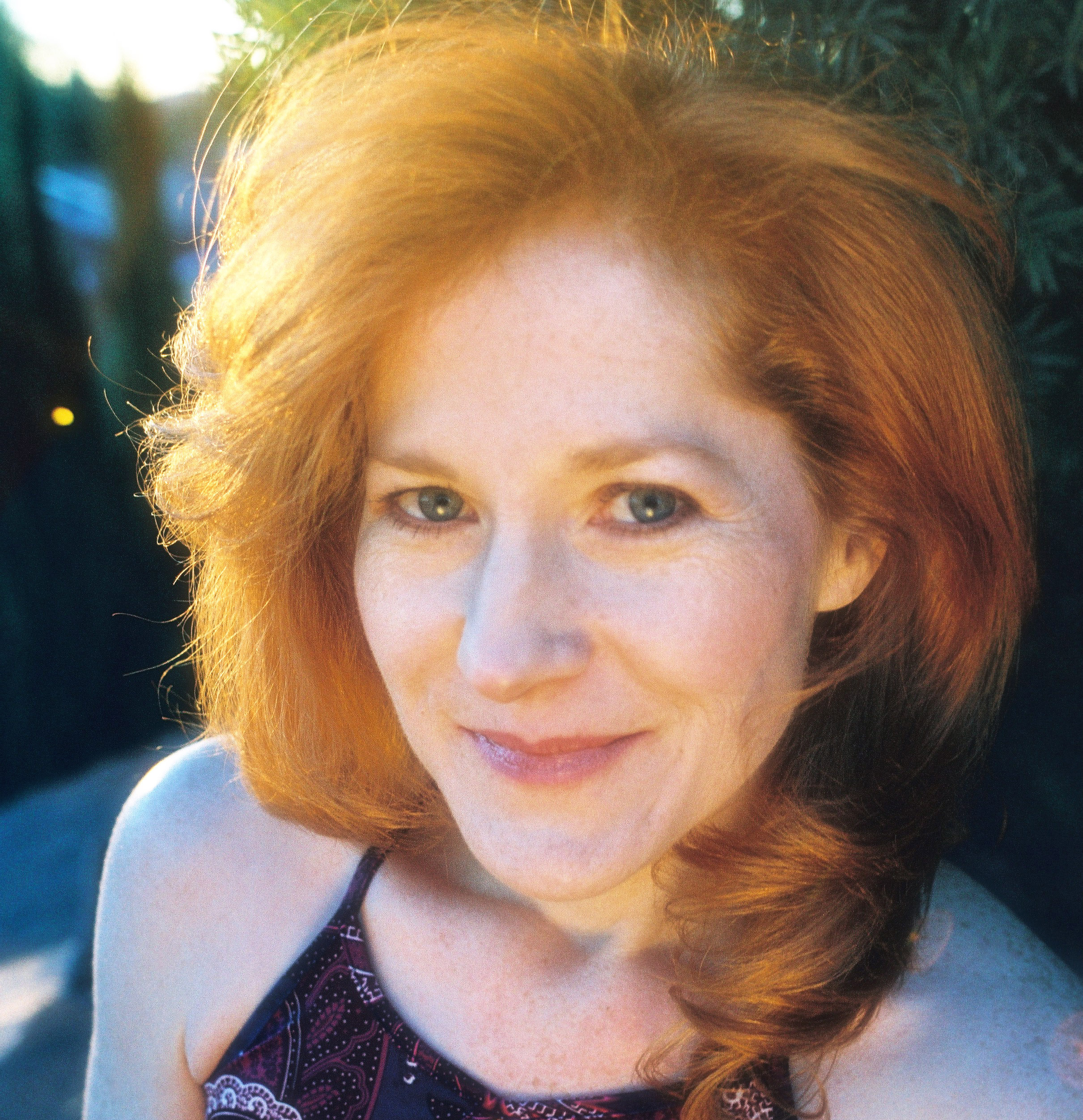
- Patricia Ann Lamkin in Los Angeles 2002
- Born: Patricia Ann Lamkin; February 3, 1963; Frankfurt, Germany
- Died: March 23, 2018 (aged 55); Hattiesburg, Mississippi, U.S.
- Other names: Trish Lamkin; Patricia Lamkin
- Occupations: Playwright; singer; songwriter; musician; actor; writer; editor
- Years active: 1995–2018
- Relatives: John Alcus Lamkin (father); Martha Rodgers Lamkin (mother); Diane Lamkin (sister); John R. Lamkin (brother)

Patricia Ann Lamkin (February 3, 1963 – March 23, 2018) was an American playwright, singer, songwriter, musician, actor, writer and editor.

== Early life ==
Patricia Ann Lamkin was born in Frankfurt am Main, Germany to American parents John Alcus Lamkin and Martha Rodgers Lamkin. After her father's work abroad completed, Lamkin relocated with her family to the United States, settling in Mississippi, where she received a B.A. in theatre from Millsaps College in Jackson (1985), followed by an M.F.A. in Acting from the University of Southern Mississippi in Hattiesburg (1989).

== Career ==
=== Playwriting ===
Lamkin's early studies included time at The Wilma Theatre, Arden Theatre Company, and The Brick Playhouse in Philadelphia, Pennsylvania. One of Lamkin's earliest works was an educational piece entitled Bat Tales in 1995 for the Franklin Institute, Fels Planetarium. Her play The Trestle, a short romantic comedy set upon a narrow train bridge at night, premiered in January, 1999 at the Brick Playhouse in Philadelphia, as part of the Night of 1,000 Plays series. It starred Chris Thompson and Jamila Wheaton and was directed by Lamkin herself. Youth Plays subsequently published The Trestle.

After relocating to Hollywood, CA one of Lamkin's first plays to premiere was comedy Angel City at the Next Stage Theatre running from September 20 through October 11, 2008 and directed by Chris Berube. The play, about a starry-eyed actress and her dealings with a shifty manager and image consultant was part of a collection of shows entitled Hollywood Stories. The West Coast premiere of her comedy T__zan and Jane Share Their Erotic Jungle Fantasies premiered in February 2011 at Three Roses Players as part of The Writer Speaks 11 and starred Julianna Robinson and Mike Sabatino. The play was a parody of the classic films starring Johnny Weissmuller and Maureen O'Sullivan.

"Balancing the Moon" was Lamkin's first full-length play. Set in 1934, the supernatural screwball comedy featured an ancient Celtic Goddess, an Irish love fairy, and a confederation of witches and mischievous spirits, scheming to help rigid, Freudian psychoanalyst Jared Thornhill remember his repressed magical past. The play, directed by Wynn Marlow, had a workshop production at Zombie Joe's Underground Theatre on October 30 and ran through November 20th, 2011. "The idea for the story came from Virginia Woolf's 1929 book A Room of One's Own, says Lamkin. The book-length essay struck a chord with Lamkin as it presented the dilemma of the woman writer who has no money of her own and no time or quiet place to write, because of limitations imposed by her roles as obedient daughter, wife, or mother—subject matter Lamkin felt was still relevant today. The title Balancing the Moon, while at first related to character Charlotte Thornhill's struggle as a frustrated poet and the cosmic influences of the moon on women, later came to echo the lead character psychoanalyst Jared Thornhill's struggle to unravel the mystery of the female psyche through his inner battle between Freudian science and Jungian spiritualism.

Relocating back to Mississippi, on November 20 and 21, 2015 Lamkin held a staged reading of her dramatic play FishTales of the Milky Way during the Faux/Real New Orleans Festival of the Arts. Set in 1973 on the Pascagoula River in Mississippi, the play was based on actual events with an unidentified flying object.

=== Singing, songwriting, musician ===
Lamkin was also an accomplished singer and musician. At the Globe Playhouse in Los Angeles, for Dancing Barefoot's 2002 production An Appalachian Twelfth Night directed by Susan Lambert Lamkin both portrayed a Wise Woman, "performed with devastating straightforwardness", as well as played guitar, dulcimer, and sang "providing impressive authenticity" as part of a 1938 Kentucky Federal Theatre Project troupe. She is featured on Dancing Barefoot's country music release An Appalachian Twelfth Night on the tracks Wildwood Flower, The Cuckoo, and He Will Set Your Fields On Fire.

On September 8, 2009, Lamkin solo performed at the Rainbow Bar and Grill on the Sunset Strip in West Hollywood, CA in an acoustic and harmonica set featuring original songs sung by Lamkin.

Along with Stephanie Bennett and Eva Gordon, Lamkin was part of American balladeer group the Bards of FoDLA. The group's music, featuring Celtic harps, guitar and vocals, was inspired by the spiritual ideologies of the ancient Druids and named in honor of Fódla, one of the three patron goddesses of ancient Ireland. Lamkin's original songwriting and vocals are featured on the title track Sacred Oaks, from the group's album Sacred Oaks (2012) from Harpworld Music Co.

In 2013, working with longtime musical theatre collaborators Susan Lambert and Rob Kendt, Lamkin contributed vocals for the family friendly album O Baby Mine: Sing a Song of Shakespeare (2014) from 134 West. Lamkin and singer Benita Scheckel provide vocals on the track Witches Song.

=== Works ===
Fish Tales of the Milky Way - 2015, Faux/Real New Orleans Festival of the Arts, Staged Reading

Balancing the Moon - 2011, Zombie Joe's Underground Theatre

T__zan and Jane Share Their Erotic Jungle Fantasies - 2011, Three Roses Players, The Writer Speaks 11

Angel City - 2008, The Next Stage Theatre, Hollywood Stories

Teasing - 1999, Delaware Theatre, 10 Minute Play Festival

The Trestle - 1999, The Brick Playhouse, Night of 1,000 Plays, published by Youth Plays

Haym Salomon, a Remarkable Man - 1998–2000, Historic Philadelphia, Inc., Repertory Show

All the World's a Stage - 1998–2000, Historic Philadelphia, Inc., Repertory Show

Last Wishes - 1998, The Brick Playhouse, The Painted Bride Art Center, Best of It

It's a Scavenger's Life - 1992–1995, The Treehouse Troupe at the Philadelphia Zoo Treehouse, Repertory Show

Bat Tales - 1995, Franklin Institute, Fels Planetarium
