= Charlotte Higgins =

British writer and journalist (born 1972)

Charlotte Higgins FSA
- Born: 6 September 1972 (age 54)
- Occupations: Writer and journalist

Academic background
- Education: Balliol College, Oxford

Academic work
- Discipline: Classics

Charlotte Higgins, FSA (born 6 September 1972) is a British writer and journalist.

== Early life and education ==
Higgins was born in Stoke-on-Trent, England, the daughter of a doctor and a nurse, and received her secondary education at a local grammar school which had just become independent. A family holiday in Crete and an influential schoolteacher awakened her interest in classical languages and culture, and she read Classics (Literae Humaniores) at Balliol College, Oxford.

== Career ==
Higgins is The Guardian's chief culture writer and a member of its editorial board. Formerly the paper's arts correspondent and classical music editor, she has a particular interest in contemporary music. She began her journalism career at Vogue.

She has published four books, three of which have focused on the ancient world. Her first book was concerned with Ovid, and was entitled Latin Love Lessons (2009). Her second book was It's All Greek To Me (2010), and her third book was Under Another Sky (2013), which was about journeys in Roman Britain. This New Noise: The Extraordinary Birth and Troubled Life of the BBC, a history of the BBC, was published in 2015. Her book Red Thread: On Mazes and Labyrinths was published by Jonathan Cape in 2018, was BBC Radio 4's Book of the Week in August 2018 and was awarded the Arnold Bennett Book Prize in 2019.

Higgins has served as a judge for the Art Fund Museums Prize, the Contemporary Art Society award, and the Royal Philharmonic Society awards. She is a frequent contributor to Radio 3 and 4 on the BBC, and she has written for The New Yorker, the New Statesman and Prospect.

== Publications ==
- Latin Love Lessons (2009)
- It’s All Greek to Me (2010)
- Under Another Sky: Journeys in Roman Britain (2013)
- This New Noise: The Extraordinary Birth and Troubled Life of the BBC (2015)
- Red Thread: On Mazes and Labyrinths (2018)
- Ukrainian Lessons: Art in a Time of War (2026)

== Honours ==
In 2010, she was the recipient of the Classical Association Prize. Her book Under Another Sky (2013) was shortlisted for the Samuel Johnson Prize, the Hessell-Tiltman Prize, the Wainwright Prize and the Dolman Best Travel Book Award.

In 2016, she was awarded an Honorary Doctorate of Arts from Staffordshire University in recognition of her distinguished career as a journalist and writer. On 8 December 2016, she was elected a Fellow of the Society of Antiquaries of London (FSA).

Higgins was the recipient of the 2019 Arnold Bennett Prize for her book Red Thread: On Mazes and Labyrinths (2018).
