= Wyatt Mason =

American journalist and essayist (born 1969)

Wyatt Mason (born 1969) is an American journalist, essayist, critic and translator.

== Background and education ==
Mason was raised in Manhattan. He attended The Fieldston School in New York, the University of Pennsylvania, and also studied literature at Columbia University and the University of Paris.

== Career ==
Mason is a contributing writer for The New York Times Magazine and was, from 2005 to 2017, a contributing editor at Harper's Magazine, for which he wrote the blog "Sentences" from 2008-2009. He has also written for The New York Review of Books, The New Republic, The New Yorker, Esquire, GQ and The London Review of Books. He taught in the graduate writing program at Bennington College from 2009 to 2011 and now teaches at Bard College where he is a Writer in Residence and a Senior Fellow of The Hannah Arendt Center for Politics and the Humanities.

== Awards ==
Mason won a National Magazine Award in 2006 for his writing in Harper's Magazine. "At once compassionate and ruthless," the judges wrote, "Wyatt Mason seeks an understanding of his subject with endless erudition and a singular, tireless focus on quality. His criticism moves from the specific to bigger game – a defense of modernism and originality – and he’s not afraid to confront the authors with his findings."

Mason received a National Book Critics Circle Nona Balakian Citation the same year. The NBCC called Mason "a critic of unrelenting energy and tough standards. He has exposed scholarly plagiarism, rescued dismissed writers from ignorance and oblivion, smartly scolded faddish novelists...and argued that many of us continue to confuse substance and surface in contemporary writers' work. Masterful at placing writers in dialogue with other writers...he always makes a case for new books he wants people to appreciate, embrace and struggle with."

== Writing on the Web ==
- on R.K. Narayan, from The New Yorker
- on Javier Marias, from The New Yorker
- on David Foster Wallace, from The London Review of Books
- on Satire, from The New York Times Magazine
- on Louis-Ferdinand Céline from The New York Review of Books
