= English translations of Homer =

Translators and scholars have translated the main works attributed to Homer, the Iliad and Odyssey, from the Homeric Greek into English, since the 16th and 17th centuries. Translations are ordered chronologically by date of first publication, with first lines provided to illustrate the style of the translation.

Not all translators translated both the Iliad and Odyssey; in addition to the complete translations listed here, numerous partial translations, ranging from several lines to complete books, have appeared in a variety of publications.

The "original" text cited below is that of "the Oxford Homer".

== Iliad ==
=== Reference text ===
(Homer, c. 8th century BC, Greek rhapsode, Aeolis)

Original Greek

Ancient Greek:
μῆνιν ἄειδε θεὰ Πηληϊάδεω Ἀχιλῆος
οὐλομένην, ἣ μυρί᾽ Ἀχαιοῖς ἄλγε᾽ ἔθηκε,
πολλὰς δ᾽ ἰφθίμους ψυχὰς Ἄϊδι προΐαψεν
ἡρώων, αὐτοὺς δὲ ἑλώρια τεῦχε κύνεσσιν
οἰωνοῖσί τε πᾶσι, Διὸς δ᾽ ἐτελείετο βουλή,
ἐξ οὗ δὴ τὰ πρῶτα διαστήτην ἐρίσαντε
Ἀτρεΐδης τε ἄναξ ἀνδρῶν καὶ δῖος Ἀχιλλεύς.
—
τίς τ᾽ ἄρ σφωε θεῶν ἔριδι ξυνέηκε μάχεσθαι;
Λητοῦς καὶ Διὸς υἱός: ὃ γὰρ βασιλῆϊ χολωθεὶς
νοῦσον ἀνὰ στρατὸν ὄρσε κακήν, ὀλέκοντο δὲ λαοί,
οὕνεκα τὸν Χρύσην ἠτίμασεν ἀρητῆρα
Ἀτρεΐδης: ὃ γὰρ ἦλθε θοὰς ἐπὶ νῆας Ἀχαιῶν
λυσόμενός τε θύγατρα φέρων τ᾽ ἀπερείσι᾽ ἄποινα,
στέμματ᾽ ἔχων ἐν χερσὶν ἑκηβόλου Ἀπόλλωνος
χρυσέῳ ἀνὰ σκήπτρῳ, καὶ λίσσετο πάντας Ἀχαιούς,
Ἀτρεΐδα δὲ μάλιστα δύω, κοσμήτορε λαῶν:
Ἀτρεΐδαι τε καὶ ἄλλοι ἐϋκνήμιδες Ἀχαιοί,
ὑμῖν μὲν θεοὶ δοῖεν Ὀλύμπια δώματ᾽ ἔχοντες
ἐκπέρσαι Πριάμοιο πόλιν, εὖ δ᾽ οἴκαδ᾽ ἱκέσθαι:
παῖδα δ᾽ ἐμοὶ λύσαιτε φίλην, τὰ δ᾽ ἄποινα δέχεσθαι,
ἁζόμενοι Διὸς υἱὸν ἑκηβόλον Ἀπόλλωνα.

Romanization

mēnin aeide thea Pēlēiadeō Achilēos
oulomenēn, hē myri' Achaiois alge' ethēke,
pollas d' iphthimous psychas Aidi proiapsen
hērōōn, autous de helōria teuche kynessin
oiōnoisi te pasi, Dios d' eteleieto boulē,
ex hou dē ta prōta diastētēn erisante
Atreidēs te anax andrōn kai dios Achilleus.
—
tis t' ar sphōe theōn eridi xyneēke machesthai?
Lētous kai Dios huios: ho gar basilēi cholōtheis
nouson ana straton orse kakēn, olekonto de laoi,
houneka ton Chrysēn ētimasen arētēra
Atreidēs: ho gar ēlthe thoas epi nēas Achaiōn
lysomenos te thygatra pherōn t' apereisi' apoina,
stemmat' echōn en chersin hekēbolou Apollōnos
chryseō ana skēptrō, kai lisseto pantas Achaious,
Atreida de malista dyō, kosmētore laōn:
Atreidai te kai alloi euknēmides Achaioi,
hymin men theoi doien Olympia dōmat' echontes
ekpersai Priamoio polin, eu d' oikad' hikesthai:
paida d' emoi lysaite philēn, ta d' apoina dechesthai,
hazomenoi Dios huion hekēbolon Apollōna.

=== 16th and 17th centuries (1581–1700) ===
Translator		Publication		Proemic verse	R
Name	Details	Year	Place	Proemic verse	R
Arthur Hall of Grantham	1539–1605, M. P., courtier, translator	1581	London, for Ralph Newberie	I Thee beseech, O Goddesse milde, the hatefull hate to plaine, Whereby Achilles was so wroong, and grewe in suche disdaine,	
Roger Rawlyns		1587	London, Orwin		
Peter Colse		1596	London, H. Jackson		
George Chapman	1559–1634, dramatist, poet, classicist	1611–15	London, Rich. Field for Nathaniell Butter	Achilles' banefull wrath resound, O Goddesse, that imposd Infinite sorrowes on the Greekes, and many brave soules losd	
Thomas Grantham	c. 1610–1664	1659	London, T. Lock	Achilles son of Peleus Goddes sing, His baneful wrath which to the Greeks did bring Unnumbred greifs, brave souls to hel did send	
John Ogilby	1600–1676, cartographer, publisher, translator	1660	London, Roycroft	Achilles Peleus Son's destructive Rage, Great Goddess, sing, which did the Greeks engage	
Thomas Hobbes	1588–1679, philosopher, etc.	1676	London, W. Crook	O Goddess sing what woe the discontent Of Thetis' son brought to the Greeks; what souls Of heroes down to Erebus it sent,	
John Dryden	1631–1700, dramatist, Poet Laureate	1700	London, J. Tonson	The Wrath of Peleus Son, O Muse, resound; Whose dire Effects the Grecian Army found:	

=== Early 18th century (1701–1750) ===
Translator		Publication		Proemic verse	R
Ozell, John	d. 1743, translator, accountant	1712	London, Bernard Lintott		
Broome, William	1689–1745, poet, translator	1712	London, Bernard Lintott		
Oldisworth, William	1680–1734	1712	London, Bernard Lintott		
Pope, Alexander	1688–1744, poet	1715–20	London, Bernard Lintot	Achilles' wrath, to Greece the direful spring Of woes unnumber'd, heavenly goddess, sing!	
Tickell, Thomas	1685–1740, poet	1715	London, Tickell	Achilles' fatal wrath, whence discord rose, That brought the sons of Greece unnumber'd woes,	
Fenton, Elijah	1683–1730, poet, biographer, translator	1717	London, printed for Bernard Lintot		
Cooke, T.	1703–1756, author	1729			
Fitz-Cotton, H.		1749	Dublin, George Faulkner		
Ashwick, Samuel		1750	London, printed for Brindley, Sheepey and Keith		

=== Late 18th century (1751–1800) ===
Translator		Publication		Proemic verse	R
Scott, J. N.	1703– 1769 minister, physician	1755	London, Osborne and Shipton		
Langley, Samuel,	1720– 1791; Rector of Checkley	1767	London, Dodsley		
Macpherson, James	1736–1796, poet, compiler of Scots Gaelic poems, politician	1773	London, T. Becket	The wrath of the son of Peleus,—O goddess of song, unfold! The deadly wrath of Achilles : To Greece the source of many woes!	
Cowper, William	1731–1800, poet and hymnodist	1791	London, J. Johnson	Achilles sing, O Goddess! Peleus' son; His wrath pernicious, who ten thousand woes	
Tremenheere, William	1757–1838; Chaplain to the Royal Navy	1792	London, Faulder?		
Geddes, Alexander	1737–1802, Scots Roman Catholic theologian; scholar, poet	1792	London: printed for J. Debrett		
Bridges, Thomas	1710–1775, English dramatist and parodist	1797	London		

=== Early 19th century (1801–1850) ===
Translator		Publication		Proemic verse	R
Williams, Peter?	1756–1837, Welsh archdeacon				
Bulmer, William	1757–1830, printer	1807		The stern resentment of Achilles, son Of Peleus, Muse record,—dire source of woe;	
Cowper, William (3rd edition)	1731–1800, poet and hymnodist	1809		Sing Muse the deadly wrath of Peleus' son Achilles, source of many thousand woes	
Morrice, Rev. James	1739–1815, clergyman	1809		Sing, Muse, the fatal wrath of Peleus' son, Which to the Greeks unnumb'red evils brought,	
Cary, Henry	1772–1844, author, translator	1821	London, Munday and Slatter	Sing, Goddess, the destructive wrath of Achilles, son of Peleus, which brought many disasters upon the Greeks,	
Sotheby, William	1757–1833, poet, translator	1831	London, John Murray		
Anonymous A Graduate Of The University of Oxford		1847	Dublin, Cumming and Ferguson	Sing, Goddess, the fatal resentment of Achilles, the son of Peleus, which caused innumerable woes to the Achaeans, and prematurely despatched many brave souls of heroes to Orcus, and made themselves (i.e. their bodies) a prey to dogs and all birds, (for the counsel of Jove was being accomplished,) from the time that Atrides, king of men, and the noble Achilles, first contending, were disunited.	
Munford, William	1775–1825, American lawyer	1846	Boston, Little Brown		
Brandreth, Thomas Shaw	1788–1873, mathematician, inventor, classicist	1846	London, W. Pickering	Achillies wrath accurst, O Goddess, sing, Which caused ten thousand sorrows to the Greeks,	

=== Late middle 19th century (1851–1875) ===
Translator		Publication		Proemic verse	R
Buckley, Theodore Alois	1825–1856, translator	1851	London, H. G. Bohn	Sing, O goddess, the destructive wrath of Achilles, son of Peleus, which brought countless woes upon the Greeks,	
Hamilton, Sidney G.	born 1855 librarian	1855–58	Philadelphia		
Clark, Thomas		1855–58	Philadelphia		
Newman, Francis William	1807–1893, classics professor	1856	London, Walton & Maberly	Of Peleus' son, Achilles, sing, oh goddess, the resentment Accursed, which with countless pangs Achaia's army wounded,	
Wright, Ichabod Charles	1795–1871, translator, poet, accountant	1858–65	Cambridge, Macmillan		
Giles, Rev. Dr. J. A. [John Allen]	1808–1884, headmaster, scholar, prolific author, clergyman	1861–82		Sing, O goddess, the destructive wrath of Achilles son of Peleus, which caused ten thousand thousand griefs to the Achæans	
Dart, J. Henry	1817–1887, East India Company counsel	1862	London, Longmans Green	Sing, divine Muse, sing the implacable wrath of Achilleus! Heavy with death and with woe to the banded sons of Achaia!	
Barter, William G. T	1808–1871, barrister	1864	London, Longman, Brown, and Green	The wrath of Peleus' son Achilles sing, O goddess, wrath destructive, that did on	
Norgate, T. S. [Thomas Starling, Jr.]	1807–1893, clergyman	1864	London, Williams and Norgate	Goddess! O sing the wrath of Pêleus' son, Achillès' wrath,—baneful,—that on the Achaians	
Derby, 14th Earl of Smith-Stanley, Edward 14th Earl of derby	1799–1869, Prime Minister	1864		Of Peleus' son, Achilles, sing, O Muse, The vengeance, deep and deadly; whence to Greece	
Simcox, Edwin W.		1865	London, Jackson, Walford and Hodder		
Worsley, Philip Stanhope	1835–1866, poet	1865	Edinburgh and London, William Blackwood and Sons	Wrath of Achilleus, son of Peleus, sing, O heavenly Muse, which in its fatal sway	
Conington, John	1825–1869, classics professor	1865	Edinburgh and London, William Blackwood and Sons	Wrath of Achilleus, son of Peleus, sing, O heavenly Muse, which in its fatal sway	
Blackie, John Stuart	1809–1895, Scots professor of classics	1866	Edinburgh, Edmonston and Douglas	The baneful wrath, O goddess, sing, of Peleus' son, the source Of sorrows dire, and countless woes to all the Grecian force;	
Calverley, Charles Stuart	1831–1884, poet, wit	1866		The wrath of Peleus' son, that evil wrath Which on Achaia piled a myriad woes,	
Herschel, Sir John	1792–1871, scientist	1866	London & Cambridge, Macmillan	Sing, celestial Muse! the destroying wrath of Achilles, Peleus' son: which myriad mischiefs heaped on the Grecians,	
Omega		1866	London: Hatchard and Co.	Sing, Muse, Achilles' scathing wrath, which bore A thousand sorrows to Achaia's shore—	
Cochrane, James Inglis		1867	Edinburgh	Sing, O heavenly goddess, the wrath of Peleides Achilles, Ruinous wrath, whence numberless woes came down to Achaia,	
Merivale, Charles, Dean of Ely	1808–1893, clergyman, historian	1868	London, Strahan	Peleïdes Achilles, his anger, Goddess, sing; Fell anger, fated on the Greeks ten thousand woes to bring;	
Gilchrist, James		1869		Sing, Goddess, the pernicious wrath of Achilles the son of Peleus, which caused innumerable woes to the Greeks,	
Bryant, William Cullen	1794–1878, American poet, Evening Post editor	1870	Boston, Houghton, Fields Osgood	O goddess! sing the wrath of Peleus' son, Achilles; sing the deadly wrath that brought	
Caldcleugh, W. G.	1812–1872, American lawyer	1870	Philadelphia, Lippincott	Sing of Achilles' wrath, oh heavenly muse, Which brought upon the Greeks unnumbered woes,	
Rose, John Benson		1874	London, privately printed		

=== Late 19th century (1876–1900) ===
Translator		Publication		Proemic verse	R
Barnard, Mordaunt Roger	1828–1906, clergyman, translator	1876	London, Williams and Margate		
Cayley, C. B. [Charles Bagot]	1823–1883, translator	1877	London, Longmans	Muse, of Pelidéan Achilles sing the resentment Ruinous, who brought down many thousand griefs on Achaians,	
Mongan, Roscoe	1825–1909, Irish classical scholar	1879	London, James Cornish & Sons		
Hailstone, Herbert	Cambridge classicist, poet	1882	London, Relfe Brothers	Sing, goddess, the deadly wrath of Achilles, Peleus' son, which caused for the Achæans countless woes,	
Lang, Andrew	1844–1912, Scots poet, historian, critic, folk tales collector, etc.	1882	London, Macmillan	Sing, goddess, the wrath of Achilles Peleus' son, the ruinous wrath that brought on the Achaians woes innumerable,	
Leaf, Walter	1852–1927, banker, scholar	1882	London, Macmillan	Sing, goddess, the wrath of Achilles Peleus' son, the ruinous wrath that brought on the Achaians woes innumerable,	
Myers, Ernest	1844–1921, poet, classicist	1882	London, Macmillan	Sing, goddess, the wrath of Achilles Peleus' son, the ruinous wrath that brought on the Achaians woes innumerable,	
Green, W.C.	1832–1914, schoolmaster, clergyman	1884		Sing, goddess Muse, the wrath of Peleus' son, The wrath of Achilleus with ruin fraught,	
Way, Arthur Sanders (Avia)	1847–1930, Australian classicist, headmaster	1886–8	London, S. Low	The wrath of Achilles, the Peleus-begotten, O Song-queen, sing, Fell wrath, that dealt the Achaians woes past numbering;	
Howland, G. [George]	1824–1892, American educator, author, translator	1889		Sing for me, goddess, the wrath, the wrath of Peleian Achilles; Ruinous wrath, which laid unnumbered woes on the Grecians;	
Cordery, John Graham	1833–1900, civil servant, British Raj	1890	London	The wrath, that rose accursèd, and that laid Unnumbered sorrows on Achaia's host,	
Garnett, Richard	1835–1906, librarian, author	1890		Sing, Goddess, how Pelides' wrath arose, Disastrous, working Greece unnumbered woes,	
Purves, John	1840–1889, translator, academic	1891	London, Percival	Sing, O goddess, the fatal wrath of Peleus' son Achilles, which brought ten thousand troubles on the Achæans,	
Bateman, C. W.	1832– civil engineer	c. 1895	London, J. Cornish	Goddess, sing the destroying wrath of Achilles, Peleus' son, which brought woes unnumbered on the Achæans,	
Mongan, Roscoe	1825–1909, Irish classical scholar	c. 1895			
Butler, Samuel	1835–1902, novelist, essayist, critic	1898	London, Longmans, Green	Sing, O goddess, the anger of Achilles son of Peleus, that brought countless ills upon the Achaeans.	

=== Early 20th century (1901–1925) ===
Translator		Publication		Proemic verse	R
Tibbetts, E. A.	1848–1908, American classical scholar	1907	Boston, R.G. Badges		
Blakeney, E. H.	1869–1955, educator, classicist, poet	1909–13	London, G. Bell and Sons	Sing, O goddess, the accursèd wrath of Achilles, son of Peleus, the wrath which brought countless sorrows unto the Achaians	
Lewis, Arthur Garner		1911	New York, Baker & Taylor		
Murray, Augustus Taber	1866–1940, American professor of classics	1924–5	Cambridge & London, Harvard & Heinemann	The wrath sing, goddess, of Peleus' son, Achilles, that destructive wrath which brought countless woes upon the Achaeans,	

=== Early middle 20th century (1926–1950) ===
Translator		Publication		Proemic verse	R
Murison, A. F.	1847–1934, Professor of Roman Law, translator, classicist	1933	London, Longmans Green	Sing, O goddess, the Wrath of Achilleus, son of king Peleus— Wrath accursèd, the source of unnumbered woes to the Achaioi,	
Marris, Sir William S.	1873–1945, governor, British Raj	1934	Oxford		
Rouse, W. H. D.	1863–1950, Pedagogist of classical studies	1938	London, T. Nelson & Sons	An angry man—there is my story: the bitter rancour of Achillês, prince of the house of Peleus, which brought a thousand troubles upon the Achaian host.	
Smith, R. [James Robinson]	1888–1964, Classicist, translator, poet	1938	London, Grafton		
Smith, William Benjamin	1850–1934, American professor of mathematics	1944	New York, Macmillan		
Miller, Walter	1864–1949, American professor of classics, archaeologist	1944	New York, Macmillan		
Rieu, E. V.	1887–1972, classicist, publisher, poet	1946	Harmondsworth, Middlesex, Penguin	The Wrath of Achilles is my theme, that fatal wrath which, in fulfillment of the will of Zeus, brought the Achaeans so much suffering and sent the gallant souls of many noblemen to Hades	
Chase, Alsten Hurd	1906–1994, American chairman of preparatory school classics department	1950	Boston, Little Brown	Sing, O Goddess, of the wrath of Peleus' son Achilles, the deadly wrath that brought upon the Achaeans countless woes	
Perry, William G.	1913–1998, Psychologist, professor of education, classicist	1950	Boston, Little Brown	Sing, O Goddess, of the wrath of Peleus' son Achilles, the deadly wrath that brought upon the Achaeans countless woes	

=== Late middle 20th century (1951–1975) ===
Translator		Publication		Proemic verse	R
Lattimore, Richmond	1906–1984, poet, translator	1951	Chicago, University Chicago Press	Sing, goddess, the anger of Peleus' son Achilleus and its devastation, which put pains thousandfold upon the Achaians,	
Andrew, S. O. [Samuel Ogden]	1868–1952, headmaster, classicist	1955	London, J. M. Dent & Sons (Note: 1955 rev. by Oakley of incomplete Ogden original)	Sing, Goddess, the wrath of Achilles Pelëides, The ruinous anger that woes on the Danaans brought	
Oakley, Michael J.	1922–2002, schoolmaster, oblate	1955	London, J. M. Dent & Sons	Sing, Goddess, the wrath of Achilles Pelëides, The ruinous anger that woes on the Danaans brought	
Graves, Robert	1895–1985, Professor of Poetry, translator, novelist	1959	New York, Doubleday and London, Cassell	Sing, MOUNTAIN GODDESS, sing through me That anger which most ruinously	
Rees, Ennis	1925–2009, American Professor of English, poet, translator	1963	New York, Random House	Sing, O goddess, the ruinous wrath of Achilles, Son of Peleus, the terrible curse that brought	
Fitzgerald, Robert	1910–1985, American Professor of Rhetoric and Oratory, poet, critic, translator	1974	New York, Doubleday	Anger be now your song, immortal one, Akhilleus' anger, doomed and ruinous,	

=== Late 20th century (1976–2000) ===
Translator		Publication		Proemic verse	R
Hull, Denison Bingham	1897–1988, American classicist	1982	Ohio University Press	Sing, goddess, of Achilles' ruinous anger which brought ten thousand pains to the Achaeans	
Hammond, Martin	born 1944, Headmaster, classicist	1987	Harmondsworth Middlesex, Penguin	Sing, goddess, of the anger of Achilleus, son of Peleus, the accursed anger which brought uncounted anguish on the Achaians	
Fagles, Robert	1933–2008, American professor of English, poet	1990	New York, Viking/Penguin	Rage—Goddess, sing the rage of Peleus' son Achilles, murderous, doomed, that cost the Achaeans countless losses,	
Reck, Michael	1928–1993, Poet, classicist, orientalist	1990	New York, Harper Collins	Sing, Goddess, Achilles' maniac rage: ruinous thing! it roused a thousand sorrows	
Lombardo, Stanley	born 1943, American Professor of Classics	1997	Indianapolis, Hackett	Rage: Sing, Goddess, Achilles' rage, Black and murderous, that cost the Greeks	

=== 21st century ===
Translator		Publication		Proemic verse	R
Johnston, Ian	Canadian academic	2002	Arlington, Richer Resources Publications	Sing, Goddess, sing of the rage of Achilles, son of Peleus— that murderous anger which condemned Achaeans	
Rieu, E. V. (posthumously revised by Rieu, D. C. H. and Jones, Peter)	1887–1972, classicist, publisher, poet	2003	Penguin Books	Anger—sing, goddess, the anger of Achilles son of Peleus, that accursed anger, which brought the Greeks endless sufferings	
Merrill, Rodney	American classicist	2007	University of Michigan Press	Sing now, goddess, the wrath of Achilles the scion of Peleus, ruinous rage which brought the Achaians uncounted afflictions;	
Jordan, Herbert	born 1938, American lawyer, translator	2008	University of Oklahoma Press	Sing, goddess, of Peleus' son Achilles' anger, ruinous, that caused the Greeks untold ordeals,	
Kline, Anthony S.	born 1947, translator	2009	Poetry in Translation	Goddess, sing me the anger, of Achilles Peleus' son, that fatal anger that brought countless sorrows on the Greeks,	
Mitchell, Stephen	born 1943, American poet, translator	2011	Simon & Schuster	The rage of Achilles—sing it now, goddess, sing through me the deadly rage that caused the Achaeans such grief	
Verity, Anthony	born 1939, classical scholar	2011	Oxford University Press	Sing, goddess, the anger of Achilles, Peleus' son, the accursed anger which brought the Achaeans countless	
McCrorie, Edward	born 1936, American poet and classicist	2012	The Johns Hopkins University Press	Sing of rage, Goddess, that bane of Akhilleus, Peleus' son, which caused untold pain for Akhaians,	
Oswald, Alice	born 1966 British poet, won T. S. Eliot Prize in 2002	2012	W. W. Norton & Company		
Whitaker, Richard	born 1951, South African classicist, professor of classics	2012	New Voices	Muse, sing the rage of Peleus’ son Akhilleus, deadly rage that brought the Akhaians endless pain,	
Powell, Barry B.	born 1942, American poet, classicist, translator	2013	Oxford University Press	The rage sing, O goddess, of Achilles the son of Peleus, the destructive anger that brought ten-thousand pains to the	
Alexander, Caroline	born 1956, American classicist	2015	Ecco Press	Wrath—sing, goddess, of the ruinous wrath of Peleus' son Achilles, that inflicted woes without number upon the Achaeans,	
Blakely, Ralph E.	1945–2023, American organ builder	2015	Forge Books	Sing, goddess, of the wrath of Achilles Peleusson, the ruinous wrath that brought immense pain to the Acheans	
Green, Peter	1924–2024, British classicist	2015	University of California Press	Wrath, goddess, sing of Achilles Pēleus' son's calamitous wrath, which hit the Achaians with countless ills—	
Mendelsohn, Daniel	born 1960, American author, critic, essayist, and translator	2017	Knopf Publishing Group	Rage! Sing the rage, O goddess, of Peleus’ son, Achilles— devastating rage, which put countless pains upon the Greeks and hurled to Hades many sturdy souls of heroes, while making their bodies into pickings for dogs and all manner of birds, as Zeus’ plan was achieving its fulfillment	
Wilson, Emily	born 1971, classicist	2023	W. W. Norton & Company	Goddess, sing of the cataclysmic wrath of great Achilles, son of Peleus, which caused the Greeks immeasurable pain and sent so many noble souls of heroes to Hades,	

== Odyssey ==
=== Reference text ===
Poet
Provenance
Proemic verse
R
Homer
c. 8th century BC
Greek poet
Aeolis

Ancient Greek:
ἄνδρα μοι ἔννεπε, μοῦσα, πολύτροπον, ὃς μάλα πολλὰ
πλάγχθη, ἐπεὶ Τροίης ἱερὸν πτολίεθρον ἔπερσεν
πολλῶν δ᾽ ἀνθρώπων ἴδεν ἄστεα καὶ νόον ἔγνω,
πολλὰ δ᾽ ὅ γ᾽ ἐν πόντῳ πάθεν ἄλγεα ὃν κατὰ θυμόν,
ἀρνύμενος ἥν τε ψυχὴν καὶ νόστον ἑταίρων.
ἀλλ᾽ οὐδ᾽ ὣς ἑτάρους ἐρρύσατο, ἱέμενός περ:
αὐτῶν γὰρ σφετέρῃσιν ἀτασθαλίῃσιν ὄλοντο,
νήπιοι, οἳ κατὰ βοῦς Ὑπερίονος Ἠελίοιο
ἤσθιον: αὐτὰρ ὁ τοῖσιν ἀφείλετο νόστιμον ἦμαρ.
τῶν ἁμόθεν γε, θεά, θύγατερ Διός, εἰπὲ καὶ ἡμῖν.

Romanization:

andra moi ennepe, mousa, polytropon, hos mala polla
planchthē, epei troiēs hieron ptoliethron epersen:
pollōn d' anthrōpōn iden astea kai noon egnō,
polla d' ho g' en pontō pathen algea hon kata thymon,
arnymenos hēn te psychēn kai noston hetairōn.
all' oud' hōs hetarous errysato, hiemenos per:
autōn gar spheterēsin atasthaliēsin olonto,
nēpioi, ohi kata bous Hyperionos Ēelioio
ēsthion: autar ho toisin apheileto nostimon ēmar.
tōn hamothen ge, thea, thygater Dios, eipe kai hēmin.

=== 17th century (1615–1700) ===
Translator		Publication		Proemic verse	R
Chapman, George	1559–1634, dramatist, poet, classicist	1615	London, Rich. Field for Nathaniell Butter	The man, O Muse, inform, that many a way Wound with his wisdom to his wished stay;	
Ogilby, John	1600–1676, cartographer, publisher, translator	1665	London, Roycroft	That prudent Hero's wandering, Muse, rehearse, Who (Troy b'ing sack'd) coasting the Universe,	
Hobbes, Thomas	1588–1679, acclaimed philosopher, etc.	1675	London, W. Crook	Tell me, O Muse, th’ adventures of the man That having sack’d the sacred town of Troy,	

=== Early 18th century (1701–1750) ===
Translator
Publication
Proemic verse
R
Alexander Pope
(with William Broome and Elijah Fenton)
1688–1744,
poet
1725
London, Bernard Lintot

The man for wisdom’s various arts renown’d,
Long exercised in woes, O Muse! resound;

=== Late 18th century (1751–1800) ===
Translator
Publication
Proemic verse
R
Cowper,
William
1731–1800,
poet and hymnodist
1791
London, J. Johnson

Muse make the man thy theme, for shrewdness famed
And genius versatile, who far and wide

A Wand’rer, after Ilium overthrown,
Discover’d various cities, and the mind
And manners learn’d of men, in lands remote.
He num’rous woes on Ocean toss’d, endured,
Anxious to save himself, and to conduct
His followers to their home; yet all his care
Preserved them not; they perish’d self-destroy’d
By their own fault; infatuate! who devoured
The oxen of the all-o’erseeing Sun,
And, punish’d for that crime, return’d no more.
Daughter divine of Jove, these things record,
As it may please thee, even in our ears.

=== Early 19th century (1801–1850) ===
Translator
Publication
Proemic verse
R
Cary,
H. F.?
(“Graduate of Oxford”)
1772–1844,
author, translator
1823
London, Whittaker

O Muse, inspire me to tell of the crafty
man, who wandered very much after he

Sotheby,
William
1757–1833,
poet, translator
1834
London, John Murray

Muse! sing the Man by long experience tried,
Who, fertile in resources, wander'd wide,

=== Late middle 19th century (1851–1875) ===
Translator		Publication		Proemic verse	R
Buckley, Theodore Alois	1825–1856, translator	1851	London, H. G. Bohn	O Muse, sing to me of the man full of resources, who wandered very much	
Barter, William G. T., Esq.	1808–1871, barrister	1862, in part	London, Bell and Daldy	Sing me, O Muse, that all-experienced Man, Who, after he Troy's sacred town o'erthrew,	
Alford, Henry	1810–1871, theologian, textual critic, scholar, poet, hymnodist	1861	London, Longman, Green, Longman, and Robert	Tell of the man, thou Muse, much versed, who widely Wandered, when he had sacked Troy’s sacred fortress;	
Worsley, Philip Stanhope	1835–1866, poet	1861–2	Edinburgh, W. Blackwood & Sons	Sing me. O Muse, that hero wandering, Who of men's minds did much experience reap,	
Giles, Rev. Dr. J. A. [John Allen]	1808–1884, headmaster, scholar, prolific author, clergyman	1862–77	London, James Cornish & Sons	Εννεπε declare μοιI to me, Μουσα Muse, ανδρα the man πολυτροπον of many	
Norgate, T. S. [Thomas Starling, Jr.]	1807–1893, clergyman	1862	London, Williams and Margate	The travelled Man of many a turn,—driven far, Far wandering, when he had sacked Troy’s sacred Town;	
Musgrave, George	1798–1883, clergyman, scholar, writer	1865	London, Bell & Daldy	Tell me, O Muse, declare to me that man Tost to and fro by fate, who, when his arms	
Bigge-Wither, Rev. Lovelace	1805–1874, clergyman	1869	London, James Parker and Co.	Tell me, oh Muse, of-the-many-sided man, Who wandered far and wide full sore bestead,	
Edginton, G. W. [George William]	Physician	1869	London, Longman, Green, Reader, and Dyer	Sing, Muse, of that deep man, who wander'd much, When he had raz'd the walls of sacred Troy,	
Bryant, William Cullen	1794–1878, American poet, Evening Post editor	1871	Boston, Houghton, Fields Osgood	Tell me, O Muse, of that sagacious man Who, having overthrown the sacred town	

=== Late 19th century (1876–1900) ===
Translator		Publication		Proemic verse	R
Barnard, Mordaunt Roger	1828–1906, clergyman, translator	1876	London, Williams and Margate	Muse! tell me of the man with much resource, Who wandered far, when sacred Troy he sacked; Saw towns of many men, learned all they knew, Winning his own life and his friends’ return. Yet them he saved not, earnest though he was, For by their own temerity they died. Fools! who devoured the oxen of the sun, Who from them took the day of their return. [Muse, child of Jove! from some source tell us this.]	
Merry, William Walter	1835–1918, Oxford classicist and clergyman	1876	Oxford, Clarendon	— Note: not a translation, per se, but the Greek text with commentary —	
Riddell, James	1823–1866, Oxford classicist	1876	Oxford, Clarendon	— Note: not a translation, per se, but the Greek text with commentary —	
Mongan, Roscoe	1825–1909, Irish classical scholar	1879–80	London, James Cornish & Sons	O Muse! inspire me to tell of the man, skilled in expedients, who wandered very much after he had brought to destruction the sacred city of Troy, and saw the cities of many men, and become acquainted with their dispositions. And he, indeed, on the deep, endured in bis mind many sufferings, whilst endeavoring to secure his own life and the return of his companions; but not even thus, although anxious, did he save his companions : for they perished by their own infatuation; foolish [men that they were], who did eat up the Sun who journeys above; but he deprived them of their return [the day of return]. Of these events, arising from whatever cause, O goddess! daughter of Jove, inform us also.	
Butcher, Samuel	1850–1910, Anglo-Irish writer and scholar	1879	London, Macmillan	Tell me, Muse, of that man, so ready at need, who wandered far and wide, after he had sacked the sacred citadel of Troy, and many were the men whose towns he saw and whose mind he learnt, yea, and many the woes he suffered in his heart upon the deep, striving to win his own life and the return of his company. Nay, but even so he saved not his company, though he desired it sore. For through the blindness of their own hearts they perished, fools, who devoured the oxen of Helios Hyperion: but the god took from them their day of returning. Of these things, goddess, daughter of Zeus, whencesoever thou hast heard thereof, declare thou even unto us.	
Lang, Andrew	1844–1912, Scots poet, historian, critic, folk tales collector, etc.	1879	London, Macmillan		
Schomberg, G. A.	1821–1907, British Raj army general	1879–82	London, J. Murray	Sing Muse the hero versatile, who roved So far, so long, after he overthrew Troy's holy citadel; of many men He saw the cities, and their manners learned; And woes he suffered on the deep; he strove To win his comrades' lives, and safe return. But all his strivings failed to rescue them: They perished for their witless sacrilege, Who ate the oxen of Hyperion Sun; Hence nevermore saw they their native land. Daughter of Jove, help us to tell the tale.	
Du Cane, Sir Charles	1825–1889, governor, M. P.	1880	Edinburgh and London, William Blackwood and Sons	Muse! of that hero versatile indite to me the song, Doomed, when he sacred Troy had sacked, to wander far and long. Who saw the towns of many men, much knowledge did obtain Anent their ways, and with much woe was heart-wrung on the main, Seeking his own life to preserve, his friends' return to gain. E'en so he rescued not his friends, though eagerly he strove, For them their own infatuate deeds to direful ending drove. Fools, who the sun-god's sacred beeves dared madly to devour, Doomed by his anger ne'er to see of glad return the hour. Sing, goddess, child of mighty Jove, of these events, I pray, And from what starting-point thou wilt begin with me the lay.	
Way, Arthur Sanders (Avia)	1847–1930, Australian classicist, headmaster	1880	London, Macmillan	The Hero of craft-renown, O Song-goddess, chant me his fame, Who, when low he had laid Troy town, unto many a far land came, And many a city beheld he, and knew the hearts of their folk, And by woes of the sea was unquelled, o'er the rock of his spirit that broke, When he fain would won for a prey his life, and his friends' return, Yet never they saw that day, howsoever his heart might yearn, But they perished every one, by their own mad deeds did they fall, For they slaughtered the kine of the Sun, and devoured them — fools were they all. So the God in his wrath took awav their day of return for their guilt. [(1903 edition): So in anger their home-coming day did the God take away for their guilt.] O Goddess, inspire my lay, with their tale; take it up as thou wilt.	
Hayman, Henry	1823–1904, translator, clergyman	1882	London	— Note: not a translation, per se, but the Greek text with "marginal references, various readings, notes and appendices." —	
Hamilton, Sidney G.	born 1855 librarian	1883	London, Macmillan	— Note: Not a translation, per se, but a commentary. Edition inclusive of Books 11 – 24 —	
Palmer, George Herbert	1842–1933, American professor, philosopher, author	1884	Boston & New York, Houghton Mifflin	Speak to me, Muse, of the adventurous man who wandered long after he sacked the sacred citadel of Troy. Many the men whose towns he saw, whose ways he proved; and many a pang he bore in his own breast at sea while struggling for his' life and his men's safe return. Yet even so, by all his zeal, he did not save his men; for through their own perversity they perished— fools! who devoured the kine of the exhalted Sun. Wherefore he took away the day of their return. Of this, O goddess, daughter of Zeus, beginning where thou wilt, speak to us also.	
Morris, William	1834–1896, poet, author, artist	1887	London, Reeves & Turner	Tell me, O Muse, of the Shifty, the man who wandered afar. After the Holy Burg, Troy town, he had wasted with war; He saw the towns of menfolk, and the mind of men did he learn; As he warded his life in the world, and his fellow-farers' return, Many a grief of heart on the deep-sea flood he bore, Nor yet might he save his fellows, for all that he longed for it sore They died of their own soul's folly, for witless as they were They ate up the beasts of the Sun, the Rider of the air, And he took away from them all their dear returning day; O goddess, O daughter of Zeus, from whencesoever ye may, Gather the tale, and tell it, yea even to us at the last!	
Howland, G. [George]	1824–1892, American educator, author, translator	1891	New York	Tell me, O Muse, of the man of many resources, who many Ills was made to endure, when he Troy's sacred city had wasted; Many the people whose cities he saw, and learned of their customs, Many also the sorrows he suffered at sea in his spirit, Striving to save his own life and secure the return of his comrades But not thus his comrades he saved, however he wished it, For by their own presumptuous deeds they foolishly perished: Madmen they, who devoured the sun god, Hyperion's oxen, And in revenge he took from them their day of returning. Of these things, thou goddess, daughter of Jove, tell us also.	
Cordery, John Graham	1833–1900, civil servant, British Raj	1897	London, Methuen	Sing through my lips, O Goddess, sing the man Resourceful, who, storm-buffeted far and wide, > After despoiling of Troy's sacred tower, Beheld the cities of mankind, and knew Their various temper! Many on the sea The sorrows in his inmost heart he bore For rescue of his comrades and his life; Those not for all his effort might he save; Fools, of their own perversities they fell, Daring consume the cattle of the Sun; Hyperion, who bereft them of return! That we too may have knowledge, sing these things, Daughter of Zeus, beginning whence thou wilt!	
Butler, Samuel	1835–1902, novelist, essayist, critic	1900	London, Longmans, Green	Tell me, O muse, of that ingenious hero who travelled far and wide after he had sacked the famous town of Troy. Many cities did he visit, and many were the nations with whose manners and customs he was acquainted; moreover he suffered much by sea while trying to save his own life and bring his men safely home; but do what he might he could not save his men, for they perished through their own sheer folly in eating the cattle of the Sun-god; Hyperion; so the god prevented them from ever reaching home. Tell me, too, about all these things, O daughter of Jove, from whatsoever source you may know them.	

=== Early 20th century (1901–1925) ===
Translator		Publication		Proemic verse	R
Monro, David Binning	1836–1905, Scots anatomy professor, Homerist	1901	Oxford, Clarendon	— Note: translation inclusive of Books 13–24 —	
Mackail, John William	1859–1945, Oxford Professor of Poetry	1903–10	London, John Murray	O Muse, instruct me of the man who drew His changeful course through wanderings not a few After he sacked the holy town of Troy, And saw the cities and the counsel knew Of many men, and many a time at sea Within his heart he bore calamity, While his own life he laboured to redeem And bring his fellows back from jeopardy. Yet not his fellows thus from death he won, Fain as he was to save them: who undone By their own hearts' infatuation died, Fools, that devoured the oxen of the Sun, Hyperion: and therefore he the day Of their returning homeward reft away. Goddess, God's daughter, grant that now thereof We too may hear, such portion as we may.	
Cotterill, Henry Bernard	1846–1924, essayist, translator	1911	Boston, D. Estes/Harrap	Sing, O Muse, of the man so wary and wise, who in far lands Wandered whenas he had wasted the sacred town of the Trojans. Many a people he saw and beheld their cities and customs, Many a woe he endured in his heart as he tossed on the ocean, Striving to win him his life and to bring home safely his comrades. Ah but he rescued them not, those comrades, much as he wished it. Ruined by their own act of infatuate madness they perished, Fools that they were—who the cows of the sun-god, lord Hyperion, Slaughtered and ate; and he took from the men their day of returning. Sing—whence-ever the lay—sing, Zeus-born goddess, for us too!	
Murray, Augustus Taber	1866–1940, American professor of classics	1919	Cambridge & London, Harvard & Heinemann	Tell me, O Muse, of the man of many devices, who wandered full many ways after he had sacked the sacred citadel of Troy. Many were the men whose cities he saw and whose mind he learned, aye, and many the woes he suffered in his heart upon the sea, seeking to win his own life and the return of his comrades. Yet even so he saved not his comrades, though he desired it sore, for through their own blind folly they perished—fools, who devoured the kine of Helios Hyperion; but he took from them the day of their returning. Of these things, goddess, daughter of Zeus, beginning where thou wilt, tell thou even unto us.	
Caulfeild, Francis	1843–1934, Canadian pioneer, artist, scholar, town-planner	1921	London, G. Bell & Sons	Sing me the Restless Man, O Muse, who roamed the world over, When, by his wondrous guile, he had sacked Troy's sacred fortress. Cities of various men he saw: their thoughts he discernéd. Many a time, in the deep, his heart was melted for trouble. Striving to win his life, and eke return for his comrades: Yet, though he strove full sore, he could not save his companions, For, as was meet and just, through deeds of folly they perished: Fools ! who devoured the oxen of Him who rides in the heavens, Helios, who, in his course, missed out their day of returning. Yet, how they fared and died, be gracious, O Goddess, to tell us. On page viii, Caulfeild gives the scansion in Homer's "original metre" of the third line of his translation as: Māny a | tĩme in the | deēp [– (pause or 'cæsura')] hĩs | heārt was | mēlted for | trōublē,	
Marris, Sir William S.	1873–1945, governor, British Raj	1925	London, England, and Mysore, India, Oxford University Press	Tell me, O Muse, of that Great Traveller; Who wandered far and wide when he had sacked The sacred town of Troy. Of many men He saw the cities and he learned the mind; Ay, and at heart he suffered many woes Upon the sea, intent to save his life And bring his comrades home. Yet even so His men he could not save for all his efforts, For through their own blind wilfulness they perished; The fools! who ate up Hyperion's kine; And he bereft them of their homing day. Touching these things, beginning where thou wilt, Tell even us, O goddess, child of Zeus.	
Hiller, Robert H.	1864–1944, American professor of Greek	1925	Philadelphia and Chicago, etc., John C. Winston	Tell me, O Muse, of that clever hero who wandered far after capturing the sacred city of Troy. For he saw the towns and learned the ways of many peoples. Many hardships too he suffered on the sea while struggling for his own life and for the safe return of his men. Yet all his zeal did not save his companions. They perished through their own rashness — the fools! — because they ate the cattle of the Sun, and he therefore kept them from reaching home. Tell us also of this, 0 goddess, daughter of Zeus, beginning where you will.	

=== Early middle 20th century (1926–1950) ===
Translator		Publication		Proemic verse	R
Bates, H. E.	1868–1929, novelist, short-story writer	1929	New York, McGraw Hill	Tell me the tale, Muse, of that man Of many changes, he who went	
Lawrence, T. E. (T. E. Shaw)	1888–1935, archaeological scholar, military strategist, author	1932	London, Walker, Merton, Rogers; New York, Oxford University Press	O divine poesy Goddess-daughter of Zeus	
Rouse, William Henry Denham	1863–1950, pedogogist of classic studies	1937	London, T. Nelson & Sons	This is the story of a man, one who was never at a loss. He had travelled	
Rieu, E. V.	1887–1972, classicist, publisher, poet	1945	London & Baltimore, Penguin	The hero of the tale which I beg the Muse to help me tell is that resourceful	
Andrew, S. O. [Samuel Ogden]	1868–1952, headmaster (Note: Andrew was a classicist.)	1948	London, J. M. Dent & Sons	Tell me, O muse, of the hero fated to roam So long and so far when Ilion's keep he had sack'd,	

=== Late middle 20th century (1951–1975) ===
Translator		Publication		Proemic verse	R
Rees, Ennis	1925–2009, American Professor of English, poet, translator	1960	New York, Random House	Of that versatile man, O Muse, tell me the story, How he wandered both long and far after sacking The city of holy Troy. May were the towns He saw and many the men whose minds he knew, And many were the woes his stout heart suffered at sea As he fought to return alive with living comrades. Them he could not save, though much he longed to, For through their own thoughtless greed they died -- blind fools Who slaughtered the Sun's own cattle, Hyperion's herd, For food, and so by him were kept from returning. Of all these things, O Goddess, daughter of Zeus, Beginning wherever you swish, tell even us.	
Fitzgerald, Robert	1910–1985, American Professor of Rhetoric and Oratory, poet, critic, translator	1961	New York, Doubleday	Sing in me, Muse, and through me tell the story of that man skilled in all ways of contending, the wanderer, harried for years on end, after he plundered the stronghold on the proud height of Troy. He saw the townlands and learned the minds of many distant men, and weathered many bitter nights and days in his deep heart at sea, while he fought only to save his life, to bring his shipmates home. But not by will nor valor could he save them, for their own recklessness destroyed them all-- children and fools, they killed and feasted on the cattle of Lord Hêlios, the Sun, and he who moves all day through heaven took from their eyes the dawn of their return. Of these adventures, Muse, daughter of Zeus, tell us in our time, lift up great song again.	
Epps, Preston H.	1888–1982, American professor (Note: Epps taught classics and was a translator.)	1965	New York, Macmillan		
Lattimore, Richmond	1906–1984, poet, translator	1965	New York, Harper & Row	Tell me, Muse, of the man of many ways, who was driven far journeys, after he had sacked Troy's sacred citadel. Many were they whose cities he saw, whose minds he learned of, many the pains he suffered in his spirit on the wide sea, struggling for his own life and the homecoming of his companions. Even so he could not save his companions, hard though he strove to; they were destroyed by their own wild recklessness, fools, who devoured the oxen of Helios, the Sun God, and he took away the day of their homecoming. From some point here, goddess, daughter of Zeus, speak, and begin our story.	
Cook, Albert Spaulding	1925–1998, professor (Note: Cook's subjects were Comparative Literature, English and Classics.)	1967	New York, W. W. Norton	Tell me, Muse, about the man of many turns, who many Ways wandered when he had sacked Troy's holy citadel; He saw the cities of many men, and he knew their thought; On the ocean he suffered many pains within his heart, Striving for his life and his companions' return. But he did not save his companions, though he wanted to: They lost their own lives because of their recklessness. The fools, they devoured the cattle of Hyperion, The Sun, and he took away the day of their return. Begin the tale somewhere for us also, goddess, daughter of Zeus.	

=== Late 20th century (1976–2000) ===
Translator		Publication		Proemic verse	R
Hull, Denison Bingham	1897–1988, American classicist	1979	Ohio University Press		
Shewring, Walter	1906–1990, Professor of classics, poet	1980	Oxford, Oxford University Press	Goddess of song, teach me the story of a hero. This was the man of wide-ranging spirit who had sacked the sacred town of Troy and who wandered afterwards long and far.	
Hammond, Martin	born 1944, Headmaster, classicist	2000	London, Duckworth	Muse, tell me of a man – a man of much resource, who was made	
Mandelbaum, Allen	born 1926, American professor of Italian literature and of humanities, poet, translator	1990	Berkeley, University California Press	Muse, tell me of the man of many wiles, the man who wandered many paths of exile	
Rieu, Emile Victor	1887–1972, classicist, publisher, poet	1991	London, Penguin	Tell me, Muse of that resourceful man who was driven to wander far	
posthumously revised by Rieu, D. C. H.	1916–2008, Headmaster, classicist	1991	London, Penguin	Tell me, Muse of that resourceful man who was driven to wander far	
posthumously revised by Jones, Peter V.	Born 1942; Classicist, writer, journalist	1991	London, Penguin	Tell me, Muse of that resourceful man who was driven to wander far	
Fagles, Robert	1933–2008, American professor of English, poet	1996	New York, Viking/Penguin	Sing to me of the man, Muse, the man of twists and turns driven time and again off course, once he had plundered	
Kemball-Cook, Brian	1912–2002, Headmaster, classicist	1993	London, Calliope Press	Tell me, O Muse, of a man of resourceful spirit who wandered Far, having taken by storm Troy's sacred city and sacked it.	
Dawe, R. D.	Classicist, translator	1993	Sussex, The Book Guild	Tell me, Muse, of the versatile man who was driven off course many times after he had sacked the holy citadel of Troy.	
Reading, Peter	born 1946, Poet	1994			
Lombardo, Stanley	born 1943, American Professor of Classics	2000	Indianapolis, Hackett	Speak, Memory – Of the cunning hero The wanderer, blown off course time and again After he plundered Troy's sacred heights.	

=== 21st century ===
Translator		Publication		Proemic verse	R
Eickhoff, R. L.	translator, poet, playwright, novelist, classicist	2001	New York, T. Doherty	Sing, Muse, of that wanderer who sundered The sacred walls of Troy and traveled Many sea-lanes while struggling for his Life and his men's return. His men, who In their folly slew and consumed the holy Cattle of the Sun, Hyperion, who Therefore spurned their journey home. Now, Muse, begin the tale of that man Of many masquerades.	
Johnston, Ian	Canadian academic	2006	Arlington, Richer Resources Publications	Muse, speak to me now of that resourceful man who wandered far and wide after ravaging	
Merrill, Rodney	American classicist	2002	University of Michigan Press	Tell me, Muse, of the man versatile and resourceful, who wandered many a sea-mile after he ransacked Troy’s holy city.	
Kline, Anthony S.	born 1947, translator	2004	Poetry in Translation	Tell me, Muse, of that man of many resources, who wandered far and wide, after sacking the holy citadel of Troy.	
McCrorie, Edward	American professor of English, classicist	2004	Baltimore, Johns Hopkins University Press	The man, my Muse, resourceful, driven a long way after he sacked the holy city of Trojans:	
Armitage, Simon	born 1963, poet, playwright, novelist	2006	London, Faber and Faber Limited	Remind us, Muse, of that man of many means, sent spinning the length and breadth of the map after bringing the towers of Troy to their knees;	
Huddleston, James	born 1952, American database designer and developer	2006	Northwestern University	Tell me, Muse, about the wily man who wandered long and far after he sacked the sacred citadel of Troy.	
Stein, Charles	American poet, translator	2008	Berkeley, North Atlantic Books	Speak through me, O Muse, of that man of many devices	
Mitchell, Stephen	born 1943, American poet and anthologist	2013	Atria Paperback	Sing to me, Muse, of that endlessly cunning man who was blown off course to the ends of the earth, in the years	
Powell, Barry B.	born 1942, American poet, classicist, translator	2014	Oxford University Press	Sing to me of the resourceful man, O Muse, who wandered far after he had sacked the sacred city of Troy. He saw	
Verity, Anthony	born 1939 classical scholar	2017	Oxford University Press	Tell me, Muse, of the man of many turns, who was driven far and wide after he had sacked the sacred city of Troy.	
Whitaker, Richard	born 1951, South African classicist, professor of classics	2017	African Sun Press	Tell me, Muse, of that resourceful man who trekked far and wide, when he’d sacked Troy’s holy place;	
Mendelsohn, Daniel	born 1960, American author, critic, essayist, and translator	2017	Knopf Publishing Group	A man—track his tale for me, Muse, the twisty one who wandered widely, once he'd sacked Troy’s holy citadel; he saw the cities of many men and knew their minds, and suffered deeply in his soul upon the sea try as he might to protect his life and the day of his men’s return; but he could not save his men, although he longed to; for they perished through their wanton recklessness, fools who ate of the cattle of Hyperion, the Sun; and so they lost the day of their return. From some point or another, Daughter of Zeus, tell us the tale.	
Wilson, Emily	born 1971, classicist	2017	W. W. Norton & Company	Tell me about a complicated man. Muse, tell me how he wandered and was lost when he had wrecked the holy town of Troy,	
Green, Peter	1924–2024, British classicist	2018	University of California Press	The man, Muse—tell me about that resourceful man, who wandered far and wide, when he'd sacked Troy's sacred citadel	
Mendelsohn, Daniel	born 1960, American author, critic, essayist, and translator	2025	University of Chicago Press	Tell me the tale of a man, Muse, who had so many roundabout ways To wander, driven off course, after sacking Troy's hallowed keep;	
