= Carne Ross (disambiguation) =

Carne Ross can refer to

- Carne Ross - British former diplomat
- D. S. Carne-Ross - American classicist
- Joseph Carne-Ross - Portuguese-born British physician and author
- Stewart Buckle Carne Ross - Postmaster General in Hongkong
