= Telemachy =

First part of the "Odyssey"

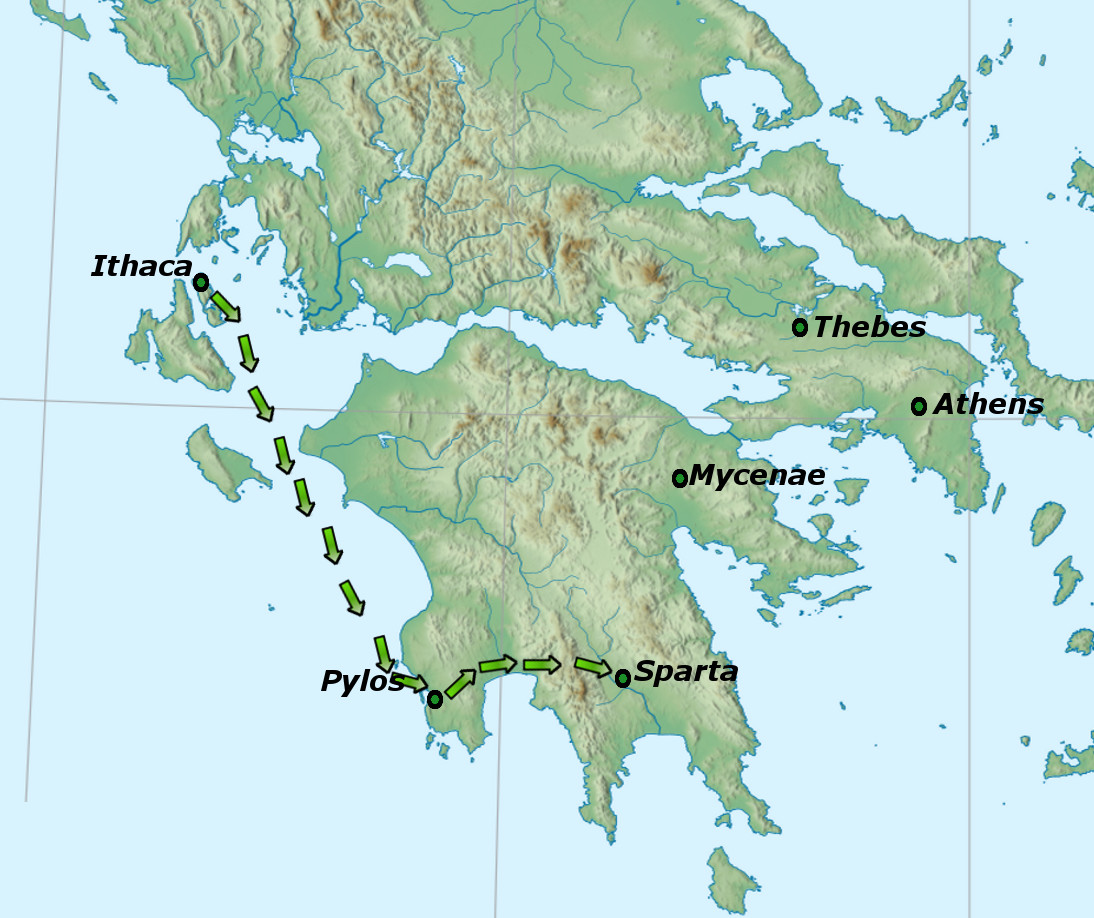
The voyage of Telemachus

The Telemachy (from Greek Τηλεμάχεια, Tēlemacheia) is a term traditionally applied to the first four books of Homer's epic poem the Odyssey. They are named so because, just as the Odyssey tells the story of Odysseus, they tell the story of Odysseus's son Telemachus as he journeys from home for the first time in search of news about his missing father.

== As an introduction to the Odyssey ==
The Odyssey is a nostos that recalls the story of Odysseus' journey home to Ithaca, finally completed twenty years after the Trojan War began. Odysseus, however, does not directly appear in the narrative until Book 5. Instead, the Telemachy's subject is the effect of Odysseus' absence on his family, Telemachus in particular. The first four books of the Odyssey give the reader a glimpse of the goings-on at the palace in Ithaca. There are a multitude of suitors vying for Penelope's hand in marriage, consuming the absent king's estate. They have been a terrible drain on the family's wealth, as they have been nearly permanent houseguests while Penelope put off her choice for three to four years. A brooding Telemachus wants to eject the suitors, and in fact announces his intention to do so; but he is not strong enough to act on the threat. Homer thus provides Telemachus with a motive for leaving Ithaca, and the reader with this portrait of Ithaca to place Odysseus' homecoming in context and to underscore the urgency of his journey.

== Rite of passage ==
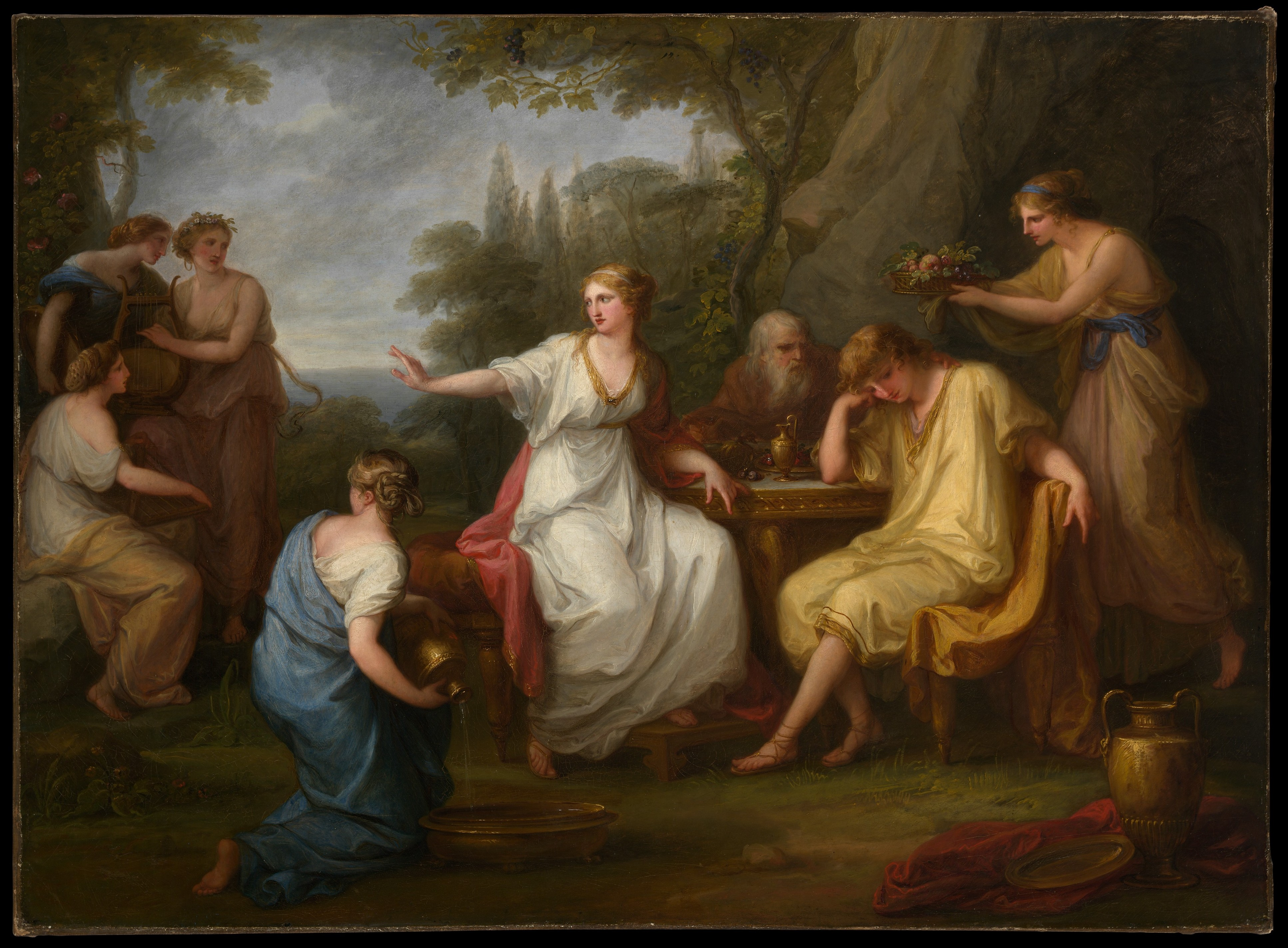
The Sorrow of Telemachus (Angelica Kauffman, 1783)

Homeric scholarship generally recognizes the Telemachy as the story of its eponymous hero's journey from boyhood to manhood. (Note: See, e.g., the 2007 reprint of the Companion to the Richmond Lattimore translation; (Note: Peter V. Jones, Homer's Odyssey: A Companion to the English Translation of Richmond Lattimore (Carbondale, Ill.: Southern Illinois University Press; Bristol: Bristol Classical Press, 1988 (repr. 1992, 1998, 2004)).) the 1993 Commentary to the Robert Fitzgerald translation; (Note: Robert J. Hexter, A guide to the Odyssey: a commentary on the English translation of Robert Fitzgerald (NY: Vintage Books, 1993).) and James Morrison's 2007 commentary, A Companion to Homer's Odyssey. (Note: James Morrison, A companion to Homer's Odyssey (Westport, Conn.: Greenwood Press, 2003).)) It is only after having gone through this journey that Telemachus will be equipped to help Odysseus kill the suitors in Book 22. His first step toward Homer's ideal of manhood is a figurative one: in Book 1 Penelope tries to dictate what songs a bard should sing for the suitors. Telemachus (345ff.) admonishes her, and directs her to go back to her room; this signals the first time that Telemachus asserts himself as the head of the household in the Odyssey.

In Book 2, Telemachus further tries to assert his authority when he calls an Assembly and demands that the suitors leave his estate. But since Telemachus is, in his own words (61-2), "a weakling knowing nothing of valor," the suitors refuse, blaming Penelope for their staying so long. Telemachus then announces his intention to visit Sparta and Pylos in search of news about his father. This first journey away from home is an important part of the figurative journey from boyhood to manhood.

In Book 3, Telemachus is schooled in the ancient Greek social contract between hosts and their houseguests. The concept, called xenia, is simple: the host should offer the houseguest anything he wants, and the houseguest should not abuse this generosity, for he might find himself playing the part of host in the future. Nestor, the king of Pylos, exemplifies this social contract. Furthermore, Nestor's storytelling allows Homer to relate myths that fall outside of the Odyssey's purview. He reflects on the Trojan War, praising Odysseus for his cunning. Telemachus begins to learn and appreciate what kind of man his father was. The story Nestor tells of Orestes in particular serves as a role model for Telemachus to emulate: just as Orestes killed the overbearing suitor who occupied his father Agamemnon's estate, so should Telemachus kill the suitors and reclaim his own father's estate.

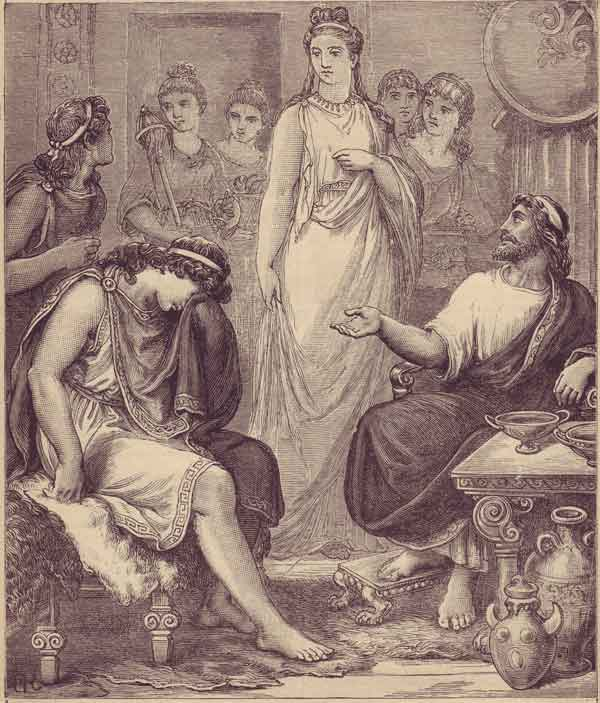
Telemachus in the palace of Menelaus (c. 1886)

In Book 4, Telemachus visits Menelaus in Sparta. Through the story-telling of Menelaus, Homer further narrates myths of the Trojan War that are not strictly the Odyssey's purview. Menelaus tells Telemachus of his own detour in Ancient Egypt on his way home from the Trojan War, during which he learned that Odysseus is still alive, a virtual captive of the nymph Calypso. His wife Helen recalls one of Odysseus' exploits during the war, which prompts Menelaus to tell his own story about Odysseus' heroism in the war. These tales of bravery and cunning both further educate Telemachus about his father, and serve as further examples of heroism to which he should aspire. The story of Orestes is revisited, again, to inspire Telemachus to take action against the suitors. Telemachus takes his own steps toward manhood when he leaves Sparta. Whereas he arrived at Pylos afraid to even speak to Nestor, upon leaving Menelaus he has enough confidence in himself to ask for a gift more appropriate for an inhabitant of rocky Ithaca. Menelaus obliges, and exchanges the chariot and team of horses he had given him for a wine bowl made by Hephaestus. Telemachus then begins his journey back home. But in Ithaca, the suitors have decided to ambush and kill Telemachus before he reaches his (669) "measure of manhood" and begin making trouble for them: in Book 2, Telemachus is considered a boy who poses no threat; by the end of Book 4, they fear his becoming a man who could stand up to them. The Telemachy abruptly draws to a close with this cliffhanger, the Suitors setting an ambush for Telemachus at a harbour.

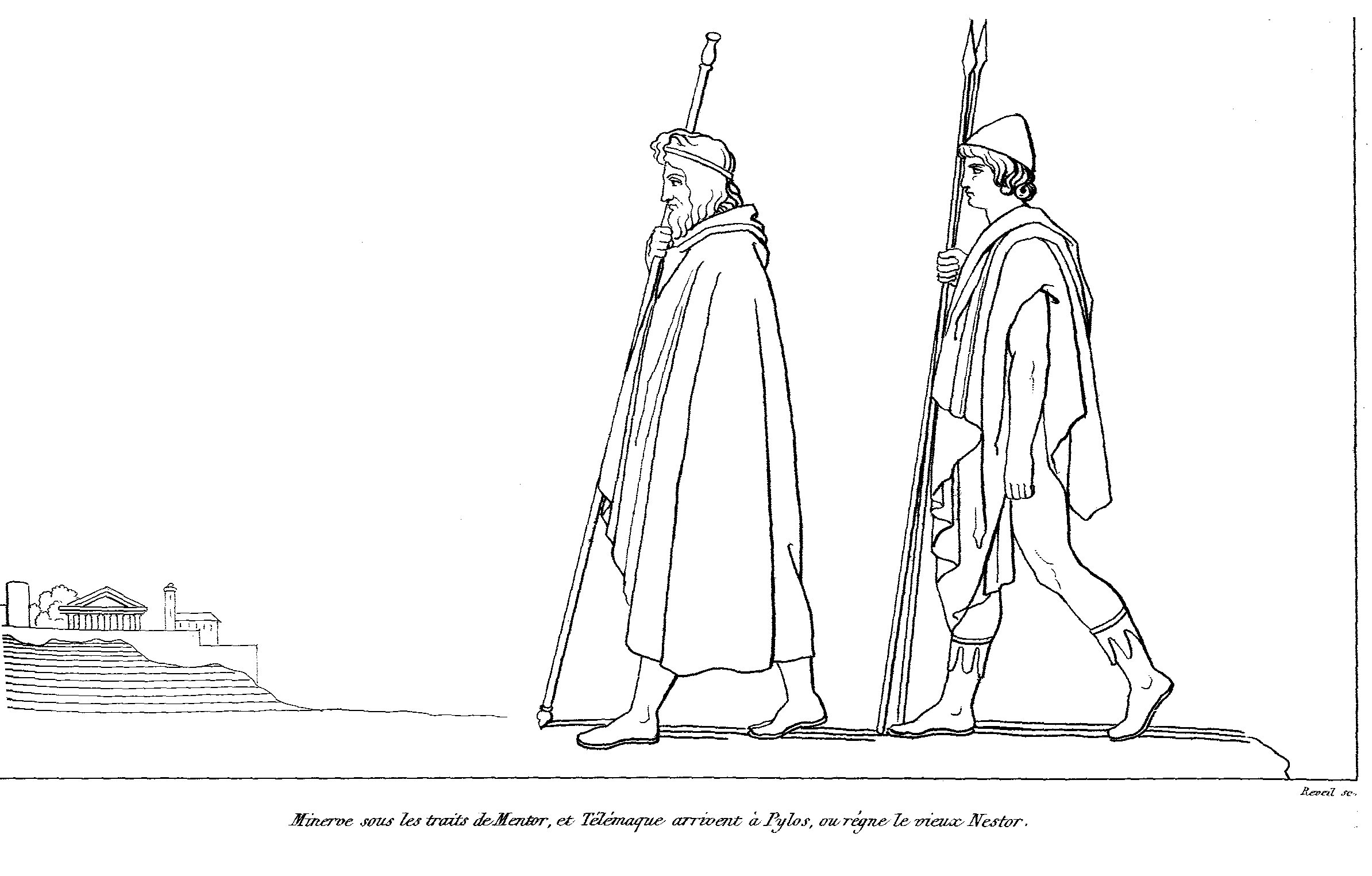
Athena, disguised as Mentor, and Telemachus.

Typically, in the hero's journey he will receive occasional aid from a mentor figure. In the Odyssey, Athena serves as mentor to both Odysseus and Telemachus. In Book 1, she visits Telemachus disguised as the mortal Mentes to spur the young man to action. She alternately advises Telemachus in the guise of a man actually named Mentor—hence the word "mentor" in English.

=== Capstone ===
Near the end of the Odyssey, Telemachus demonstrates his decisiveness and independence by hanging the disloyal women slaves, instead of killing them by sword, for the sake of his honor.

== Foreshadowing ==
The Orestes paradigm treated above is perhaps the most overt example of foreshadowing events in the Odyssey's later books. The stories told about Odysseus serve a similar purpose. In the Telemachy, both Nestor and Menelaus praise Odysseus for his cunning. In telling of his own detour in Egypt, Menelaus emphasizes how the use of cunning and subterfuge were instrumental in his return to Sparta. It was only by hiding under a seal skin that he was able to ambush and capture Proteus, the only one who can direct Menelaus how to reach home. Although the scheme was not of Menelaus' devising, it does demonstrate that while the battlefield inspires bravery from its heroes, wily cunning also has its place when the situation demands. These recollections of stealth and subterfuge point to the tactics that Odysseus will eventually employ upon his return to Ithaca.

== See also ==
- Homeric scenes with proper names
