= Herbert Golder =

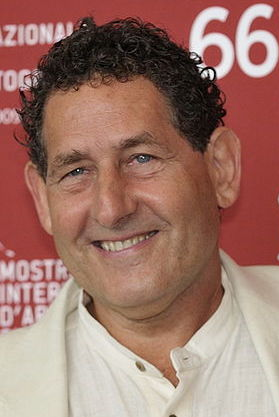
Golder in 2009

Herbert Alan Golder (born October 29, 1952) is an American academic, writer, and filmmaker. He is a Professor of Classical Studies and Professor in Cinema & Media Studies at Boston University, who specializes in Greek Drama, Myth Studies and Cinema. He is also Director and Editor-in-Chief of Arion, A Journal of Humanities and the Classics, published by Boston University, for which he has won the Phoenix Award for Significant Editorial Achievement from the Council of Editors of Learned Journals and the Modern Language Association, as well as the Inaugural Scholarly Outreach Prize from the American Philological Association (now Society for Classical Studies). He served as General Editor, along with William Arrowsmith, of The Greek Tragedy in New Translations, published by Oxford University Press. His own translations have been published and staged. He is currently translating the erotic fragments of Sappho.

He has also worked in film in different capacities, notably with Werner Herzog on ten films, features and documentaries, such as My Son, My Son What Have Ye Done, which he co-wrote and which was nominated for a Golden Lion at the Venice Film Festival. Golder's own most recent film, Ballad of a Righteous Merchant, which he wrote, directed, and produced, garnered him over 30 international awards and many nominations. His current project is L, a feature film, which he has written and will direct.

== Education and Career ==
Herbert Golder was born in Philadelphia, PA, to Ruth and Mervyn Golder, President of the GB Goldman Paper Company. After graduating high school, he attended Boston University as a University Scholar, where was the protégé of William Arrowsmith, graduating summa cum laude in 1975. He went on to do graduate work in classics at Yale University, earning a M.A. (1977), M.Phil. (1979) and Ph.D. (1984). In between his last two degrees, he attended Oxford University as a visiting postgraduate student (1982). He wrote a doctoral dissertation on Greek drama as a performance art entitled, Euripides’ Andromache: A Study in Theatrical Idea and Visual Meaning under the direction of C.J. Herington.

He was a Teaching Fellow and Instructor in Classics while completing his dissertation at Yale University (1977–80) and afterwards moved to Syracuse University as an Assistant Professor of Classics (1982–85). In 1985, he joined the classics department at Emory University and in 1988 moved onto Boston University, where he became an Associate Professor in 1993 and a Full Professor in 2004. In 1990, he relaunched the journal Arion, A Journal of Humanities and the Classics that explores the links between the classics and living culture, which had been founded in 1962 at the University of Texas at Austin by his mentor, William Arrowsmith, and which had been defunct for thirteen years. In 2014, he also assumed the role of Professor in Cinema & Media Studies.

An interest in cinema coeval with his interest in classics, arising from his conviction that if Sophocles or Homer were alive today, they would be filmmakers, working in the most powerful myth-making medium was possess, led to a chance encounter with Werner Herzog in 1988. After a brief discussion about Greek drama, Herzog told Golder he should work in film with him and they started working together that day. Over the years, Golder has worked with Herzog, writing, producing and assistant directing, even appearing as an actor in one of his feature films, Invincible (2001). Golder chronicled their working relationship in a documentary film, entitled, Ballad of a Righteous Merchant, which was shot during the making of My Son, My Son, What Have Ye Done, a feature film which he co-wrote with Herzog.

== Selected Academic Works ==
- The Greek Tragedy in New Translations, General Editor (with the late William Arrowsmith), (Oxford University Press, 1985–96, 23 volumes).
- Arion, A Journal of Humanities and the Classics, Director and Editor-in-Chief, (Winter 1990– ).
- David Strauss, Writer and Confessor, in Unmodern Observations of Friedrich Nietzsche, ed. William Arrowsmith (Yale University Press, 1990), 1–72.
- Euripides’ The Bacchae, Applause Books, 2001.
- Sophocles’ Aias (Ajax) (with Richard Pevear), Oxford University Press, 1999.
- The Complete Euripides, Volume IV: Bacchae and Other Plays, The Greek Tragedy in New Translations, General Editor; Oxford University Press, 2009.
- The Complete Aeschylus, Volume II: Persians and Other Plays, The Greek Tragedy in New Translations, General Editor; Oxford University Press, 2009.
- The Complete Euripides, Volume III: Hippolytos and Other Plays, The Greek Tragedy in New Translations, General Editor; Oxford University Press, 2010.
- The Complete Sophocles, Volume II: Electra and Other Plays, The Greek Tragedy in New Translations, General Editor; Oxford University Press, 2010.
- The Complete Euripides, Volume II: Electra and Other Plays, The Greek Tragedy in New Translations, General Editor; Oxford University Press, 2010.
- The Complete Euripides, Volume I: Trojan Women and Other Plays, The Greek Tragedy in New Translations, General Editor; Oxford University Press, 2010.
- The Complete Sophocles, Volume I: The Theban Plays, The Greek Tragedy in New Translations, General Editor; Oxford University Press, 2011.
- The Complete Aeschylus, Volume I: The Oresteia, The Greek Tragedy in New Translations, General Editor; Oxford University Press, 2011.
- The Complete Euripides, Volume V: Medea and Other Plays, The Greek Tragedy in New Translations, General Editor; Oxford University Press, 2011.
- Euripides’ Cyclops, Arion, 2024.

== Selected Film Works ==
- Little Dieter Needs to Fly, Assistant Director to Werner Herzog, Archival Research, and Post-Production Supervision (1997)
  - Primetime Emmy Award Nomination, Best Nonfiction Special, 1999.
  - Golden Apple, National Educational Media Network, 1999.
  - Silver FIPA, Biarritz International Festival of Audiovisual Programming, 1999.
  - Golden Spire, San Francisco International Film Festival-Winner, 1999.
  - Best Documentary, Runner-up, National Society of Film Critics US, 1998.
  - Distinguished Achievement Award for Feature, International Documentary Association, 1998.
  - Special Jury Award, Amsterdam International Documentary Film Festival, 1997.
  - Academy Award (Oscar) Nomination Shortlist, 1998.
  - Best Non-Fiction Film Nomination, National Society of Film Critics, 1999.
  - Sierra Award Nomination, Las Vegas Film Critics Society Awards, 2000.
  - Film of Superior Artistic Merit, Fajr International Film Festival, Tehran, 2000.
  - Official Selection, Telluride Film Festival, 1997 (and invited and honored by more than 40 International Film Festivals Worldwide).
- My Best Fiend, Assistant Director to Werner Herzog and English dubbing (1999)
  - Best Documentary Award (nominated), European Film Awards, 1999.
  - Audience Award, São Paulo International Film Festival, 1999.
  - Gold Hugo (nominated), Chicago International Film Festival, 1999.
  - Special Invitation, “Out-of-Competition,” Cannes Film Festival, 1999.
  - Official Selection, Telluride Film Festival, 1999 (and numerous festivals in the US and abroad).
- The Lord and the Laden, Assistant Director to Werner Herzog (1999)
  - Official Selection, Telluride Film Festival, 2000.
- Wings of Hope, Assistant Director to Werner Herzog (1998)
  - Official Selection, Telluride Film Festival, 1999.
- Invincible, Writer (English adaptation), Actor, and assistant director to Werner Herzog (2001)
  - Named “Top-Ten” film of 2002 (Roger Ebert).
  - Named “Top-Ten” film of 2002 by Los Angeles Film Critics (LA Weekly).
  - Official Selection, Venice International Film Festival, 2001.
  - Official Selection, Toronto International Film Festival, 2001.
  - Official Selection, Montreal International Film Festival, 2002.
- Christ and the Demons in New Spain (2002)
- The White Diamond, Archival Film and Research (2004)
  - Premi Speciali, 66th Locarno International Film Festival, 2013.
  - New York Film Critics Circle Award for Best Non-Fiction Film, 2005.
  - Best Documentary, Copenhagen International Documentary Film Festival, 2005.
  - Ranked Best Film (all categories) of 2005 (Time Magazine, Richard Corliss).
  - Eight film critics’ Best Ten Films lists for 2005.
  - Ranked Best-Reviewed Movies of 2005 (#13—all categories).
  - Best Documentary Film Nomination, Cinemarati Awards, 2006.
- The Wild Blue Yonder, Archival Film and Research (2005)
  - Premi Speciali, 66th Locarno International Film Festival, 2013.
  - FIPRESCI Award Biennale Venice 2005, The International Critics Prize of the International Federation of Film Critics, Venice International Film Festival, 2005.
  - Carnet Jove – Special Mention (Won), Stiges-Catalonian International Film Festival, 2005.
  - Best Film Nomination, Stiges-Catalonian International Film Festival, 2005.
  - Grand Prize Nomination, Tallinn Black Nights Film Festival, 2005.
  - Best Film Nomination, Mar del Plata Film Festival, 2006.
- Rescue Dawn, Archival Footage (2006)
- My Son, My Son, What Have Ye Done, Co-Writer and Associate Producer (2009)
  - The 10 Best Hollywood Movies Made by Non-Hollywood Directors, #2, www.tasteofcinema.com, June 2015.
  - Premi Speciali, 66th Locarno International Film Festival, 2013.
  - Golden Lion (Nominated), Venice International Film Festival, 2009.
  - Grand Jury Prize (Nominated, plus five other nominations), Venice International Film Festival, 2009.
  - Official Selection, Telluride Film Festival, 2009.
  - Official Selection, Toronto International Film Festival, 2009.
  - Official Selection, Rotterdam International Film Festival, 2010.
  - Official Selection, Edinburgh International Film Festival, 2010.
  - Five Stars, Time Out New York, Time Out London, 2009.
- Ballad of a Righteous Merchant, Writer, Director, Producer (2017)
  - Multiple awards, including Best Feature Documentary, Best Director, and Best of the Fest, etc.
