= Samuel Ogden Andrew =

British educator and scholar (1868–1952)

- Born: January 8, 1868; Oldham, Lancashire
- Died: 1952
- Education: Oriel College, Oxford
- Occupation: Teacher

Samuel Ogden Andrew (1868–1952) (the 'S. O. Andrew' of academic publications) was an English classical and Anglo-Saxon scholar, translator and headmaster, known for his verse translations of The Iliad (1938, selections) and The Odyssey (1948, complete) and of Sir Gawain and the Green Knight (1931). He was also known for his books on classics and mathematics for school use.

== Life and career ==
Eldest son of Samuel and Mary Andrew (née Ogden), S. O. Andrew was born in Oldham in 1868 and educated at Manchester Grammar School. He won a scholarship to read classics at Oriel College, Oxford, where he took a double first in Literae humaniores in 1890. After a year studying psychology in Germany he was appointed assistant classics master at Llandovery College, Carmarthenshire (1892 – 1895), then first headmaster of the modern era of Oldham Hulme Grammar School (1895 – 1902). From 1902 to 1928 he was headmaster of Whitgift School, Croydon, Surrey. Andrew married Lilian Pullinger; they had three children and lived at Sanderstead, Surrey.

== Reception ==
Andrew's translations of Homer were praised for combining fidelity to the text with a swift metre close to the original. "I could read his verse at long stretches with attention and even (for an old worshipper of Homer) much pleasurable excitement," wrote Sir Arthur Quiller-Couch in 1937, "my tribute at once to Mr Andrew's clear rendering of the text and to his invention of a verse-form which carries one along". Quiller-Couch believed that Andrew had "hit on" the nearest English equivalent to Homer's spoudaiotes [σπουδαιότης], "the combined majesty and rush as of a wind", free from the distracting associations of blank verse and heroic couplets. Andrew discusses his verse-form in 'A Note on the Metre', appended to his The Wrath of Achilles (1938). His Homer was chosen for the Everyman's Library, The Odyssey in full, The Iliad completed by M.J. Oakley. "On authoritative opinion," wrote his publisher of the first, "we believe that this translation conveys the simplicity and nobility of the Greek text to a high degree." Andrew's verse-translation of Sir Gawain and the Green Knight received similar commendation, the Manchester Guardian writing: "Mr Andrew, who must have a Lancashire man's lifelong devotion to the poem, has fashioned a style and diction and a mode of verse which allows him to make a rendering which preserves more of the original charm than any other way of translating could do."

== Publications ==
=== Academic ===
- Greek Prose Composition (1902)
- Greek Versions of 'Greek Prose Composition' (1902)
- Geometry (1903)
- Practical Arithmetic: an Introduction to Elementary Mathematics; with A. Consterdine (1905)
- Praeceptor: A Master's Book (Oxford University Press, 1913)
- The Old English Alliterative Measure (1931)
- Syntax and Style in Old English (Cambridge University Press, 1940)
- Postscript on 'Beowulf' (Cambridge University Press, 1948)

=== Translations ===
- Sir Gawain and the Green Knight: A modern version of the 14th century alliterative poem in the original metre (Dent, 1929)
- The Wrath of Achilles: Translated from 'Iliad' I, XI, XVI to XXIV; with A Note on the Metre (Dent, 1938; Preface by Sir Arthur Quiller-Couch)
- Homer: The Odyssey (Dent, 1948; cover illustration by Eric Fraser); reissued in 1953 as Everyman Library no. 454, with Introduction by John Warrington
- Homer: The Iliad (translated by S.O. Andrew and M.J. Oakley; Everyman Library no 453 with Introduction by John Warrington; Preface by M.J. Oakley) (1953)

== Metre ==
Andrew believed his Homer-metre "new". "If we go to Homer," he wrote, "and count, not the number of long syllables but the number of stress-words in a line, we find that in at least three lines out of four this number is five." Accordingly, he chose an accentual, five-stress "hexameter", with, usually, hypermetric unstressed syllables at beginning or end or both. Purely dactylic lines are very rare in his version. "Experience has led me," he noted, "to adopt the rule that at least two feet, the fourth and one other, must be dactyls". Examples:

Six feet:            ( ⏑ ⏑ ) | –  ⏑ |  – ⏑ ⏑ |  – ⏑ | –  ⏑ ⏑| – ( ⏑ )
Five stresses ( / ):   - -     /  -   / - -    / -   /  - -  /   -

But the blessèd Gods beholding had pity on Hector

- - / - / - / - - / - - / -   

That his wife and mother and child upon him might look

- - / - / - - / - / - - /             

Oft he turn'd on his side and often he lay

/ - / - - / - / - - / 

"Important variants": (1) The penultimate foot may be a spondee or trochee, in which case the foot preceding must be a dactyl. (2) The first foot may be inverted. (3) An initial spondee may be followed by a rising (iambic-anapaestic) rhythm: " Nine days they lay in their blood... ". In addition he varied caesura position and used run-on lines and counterpoint. "A long unstressed ( \ ) or a weakly-stressed syllable ( \ ) is sometimes allowed to take the stress by transference", e.g. "omnipotent" ( \ / - - ). Ditto when a long stressed syllable is preceded by a long more weakly stressed one ( \ ), e.g. "libation" ( \ / - ), "unransom'd" ( \ / - ), "Idaeus" ( \ / - ).

Andrew rejected more regular dactylic hexameters (as used, for example, by Cotterill) because of their monotony and artificiality, and because the natural structure and rhythm of English, with its many monosyllabic stress-words and rising rhythm, meant that an English Homer must accommodate both rising and falling rhythms. He rejected blank verse and heroic couplets because of their non-Homeric literary associations.

== See also ==
- English translations of Homer#AndrewOd
