= Odyssey (Richmond Lattimore translation) =

1967 translation of Homer

The Odyssey
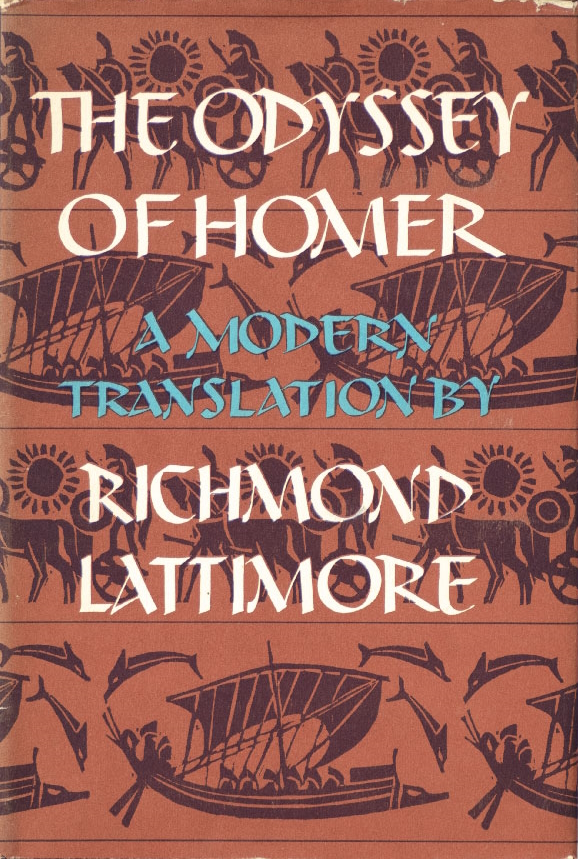
- First edition cover by Guy Fleming
- Author: Richmond Lattimore
- Publisher: Harper and Row
- Publication date: 1965

The Odyssey of Homer is an English translation of the Odyssey of Homer by American classicist Richmond Lattimore, published in 1965. Lattimore's faithfulness to the original Homeric Greek, to some extent echoing the original in its use of repeated epithets, made it a staple of undergraduate classical studies programmes.

== Content ==
=== Style ===
Lattimore matched the dactylic hexameter of the original Homeric text; it is regarded as a generally faithful line-for-line translation. Previous translations favoured rendering the poetic metre of the original into a metre regularly used in the target language, a decision made by Lattimore's contemporary Robert Fitzgerald for his translation – although others, such as those by Samuel Butler and E. V. Rieu, had used prose. Lattimore's translation is written in free verse, with a "loose six-beat rhythm".

Lattimore's translation echoed much of the original text's repetition, an important feature of the poem's origins in oral tradition. Lattimore did remove some epithets for stylistic purposes, but one critic said the translation reproduced most of them.

== Publication ==
The book was first published in 1965 by Harper and Row. The cover of the book, which incorporates a woodcut of Odysseus' boat based on the Dionysus Cup, was designed by Guy Fleming.

== Reception ==
Lattimore's translation was widely commended for its fidelity to the Homeric Greek and it remains a staple of literature classes.

The translation's faithfulness has been questioned by modern scholars. D. S. Carne-Ross, an eminent 20th-century translation critic, judged the translation very harshly. Among other reasons, Carne-Ross cited Lattimore's description of Odysseus building a raft and the removal of some key epithets. Classicist and 2017 Odyssey translator Emily Wilson concurred with much of Carne-Ross' analysis, but expressed caveats about his lack of historical contextualization, and noted that some readers enjoyed Lattimore's use of repetition.

== Bibliography ==
- Dimock, George (1967). Lattimore, Richmond (ed.). "The Best Yet: Lattimore's Odyssey". The Hudson Review. 20 (4): 702–706. doi:10.2307/3849586. ISSN 0018-702X.
- Gibson, Richard Hughes (2019). "On Women Englishing Homer". Arion: A Journal of Humanities and the Classics. 26 (3): 35–68. doi:10.2307/arion.26.3.0035. ISSN 0095-5809.
- Jones, Peter V. (1996). Homer's Odyssey: A Companion to the English translation of Richmond Lattimore. Classical studies series (Repr ed.). Bristol: Bristol Classical Press. ISBN 978-1-85399-038-0.
- Reid, David; Jerald, Jonathan (1988). Pure Silver: The Second Best of Everything. Harcourt Brace Jovanovich. ISBN 978-0-15-679960-7.
- Rogakos, Megakles (2023). Sex & Drugs & Rock’n’Roll A moral Odyssey retold by Homer, Joyce and Duchamp (PDF). Corfu: Corfu Heritage Foundation. ISBN 978-960-296-407-1.
- Wilson, Emily (2012). "Review of Classics and Translation: Essays". Translation and Literature. 21 (1): 72–78. ISSN 0968-1361.
