= Anna Gourari =

German musician

Anna Semyonovna Gourari (Russian Анна Семёновна Гурарий, born in Kazan, Tatarstan, Russia) is a German classical concert pianist.

== Life and career ==
Gourari received her first piano education at the age of five from her parents, professors at the Kazan Academy of Music. In 1979 she performed her first public concert. In 1990 she relocated together with her parents to Germany in order to study at the Hochschule für Musik with Ludwig Hoffmann in Munich.

In 2001 she played a lead role in Werner Herzog's movie Invincible. Gourari performed extensively in solo or with orchestras under conductors such as Lorin Maazel or Zubin Mehta.

== Competitions ==
Anna Gourari won the first prizes in the following competitions:

- 1986 Kabalevsky competition in Russia
- 1989 First International Chopin competition in Göttingen
- 1994 First International Clara-Schumann-Klavierconcours in Düsseldorf; jury: Martha Argerich, Alexis Weissenberg, Nelson Freire, Vladimir Ashkenazy

== Discography ==
- Chopin (Piano Sonata No.3, Mazurkas) - 1998
- Scriabin (Preludes) - 1999
- Richard Strauss (Piano Concertos for the Left Hand) with Bamberg Symphony Orchestra, Karl Anton Rickenbacher - 2001
- Chopin (Scherzi, etc.) - 2001
- Beethoven (Piano Concerto No.3, Piano Sonata No. 8 in C-minor, 32 Variations) with Staatskapelle Dresden, Sir Colin Davis - 2001
- Nocturnes - 2003
- Desir (Scriabin, Gubaidulina) - 2005
- Brahms: The Late Piano Pieces (opp. 116–119) - 2009
- Chopin: The Mazurka Diary - 2010
- Canto Oscuro - 2012, ECM New Series 2255
- Visions fugitives - 2014, ECM New Series 2384
- Elusive Affinity - 2019, ECM 2612
- Hindemith/Schnittke (Concertos) - 2024 ECM
