= Odyssey (Robert Fitzgerald translation) =

1961 verse translation from Greek

The Odyssey
- Author: Homer
- Translator: Robert Fitzgerald
- Language: English
- Publication date: 1961

The Odyssey is a verse translation of Homer's Odyssey by the American poet Robert Fitzgerald, published by Doubleday in 1961. Fitzgerald worked on it for seven years, most of them in Italy, supported by a Guggenheim Fellowship and a publisher's contract. He copied out the Greek text by hand book by book as he went, and aimed at an English that was colloquial and "fully alive" while avoiding the Latinisms of earlier translators such as Pope and Chapman.

The translation was awarded the Bollingen Prize for translation in 1961 and has been reprinted several times. Reviewers praised its rhythm and diction as closer to poetry than the prose versions. Fitzgerald went on to translate the Iliad and Virgil's Aeneid.

== Author and the translation ==
Robert Fitzgerald was a Harvard-educated poet and translator of Ancient Greek. While at Harvard, he acted in Milman Parry's staging of Sophocles. His friend, the poet Dudley Fitts, encouraged Fitzgerald to learn Greek. His first translation from Ancient Greek was of Euripides's Alcestis, done jointly with Fitts by mail. Edith Hamilton called it "the best translation of a Greek play she had ever read".

As early as 1948, in his review of a prose translation of the Odyssey, Fitzgerald argued that poetry "should give us a more recognizable Homer than the prose men can supply" and translated the first lines of the poem.

Fitzgerald recalled that he read Richmond Lattimore's 1951 translation of the Iliad and admired it. He wrote a letter to Lattimore, asking whether he had thought about translating the Odyssey; at the time, Lattimore had no plans to. Fitzgerald then decided to do it himself. He received a Guggenheim Fellowship and, after a talk with Jason Epstein, a contract from Doubleday. The contract gave him "three thousand dollars a year for five years". Fitzgerald moved to Italy with his family, where they lived frugally, "no car, no refrigerator, no radio, no telephone—everything was very simple".

Fitzgerald lived in Italy from 1953; the translation took seven years. He considered living in Italy, on "Homer's sea", to be very important for his work on the translation. He traveled to Ithaca to get a sense of place and, as he recalled later, he found Homer's wine-dark sea there.

One line from his translation — "The sun rose on the flawless brimming sea" — came to him, as he remembered "as he looked at the Mediterranean from the north shore of Crete in October, 1954". Fitzgerald said of it "There it was—it was flawless and it was brimming and these words exactly translated the Greek that I'd been puzzling over."

I wanted [...] to make it a transaction between Homer, 700 b.c., and Fitzgerald, 19-whatever. Between that language at that time and our language at this time.

I said in the afterword to the Odyssey that translating the Greek of Homer into English is no more possible than translating rhododendron into dogwood.

— Robert Fitzgerald

Among Fitzgerald's translation principles were the avoidance of Latinisms (in contrast to Pope and Chapman) as he wanted to show the "Greekness of the thing", and usage of "fully alive" English (by this he meant using only colloquialisms "worthy to be immortal", and not some passing slang). Fitzgerald later described his working routine in an interview:

I had this whole routine worked out while doing the Homer. I wrote out every line of Greek in my own hand, book by book, a big notebook for each book. One line to two blank lines. As I went through the Greek and copied it out in my own hand, I would face the difficulties—any crux that turned up, questions of interpretation—and try to work them out. I accumulated editions with notes and so on as I went along. So before I was through, I had acquired some of the scholarship that was relevant to my problems. But always, in the end, it was simply the Greek facing me, in my own hand, in my own notebook.

Fitzgerald tried "to keep both diction and meter constantly alive, using formulas as well as innovations sparingly", and he thought that "A living rhythm corresponds to a living voice rather than to the metronomic beat which can be soporific." Fitzgerald consulted dictionaries "to analyse every resonance" of the original text.

Fitzgerald's opening lines as printed in his 1948 article and in the published 1961 translation
1948	1961
Sing in me, Muse, and through me tell the story:	Sing in me, Muse, and through me tell the story
Of that inventive man, so hard to down,	of that man skilled in all ways of contending,
And of his wanderings, when he had ruined	the wanderer, harried for years on end,
The holy town of Troy.	after he plundered the stronghold on the proud height of Troy.
He saw the cities	He saw the townlands
And learned the ways of many mortal men,	and learned the minds of many distant men,
And many painful things, likewise, endured	and weathered many bitter nights and days
At sea and in his heart — while he fought only	in his deep heart at sea, while he fought only
To save his life, to bring his shipmates home;	to save his life, to bring his shipmates home.
But could not save those friends, try as he might,	But not by will nor valor could he save them,
For their own recklessness destroyed them all —	for their own recklessness destroyed them all—
They were such fools, they made a feast upon	children and fools, they killed and feasted on
The beeves of the holy Sun,	the cattle of Lord Hêlios, the Sun,
Who bereft then of the dawn of their return.	and he who moves all day through heaven took from their eyes the dawn of their return.

Fitzgerald taught Homer, Virgil, and Dante at Harvard for many years since the 1960s, requiring students who took his course to be fluent in at least two of the three languages of the poems. As the poet Dana Gioia recalled, Fitzgerald had his students memorize all characters of the poems, including minor ones: he thought that great poets introduced only significant characters into their works.

Lattimore's translation of the Odyssey appeared in 1965.

== Reception ==
Fitzgerald's translation was published in 1961. In the same year, he was awarded the Bollingen Prize for translation. He later translated the Iliad (1974), and Virgil's Aeneid (1983). His translation of the Odyssey was republished several times. It received generally positive reviews.

Chapman made Homer cryptic, Machiavellian, and fantastical. Pope made him elegant and epigrammatic; Morris, romantically Nordic. Mr Fitzgerald makes him tough, stark, colloquial and rather like Stephen Vincent Benét.

— C. S. Lewis

British author C. S. Lewis found that some of "Mr Fitzgerald’s renderings seem to me, by English usage, unpardonable" and criticized several word choices, but found the translation to be of good quality: "On the whole this version has much to commend it. As a substitute for Homer, tolerable – and what substitute was ever more than that? As a book to send the old back to Homer and goad the young on to Homer, it is very well worth while."

Another review compared the Fitzgerald translation with the Ennis Rees one, and found that it had "an elegance not found in Rees's simpler rendition". Fitzgerald was already a well-known poet, and the reviewer wrote that "Every word of his Odyssey seems dwelt upon, chosen only after careful study. The vocabulary is not, for all that, noticeably "poetic"."

Horace Gregory praised the translation in his review for The New York Times, writing: "In reading Fitzgerald's Homer one never forgets that Homer was a poet, a poet of serious purpose and austere imagery".

James Thompson criticized Fitzgerald's translation of sports-related Greek words in Book 8, writing that he introduced modern terms into Ancient Greece setting (e.g. Fitzgerald used "field and track" and "pentathlon" which didn't exist then, and several similar modern terms).

Reuben Brower wrote that "Fitzgerald has succeeded magnificently in this difficult task and has given us a translation that far surpasses the prose versions in faithfulness to the dramatic and poetic life of the Odyssey" and that "Fitzgerald exercises a nice balance between freedom and accuracy, apparently feeling with Pope that English taste will not stand Homeric frequency of repetition."

Israel Shenker called Fitzgerald's translations of the Odyssey and the Iliad "The struggle which consumed the substance of 20 years and gave literature a new, lithe and muscular Homer".

Classicist D. S. Carne-Ross wrote:

Thanks to Robert Fitzgerald, we will not need another Odyssey for a long time to come.

Fitzgerald's Iliad got less attention than his Odyssey. Carne-Ross was less enthusiastic about it, writing that it was not of the same caliber as Pope's translation, though the translation received positive reviews as well.

The Fitzgerald translation was republished in 2026, and coincides with Fagles translation republishing, when Christopher Nolan's The Odyssey renewed interest in the poem. Fitzgerald's translation is described by the publisher as combining "deep scholarship with the instincts of a practicing poet". A guide to the Odyssey translations described Fitzgerald's version as having "some of the most ravishing language of all the Odyssey translations", and said that "Fitzgerald prioritizes the beauty of his own words, and he doesn’t care too much about being faithful to the ancient Greek." Another guide called it "measured and musical" and that "It prioritises rhythm, tone and elegance over strict accuracy, which makes it a particular pleasure to read, especially out loud."
