= Feg Murray =

American hurdler

Personal information
- Full name: Frederic Seymour Murray
- Born: May 15, 1894 San Francisco, California, U.S.
- Died: July 16, 1973 (aged 79) Carmel, California, U.S.
- Height: 5 ft 11 in (1.80 m)
- Weight: 146 lb (66 kg)
Medal record
Men's athletics
Representing the United States
Olympic Games
Bronze medal – third place	1920 Antwerp	110 m hurdles

Frederic Seymour Murray (May 15, 1894 – July 16, 1973), known as Fred Murray or Feg Murray, was an American athlete who competed mainly in the 110 meter hurdles. He won a bronze medal in the 1920 Summer Olympics.

After his athletic career ended, Murray became a well-known artist, writer, and cartoonist. He drew a daily comic strip called "Seein' Stars" from 1933 until 1941. A Sunday-only version continued until 1951.

Murray was also the host of the radio show The Baker's Broadcast in its final year in 1938.

== Biography ==
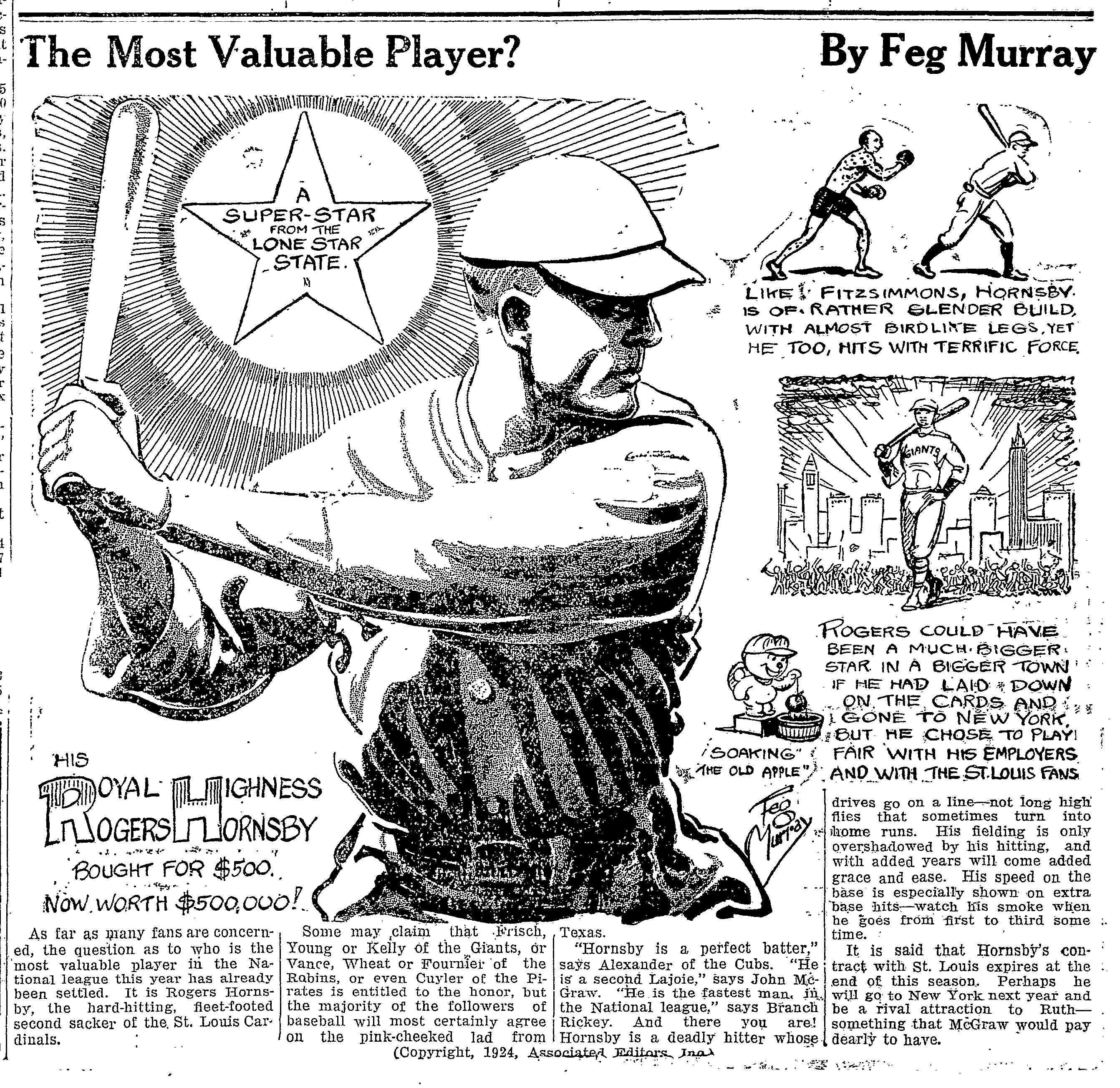
Murray cartoon about Rogers Hornsby

Murray was born in San Francisco, California in 1894, the second of five children born to classical scholar and Quaker Augustus Taber Murray. His older brother was chemist and tennis champion Robert Lindley Murray.

Feg Murray competed for the United States in the 1920 Summer Olympics held in Antwerp, Belgium in the 110 meter hurdles where he won the bronze medal. He had been captain of the track team at Stanford University in 1916. He was the 1915 U.S. National Champion in the 120 yard high hurdles and the 1915 and 1916 National Champion in the 220 yard low hurdles.

In 1917, during World War I, Murray went to France as part of the Friends' Ambulance Unit of the Red Cross. In April 1918, he enlisted in the American Expeditionary Forces, where he served in the trenches.

After the war, Murray returned to Stanford, where he became head coach of the track team for a year. After studying at the Art Students League of New York, Murray began drawing sports-related cartoons for The Sun and United Media, which syndicated his work. He returned to California in 1934, and worked for the Los Angeles Times as a sports columnist and cartoonist. He also drew the daily cartoon "Seein' Stars", syndicated by King Features Syndicate, in which Murray drew Hollywood celebrities accompanied by brief anecdotes.

Murray died in Carmel, California at the age of 79.

== Personal life ==
Murray got his A.B. in graphics arts from Stanford University in 1916. He married Dorothy Hanna in 1920.
