= My Son, My Son, What Have Ye Done =

- Theatrical release poster
- Directed by: Werner Herzog
- Written by: Herbert Golder; Werner Herzog
- Produced by: Eric Bassett
- Starring: Michael Shannon; Willem Dafoe; Chloë Sevigny; Udo Kier; Michael Peña; Grace Zabriskie; Brad Dourif
- Cinematography: Peter Zeitlinger
- Edited by: Joe Bini; Omar Daher
- Music by: Ernst Reijseger
- Production companies: Industrial Entertainment; Defilm; Paper Street Films
- Distributed by: IFC Films (United States); Kinowelt Filmverleih (Germany)
- Release dates: September 5, 2009 (Venice); December 11, 2009 (United States)
- Running time: 91 minutes
- Countries: United States; Germany
- Language: English

My Son, My Son, What Have Ye Done is a 2009 crime drama film directed by Werner Herzog, and written by Herzog and Herbert Golder. The film stars Michael Shannon as Brad McCullam, a mentally unstable man who kills his own mother (played by Grace Zabriskie) after becoming obsessed with a play he is starring in. The film follows a hostage situation resulting from the murder, while also showing the events of McCullam's life leading up to the murder in flashback, with Willem Dafoe appearing as the lead detective, and Chloë Sevigny as McCullam's fiancée.

The film is loosely based on the story of Mark Yavorsky, an actor at the University of San Diego who reenacted a scene from Orestes by murdering his mother with an antique saber. However, Herzog has stated that "about 70 percent of the script is false", with Herzog and Golder desiring to deviate from the true events, and instead focus on the main character's mental state. The film was conceived and written in 1995, but Herzog and Golder were unable to find anyone to produce it. David Lynch eventually became interested, and produced the film through his production company Absurda.

The film premiered at the 2009 Venice Film Festival on September 5, 2009, where it was nominated for the Golden Lion, along with another film directed by Herzog, Bad Lieutenant: Port of Call New Orleans. This marked the first time that two films in one year by the same director were nominated for the award.

== Plot ==
The film begins with Detective Havenhurst driving with his partner Detective Vargas. They receive a call and drive to the scene of a murder. As they push their way through the crowd at the crime scene, they see Brad McCullam leaving with a coffee cup. Inside the house, the detectives find the body of Mrs. McCullam, Brad's mother, who has just been stabbed with an antique sword. At the scene are the neighbors and chief witnesses, Mrs. and Miss Roberts. The detectives soon realize that they had just seen the murderer leaving the scene.

The Roberts' tell the detectives that Brad was disturbed, and had changed when he went to Peru recently. In a flashback we see Brad in Peru preparing for a kayak trip on a raging river. Back to the present time, the police have learned that Brad has taken two hostages in the house across the street. The police surround the house, and Brad's fiancée Ingrid arrives. Ingrid talks to Havenhurst about Brad's trip to Peru, saying that Brad's friends all drowned on their kayak trip, which Brad had decided at the last minute not to take part in; he later claimed that the voice of God had told him to stay behind. Several more flashbacks follow of Brad and Ingrid in Brad's bedroom, talking with Mrs. McCullam, looking at nearby houses, having dinner. Back in the present, Brad demands pizza for himself and the hostages, along with a car for transportation to Mexico.

In another flashback, we see Brad in rehearsals for a Greek tragedy directed by Lee Meyers. As the pizza is delivered to Brad, Lee arrives at the scene of the crime. Lee talks with Havenhurst about Brad, and we flash back to Lee and Brad visiting Uncle Ted's ostrich farm. Brad convinces Uncle Ted to give him the antique sword which would be used in the crime. Brad uses the sword in more rehearsals for the play, in which he plays the part of a man who kills his mother, who is played by his fiancée Ingrid. Brad becomes disruptive and is eventually kicked out of the production, but still travels to Calgary with Lee and his mother to attend a performance. We see some footage of Brad at Machu Picchu, and then at a Central Asian market.

A SWAT team arrives to take command of the hostage situation, and the detective talks further with Ingrid and Lee. We see a flashback to Brad and Ingrid's trip to Tijuana, after which they go to Bob Wilson Naval Hospital to "visit the sick in general". Brad buys several pillows at the hospital gift shop. Then Brad and Ingrid walk in Balboa Park, and Brad gives away his bag of pillows, keeping one, and leaves his basketball in a tree.

Back at the crime scene, Havenhurst interviews Miss Roberts, who had witnessed the crime. In a flashback to the scene just before the murder, we see the Robertses sitting down with Brad and his mother for coffee. When Brad steps out, his mother tells Mrs. Roberts that Brad has just tried to smother her with a pillow. Brad gets his coffee cup, and then goes to his car and returns with a baseball bat and the sword. He hands the bat to Miss Roberts, saying "Kill me, kill me before it happens". She does nothing, and he draws the sword and holds it in front of his mother. Miss Roberts tells detective Havenhurst that Brad stabbed her, though we do not see the crime on camera.

Ingrid and Lee talk to Brad, urging him to release the hostages and surrender. Ingrid realizes that Brad's hostages are his two pet flamingoes, and the SWAT team moves in and arrests Brad. As Brad is led into the car, we see shots of running ostriches. The final shot is in Balboa Park, where a young boy resembling Brad picks up the basketball.

== Cast ==
- Michael Shannon as Brad McCullam
- Willem Dafoe as Detective Hank Havenhurst
- Chloë Sevigny as Ingrid
- Udo Kier as Lee Meyers
- Grace Zabriskie as Mrs. McCullam
- Loretta Devine as Miss Roberts
- Irma P. Hall as Mrs. Roberts
- Michael Peña as Detective Vargas
- Brad Dourif as Uncle Ted
- Dave Bautista as Police Officer
- James C. Burns as S.W.A.T. Commander Brown
- Noel Arthur as Naval Guard

== Production ==
=== Development ===
The film was conceived long before it was eventually produced. The script began as a project of classics scholar Herbert Golder. Golder was inspired from a young age by Jules Dassin's A Dream of Passion, about an actress playing Medea and a woman who enacts Medea's crimes in her real life. Golder heard about Yavorsky's case and began a relationship with him that would last several years, conducting a series of taped interviews which would be used to write a screenplay. In 1995, Herzog joined Golder in the last of these meetings. Herzog described Yavorsky, then living in Riverside County, as "argumentative". Yavorsky, living in a trailer, had erected a shrine to Herzog's film Aguirre, the Wrath of God. This concerned Herzog so much that they did not meet again. Herzog, however, was impressed with Golder's project, and told Golder that he wanted to work on the film. The two returned to Herzog's home immediately to finish the screenplay. Herzog said, "You're not leaving until it's finished, and you're not staying longer than a week."

Golder and Herzog decided immediately that their film would deviate significantly from Yavorsky's true story. Herzog decided that they "should not connect much to the real man", and that they would focus on Yavorsky's mental state rather than the clinical facts of his case. Several lines of the script were taken verbatim from records of Yavorsky's case, but Herzog has stated that "About 70 percent of the script is false ... loosely made up." Notably, Yavorsky's name was changed, and the entire hostage situation was invented (Yavorsky surrendered immediately and took no hostages). Herzog said, "I wanted to do something intelligent where an audience would know three minutes into the film, would know what had happened. An elderly woman had been killed with a sword. Secondly, you would know who the murderer was. And finally you would know where he was. From then on, you do not know what is going to happen one moment after another."

The film's development stagnated for many years after its writing, when Herzog and Golder were unable to find anyone willing to produce it. The production eventually began in the late 2000s at a meeting with Herzog and filmmaker David Lynch. Herzog and Lynch both expressed a desire for, in Herzog's words, "a return to essential filmmaking" with small budgets, good stories, and the best actors available. Lynch immediately asked "Do you have a project?" and Herzog told him about My Son, which began pre-production immediately.

=== Filming ===
The main location for the shoot was a real home in Point Loma, San Diego, near Yavorsky's home. Actors Shannon and Zabriskie appreciated filming so close to the story's actual setting, while producer Eric Bassett said that the choice of location was for financial reasons, and Herzog says that it was simply "a matter of convenience". Their location was very close to San Diego International Airport, which made shooting difficult at times. Crew members were stationed on the roof with binoculars to alert the crew about flights, which would disrupt the sound recording, as Herzog insisted on using only production sound for the film.

Other scenes were shot on the Urubamba River in Peru, a favorite location of Herzog's which appeared in his earlier films Aguirre, the Wrath of God and Fitzcarraldo. Herzog originally set the scenes at the Braldu River in the western Himalayas, where the real life Yavorsky had had a life-changing trip, but for safety reasons did not wish to film in Northern Pakistan.

One sequence was shot in a market in Kashgar, Xinjiang Uygur Autonomous Region, China. Not wishing to endure the lengthy process to obtain shooting permits in China, Herzog went to Kashgar with Shannon and producer Bassett on tourist visas to shoot the scene "guerrilla film style". They brought a small digital video camera which they used to film Shannon wandering around in a crowded outdoor market, in a scene with no narrative ties to the rest of the story.

The film was shot on the popular RED ONE digital camera. Herzog related his frustration with slowness of the camera in interview with DGA Quarterly, saying "It's an immature camera created by computer people who do not have a sensibility or understanding for the value of high-precision mechanics, which has a 200-year history."

== Release ==
The film premiered at the 2009 Venice Film Festival on September 5, 2009. After a very limited festival and theatrical release, a DVD was released on September 14, 2010.

== Reception ==
Reviews for My Son, My Son, What Have Ye Done have been mixed. As of June 2025, the film holds a 50% approval rating on Rotten Tomatoes, based on 42 reviews with an average rating of 5.76/10. The website's critics consensus reads: "Enigmatic and digressive, this mystical potboiler possesses director Werner Herzog's penchant for offbeat atmosphere, but lacks the absurdist humor and profundity that makes his previous trips into madness compelling." On Metacritic, the film has a weighted average score of 59 out of 100, based on 13 critics, indicating "mixed or average reviews".

Jeff Shannon of the Seattle Times called the film "One of Herzog's quirky misfires," while Roger Ebert of the Chicago Sun-Times said the film "Confounds all convention and denies all expected pleasures, providing instead the delight of watching Herzog feed the police hostage formula into the Mixmaster of his imagination. It’s as if he began with the outline of a stunningly routine police procedural and said to hell with it, I’m going to hang my whimsy on this clothesline."

== See also ==
- List of media set in San Diego
