= Arion (journal) =

Arion: A Journal of Humanities and the Classics
- Winter 2022 cover
- Language: English
- Edited by: Herbert Golder

Publication details
- History: 1962–present
- Publisher: Boston University (United States)

Standard abbreviations
- ISO 4: Arion

Indexing
- ISSN: 0095-5809
- LCCN: 64028291
- JSTOR: 00955809
- OCLC no.: 22689958

Links
- Journal homepage; Online access; Online archive

Arion: A Journal of Humanities and the Classics is a literary journal of ancient Greek, Roman, and Mediterranean studies and classical tradition. It is published triennially by Boston University. Arion seeks to publish poetry, translation, critical and literary essays, creative writing, book reviews, and visual art that captures the interest of readers both inside and outside of professional academia.

The Director and Editor-in-Chief of Arion, Herbert Golder, is Professor of Classics at Boston University and noted filmmaker. In 1992, he was awarded the Council of Editors of Learned Journals Phoenix Award for Significant Editorial Achievement for revitalizing the journal.

The editorial board at Arion is composed of prominent poets, scholars, and intellectuals such as Robert Alter, Paul Barolsky, Anne Carson, Raymond Guess, Glenn W. Most, Martha Nussbaum, Camille Paglia, and Oliver Taplin. Brandon Jones is managing editor.

The non-profit journal is supported by Boston University College of Arts and Sciences, individual donors, and institutional and individual subscribers. It is electronically hosted by Project Muse; earlier issues are archived on JSTOR. Print subscriptions are available directly from the journal.

== History ==
Arion was founded under the auspices of classicist and translator William Arrowsmith at the University of Texas at Austin in 1962. Additional founding editors included D. S. Carne-Ross, J.P. Sullivan, and Frederic Will. It ran for nine volumes as a quarterly at UT until 1972 and was again revived by Arrowsmith in 1973 at Boston University, where it ran for three more volumes as a quarterly (New Series 1–3) before being discontinued.

Arion was revived in 1990 under Herbert Golder, and as of 2024 has published 32 volumes as a triquarterly (Third Series 1-32). In 2004, the journal was awarded the American Philological Association's inaugural Outreach Award for bringing classics to readers outside the academy. Then president of the APA, Elaine Fantham, stated that "Arion is the one journal I would most want to show friends outside of the Classics to demonstrate our exuberant variety of form and content, and its continued vitality."
