= Theodore Alois Buckley =

English classicist and translator (1825–1856)

Theodore Alois William Buckley (1825–1856) was a translator of Homer and other classical works. His parents were William Richard Buckley and Olivia Buckley. His mother was the daughter of two composers and began performing music in public at the age of eight. She was a music teacher and church organist in Paddington, London. In a family with ten children, Buckley was raised in poverty. He taught himself from an early age by reading in the British Museum and became a prodigy in classical languages. He attended Oxford as a servitor, receiving an education and housing in return for acting as a servant to other students. He matriculated from Christ Church, Oxford in 1845 (BA 1849, MA 1853).

Early on he was supported financially by George Burges and Thomas Grenville. Later, his income came from writing short fiction and histories, and from editing and translation. He used opium and drank. He knew Charles Dickens, who in his letters referred disparagingly to his fiction. He lived in Paddington and had a large library that he had acquired cheaply at bookstalls.

In 1851, his literal prose translation of Homer's Odyssey, with explanatory notes, was published in Bohn's Classical Library series.

In 1852, Buckley published the book "The great cities of the ancient world in their glory and their desolation". This book depicts stories, descriptions and legends surrounding the great ancient cities. The book has had many revisions and new editions, two of which were in the first year of publishing, one of which included illustrations. The third edition was published in 1855 and new editions followed in 1858, 1864, 1878, and 1896.

In 1873, he published a literal prose translation of the complete text of the Iliad, in which he included explanatory notes.

Buckley died young of infectious disease.

== Sources ==
- Alumni Oxoniensis: The Members of The University of Oxford, 1715 - 1886: Their Parentage
