= Invincible (2001 theatrical film) =

2001 film by Werner Herzog

- DVD cover
- Directed by: Werner Herzog
- Written by: Werner Herzog
- Produced by: Werner Herzog; Gary Bart
- Starring: Tim Roth; Jouko Ahola; Anna Gourari; Max Raabe; Udo Kier
- Cinematography: Peter Zeitlinger
- Edited by: Joe Bini
- Music by: Klaus Badelt; Hans Zimmer
- Production company: Werner Herzog Filmproduktion; TATfilm; Little Bird Company; FilmFour Productions; Jan Bart Production; ARD
- Distributed by: FilmFour Distributors (UK); Zephir Film (Germany); Fine Line Features (US)
- Release date: 29 March 2001 (UK)
- Running time: 133 minutes
- Country: Germany; United Kingdom; Ireland; United States; Lithuania
- Language: English

Invincible (German: Unbesiegbar) is a 2001 biographical historical drama film written, produced and directed by Werner Herzog. It is a fictionalized account of the lives of Zishe Breitbart, a Jewish strongman in early 20th-century Berlin, and Erik Jan Hanussen, a self-proclaimed mystic and clairvoyant. It stars real-life strongman Jouko Ahola as Breitbart and Tim Roth as Hanussen.

== Plot ==
Zishe Breitbart is the son of an Orthodox Jewish blacksmith in rural Poland. He is fantastically strong, largely from working at hard labour all day. A talent agent sees how strong Breitbart is in his Jewish shtetl home and convinces him to move to Berlin, where he can find work as a strongman.

Erik Jan Hanussen, an epic con-man and supposed mystic, runs a cabaret variety show. Hanussen gives Breitbart a blonde wig and a Nordic helmet and calls him "Siegfried" so as to identify him with the Aryan notion of physical superiority. This appeals to the largely Nazi clientele, and he is a big hit. Included is interaction between Breitbart, attractive stage musician Marta, their boss Hanussen, who abuses her, and some very top level Nazis. Ultimately Breitbart becomes disgusted and dismayed.

A visit from Breitbart's young brother, Benjamin, convinces Breitbart to be proud of his Jewish heritage, and so, without warning, he takes off the blonde wig in the middle of his act to announce that he is not an "Aryan", and calls himself a new Jewish Samson. This makes him a hero to the local Jews, who flock to the cabaret to see their new Samson. The Nazis are not as pleased, and Hanussen tries to discredit Breitbart. He tries to make it seem that it was his mystic powers that were the true strength behind the strongman, and makes it look as though even his frail female pianist Marta can break chains and lift weights if under his power.

Hanussen knows the Nazis dabble in the occult and hopes to become a part of Hitler's future government. He therefore hobnobs with the likes of Himmler and Goebbels. In the end, however, he is exposed as a Czech Jewish con artist named Herschel Steinschneider. As a result, Hanussen is kidnapped and murdered by the Brownshirts. Breitbart foresees what will be known as the Holocaust and returns to Poland to warn the Jewish people of its coming. Unfortunately, no one believes him and he accidentally dies from an infected wound, according to the final titles, two days before Hitler takes power in 1933. In the final scene he is in a delirium as a result of the infection. In a dreamscape surrounded by Christmas Island red crabs, he has a vision of his younger brother Benjamin flying safely away from the looming Holocaust.

== Cast ==
- Jouko Ahola as Zishe Breitbart
- Tim Roth as Erik Jan Hanussen
- Anna Gourari as Marta Farra
- Max Raabe as Master of Ceremonies
- Jacob Wein as Benjamin Breitbart
- Gustav-Peter Wöhler as Alfred Landwehr
- Udo Kier as Count Helldorf
- Herbert Golder as Rabbi Edelmann
- Gary Bart as Yitzak Breibart
- Renate Krößner as Mrs. Breitbart
- Ben-Tzion Hershberg as Gershon
- Rebecca Wein as Rebecca
- Raphael Wein as Raphael
- Daniel Wein as Daniel
- Chana Wein as Chana
- Klaus Stiglmeier as Circus Ringkeeper
- Tina Bordihn as Hedda Christianesen
- Silvia Vas as Mrs. Holle
- Alexander Duda as Heinrich Himmler
- Klaus Händl as Joseph Goebbels
- Hark Bohm as Judge
- André Hennicke as Detective
- Werner Herzog as Curtain Puller

== Production ==
While basing his story on the real-life figure Zishe Breitbart, Herzog uses the bare facts of Breitbart's life to weave fact and fiction. For example, the story is set in 1932 Berlin, seven years after Breitbart's death in 1925. The historical Marta Farra was not a pianist, but a fellow strength performer nicknamed "Hercules Girl".

The real Zishe Breibart's grandson, Gary Bart, was a producer on the film and plays a supporting role. Yitzchok Adlerstein was a rabbinical consultant on the film.

Shooting took place on-location in Kuldīga, Latvia and Vilnius as well as Museum of Lithuanian people's lifestyle, Rumšiškės in Lithuania, in Germany, and in the United Kingdom. The final sequence was shot on Christmas Island.

=== Music ===
The film features an original score composed by German composer Hans Zimmer, co-written with fellow composer Klaus Badelt. Along with films like The Pledge (also co-written with Zimmer) this marks one of the first projects of Badelt in the feature film industry, and one of several collaborations with Herzog as well.

== Box office ==
Invincible opened in North America on 20 September 2002 in 4 theatres, grossing US$14,293 ($3,573 per screen) in its opening weekend, ranking 85th for the weekend. At its widest point, it played in only 9 theatres, and its total gross is US$81,954. It was only in theatrical release for 35 days.

== Critical reception ==
Invincible received mixed reviews during its North American theatrical run. On one end of the spectrum, Roger Ebert said it was one of the best movies of the year:

Watching Invincible was a singular experience for me, because it reminded me of the fundamental power that the cinema had for us when we were children. The film exercises the power that fable has for the believing. Herzog has gotten outside the constraints and conventions of ordinary narrative, and addresses us where our credulity keeps its secrets.

On the syndicated television show Ebert & Roeper, Ebert's co-host Richard Roeper was also enthusiastic, calling the film, "A tremendous piece of work."

David Stratton described it as an uninteresting and overly-long take on a fascinating period of 20th century history. However he did appreciate the production values, which were "solid", and the film had a "predictably rich" music soundtrack.

On the review aggregator website Rotten Tomatoes, 55% of 51 critics' reviews are positive, with an average rating of 5.9/10. The website's consensus reads: "Sluggish and flawed, this is a minor work in Herzog's career." Metacritic, which uses a weighted average, assigned the film a score of 55 out of 100, based on 19 critics, indicating "mixed or average" reviews.
