= Brian Kemball-Cook =

English classicist

Brian Hartley Kemball-Cook (12 December 1912 – 19 September 2002) was a classicist and headmaster at a direct grant grammar school in Blackburn and Bedford Modern School. Among other works, Kemball-Cook published his translation of Homer's Odyssey into English in the original hexameter (1993).

He was the son of Basil Kemball-Cook and his wife Nancy Pavitt. He was educated at Shrewsbury School and Balliol College, Oxford.

== See also ==
- English translations of Homer: Brian Kemball-Cook
