= The Baker's Broadcast =

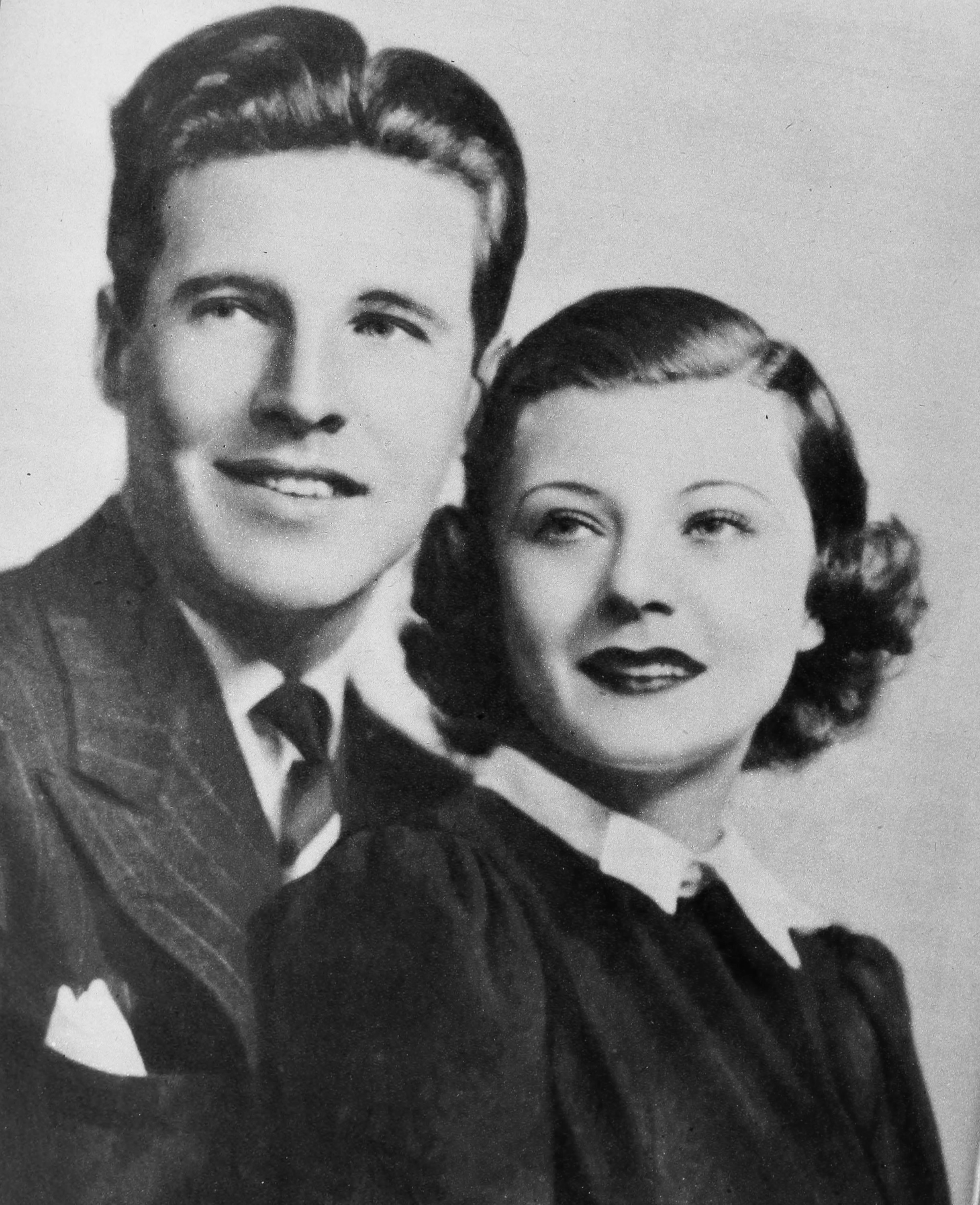
- Ozzie and Harriet Nelson were heard on all three versions of The Baker's broadcast. (Image from Radio Mirror magazine October 1936)
- Other names: The Joe Penner Show (1933–1935 only); Believe It or Not (1935–1937 only)
- Genre: Variety
- Running time: 30 minutes
- Country of origin: United States
- Language: English
- Syndicates: NBC-Blue
- Starring: Ozzie Nelson and Harriet Nelson (1933–1938); Joe Penner (1933–1935); Robert Ripley (1935–1937); Feg Murray (1937–1938)
- Announcer: Ben Grauer (1933–1938)
- Written by: Hal Raynor (1933–1934); Ed Rice (1937–1938)
- Produced by: Robert Brewster (1937–1938); John Christ (1937–1938)
- Original release: October 8, 1933 – June 26, 1938
- Sponsored by: Fleischmann's Yeast

The Baker's Broadcast is the name applied to three old-time radio variety programs in the United States. The first one went on the air October 8, 1933; the third one's last broadcast was June 26, 1938. The name applied to all three apparently was derived from Fleischmann's Yeast, which sponsored all three programs.

== Format ==
=== 1933–1935 ===
Run dates: October 8, 1933 – June 30, 1935

Joe Penner starred in this version, along with Ozzie Nelson and Ozzie's future wife, Harriet Hilliard. Penner's role led to the program's having an alternate unofficial title, The Joe Penner Show. Hal Erickson, in his book, From Radio to the Big Screen: Hollywood Films Featuring Broadcast Personalities and Programs, wrote, "Though bearing the name The Baker's Broadcast when it debuted over NBC-Blue on October 8, 1933, it was The Joe Penner Show all the way so far as the public was concerned."

Ozzie Nelson led the orchestra for the program, and Harriet was the singer. The Penner-Nelsons combination ended when Penner "abruptly exited The Baker's Broadcast, upset over the sponsor's refusal to freshen up the writing and alter the format." Kliph Nesteroff, in his book, The Comedians: Drunks, Thieves, Scoundrels, and the History of American Comedy, wrote about Penner's version of the show, "The style of his program was juvenile but undeniably popular ...."

Among the contributions this program made was bringing to a national audience Mel Blanc, the virtuoso of voices who later had his own program and was featured on other old-time radio programs.

Ben Grauer was the announcer, and Hal Raynor was a writer for the program.

=== 1935–1937 ===
Run dates: October 6, 1935 – June 27, 1937

The Nelsons, who were married two days after this version began, continued as co-stars, with Penner replaced by Robert Ripley. Ripley's role led to the use of the alternate unofficial title Believe It or Not (which was used for other radio programs that featured Ripley). Neal Thompson, in his book, A Curious Man: The Strange & Brilliant Life of Robert "Believe it Or Not" Ripley, called the Ripley version of The Baker's Broadcast "one of America's favorite shows, in league with the top-ranked shows of Jack Benny and Bing Crosby."

John Dunning in his reference work, On the Air: The Encyclopedia of Old-Time Radio, wrote that the Nelsons "were young and attractive, and their music — lighthearted and melodious — was what America wanted in the Depression.

Ben Grauer continued as the program's announcer.

=== 1937–1938 ===
Run Dates: October 3, 1937 – June 26, 1938.

For its final series, The Baker's Broadcast not only changed hosts but moved from New York City to Hollywood. Former athlete and comics artist Feg Murray became the new host, while the Nelsons continued to provide music. Dunning wrote: "Feg Murray hosted and Ozzie helped with interviews. This never generated much excitement: it failed after a single season."

Once again, Grauer was the announcer. Robert Brewster was the producer (succeeded by John Christ) and Ed Rice wrote scripts for the program.
