= D. S. Carne-Ross =

Classicist and critic of literary translation (1921–2010)

- Born: Donald Carne-Ross; 1921; Havana, Cuba
- Died: January 9, 2010 (aged 88–89)
- Education: University of Oxford
- Occupations: Classicist, editor, critic

Donald Selwyn Carne-Ross (1921 – 9 January 2010), better known just as D. S. Carne-Ross, was a classicist, editor and critic of literary translation. He is chiefly remembered as a polemicist for translation as a creative and critical act rather than a scholarly discipline. He co-founded the journal Arion, and was the producer who commissioned Christopher Logue's Homeric "accounts", War Music.

== Early life and the BBC ==
Carne-Ross was born in Havana, Cuba and grew up in England. He graduated from University of Oxford with the equivalent of a master's degree. He served during World War II, and then joined BBC Radio's Third Programme as a producer.

In 1959 he commissioned poet Christopher Logue, who knew no Greek, to make a version of the Iliad episode in which Achilles fights the river Scamander (Iliad 21). Its success on the Third Programme launched a project Logue extended over five decades; Logue worked from existing English translations and from a word-for-word crib Carne-Ross prepared for him. The project became known as War Music; Logue prefer to call it an adaptation and not a translation.

== United States ==
Carne-Ross moved to the United States in 1959, studying at Cornell University, and received a Guggenheim Fellowship in 1962 for work on Italian literature. He taught at the University of Texas at Austin, where he co-founded Arion with William Arrowsmith — a journal that approached the classics as literature rather than as history — and, in 1965, the National Translation Center and its companion journal Delos. Both journals printed works by Logue and translations by Peter Porter, Robert Fagles and Peter Whigham, and essays on translation by Carne-Ross, Arrowsmith and H. A. Mason.

When John Silber left Austin for the presidency of Boston University in 1971, Carne-Ross was among the professors he recruited. At Boston University he helped establish the University Professors Program, taught until 2001, and held the William Goodwin Aurelio chair in Greek language and literature.

== Criticism and ideas ==
Carne-Ross argued that the "spirit" of translation is more important than scholarly translations close to originals. He was highly critical to versions praised for fidelity, Richmond Lattimore's above all:

Modern versions that the professors call faithful (the translator can read Latin but not write English). True translation, that is, changes and enlarges the English language; and at the same time modifies our relation to the original.

Instead of an exact translation, he praised inventiveness. Writing to Logue to congratulate him on his version of Iliad 16, Patrocleia, he wrote:

You bring in something from Ezra, a shot from an Eisenstein film, a bit of Chinese etc, yet it all seems like Homer.

In "Structural Translation" (Arion, 1962) he made Logue's Patrocleia his exemplar and held up Alexander Pope's Iliad as "the most serious translation in the language". In Horace in English he explained his ideas: a poet must be "re-embodied in the speech of each new day". He also sponsored working poet-translators, notably David Ferry's Horace.

== Selected works ==
- Instaurations: Essays in and Out of Literature, Pindar to Pound (Berkeley: University of California Press, 1979)
- Pindar (New Haven: Yale University Press, 1985)
- Horace in English, ed. with Kenneth Haynes (London: Penguin, 1996)
- Classics and Translation: Essays by D. S. Carne-Ross, ed. Kenneth Haynes (Lewisburg, PA: Bucknell University Press, 2010)
