= Augustus Taber Murray =

American classical philologist (1866–1940)

Augustus Taber Murray (Rutgers)

Augustus Taber Murray (1866–1940) was an American classical philologist and translator and a Quaker minister. He was Professor of Greek at Stanford University for forty years.

== Life ==
Augustus Taber Murray was born in Manhattan on October 29, 1866. He graduated A.B. from Haverford College in 1885 and Ph.D. from Johns Hopkins University (with a dissertation on Aristophanes) in 1890, before undertaking further studies at Leipzig and Berlin.

He was Professor of Greek successively at Earlham College, from 1888 to 1890; Colorado College, from 1891 to 1892; and Stanford University, from 1892 to 1932. For the nascent Loeb Classical Library he translated the Odyssey (2 vols., 1919), the Iliad (2 vols., 1924), and the Private Orations of Demosthenes (4 vols., 1936–1939).

Murray was a prominent Quaker, and in 1929 and 1930, having obtained leave from Stanford, he resided in Washington as pastor to President Hoover, his personal friend.

Murray died at Palo Alto, California on March 8, 1940. An able athlete and tennis enthusiast, Murray was the father of U.S. tennis champion Robert Lindley Murray and Olympic athlete turned cartoonist Frederick ("Feg") Murray.
