= Joseph Carne-Ross =

19th-century physician

- Born: 1846; Madeira, Portugal
- Died: 1911 (aged 64–65)
- Spouse: Kate Selwyn
- Children: 4, including Stewart Buckle

Joseph Carne-Ross FRCPE (1846-1911) was a Portuguese-born physician and science-fiction author. He studied medicine at the University of Edinburgh, being awarded an MD in 1882 for his thesis entitled 'Observations upon the modes of treatment of pleurisy with effusion: with special reference to the therapeutic value of thoracentesis'. He published a series of letters presenting the results of experiments using cinnamon to treat cancer, scarlet fever, measles and influenza in The Lancet medical journal in 1894.

He was the author of the science-fiction novel Quintura: Its Singular People and Remarkable Customs, which presents a description of an island governed on classless but Eugenic lines by physicians, who also serve as the culture's police force, applying scientific advances in medicine to predict accurately when and where individuals are about to commit crimes.

He married Kate Selwyn. They had three sons and one daughter, including Stewart Buckle Carne Ross, the Postmaster-General of Hong Kong.

== Publications ==
- Quintura: Its Singular People and Remarkable Customs (London: John and Robert Maxwell, 1886)
