= Robert Fagles =

American professor, poet and academic (1933–2008)

- Born: September 11, 1933; Philadelphia, Pennsylvania, U.S.
- Died: March 26, 2008 (aged 74); Princeton, New Jersey, U.S.
- Spouse: Marilyn Duchovnay (m. 1956)
- Children: 2
- Awards: National Humanities Medal

Academic background
- Education: Amherst College (BA); Yale University (MA, PhD)
- Thesis: The Conquest of the Mind: A Study of the Augustan Odyssey (1959)

Academic work
- Discipline: English
- Sub-discipline: Comparative literature
- Institutions: Princeton University
- Notable works: Odyssey Translation

Robert Fagles (/ˈfeɪɡəlz/; September 11, 1933 – March 26, 2008) was an American translator, poet, and academic. He was best known for his many translations of ancient Greek and Roman classics, especially his acclaimed translations of the epic poems of Homer and Virgil. He taught English and comparative literature for many years at Princeton University.

== Early life & education ==
Fagles was born on September 11, 1933, in Philadelphia, Pennsylvania, to Charles Fagles, a lawyer, and Vera Voynow Fagles, an architect. He attended Lower Merion High School in the Philadelphia suburbs, where he took German language classes. He attended Amherst College as a pre-med major but switched to English after reading translations of Greek classics. He was elected to Phi Beta Kappa and graduated summa cum laude in 1955 with a Bachelor of Arts degree.

After graduating he attended Yale University, where he studied the English translators of the classics under Maynard Mack. While here he read Greek with Bernard Knox who wrote the introductions to several of Fagles’ translations and included Fagles’ translations in his portion of The Norton Anthology of World Masterpieces (1979), and The Norton Book of Classical Literature (1993). After receiving his master's degree from Yale University he married Marilyn (Lynne) Duchovnay, a teacher, on June 17, 1956, and they adopted two children. In 1959, Fagles received his Ph.D in English from Yale and for the next year taught English there.

== Career ==
From 1960 to 1962, Fagles was an English instructor at Princeton University. In 1962 he was promoted to assistant professor, and in 1965 became an associate professor of English and comparative literature. Later that year he became director of the comparative literature program. In 1970, he became a full professor, and from 1975 was the department chair. He retired from teaching as the Arthur W. Marks '19 Professor of Comparative Literature in 2002, and remained a professor emeritus at Princeton.

Between 1961 and 1996, Fagles translated many ancient Greek works. His first translation was of the poetry of Bacchylides, publishing a complete set in 1961. In the 1970s, Fagles began translating much Greek drama, beginning with Aeschylus's The Oresteia. He went on to publish translations of Sophocles's three Theban plays (1982), Homer's Iliad (1990) and Odyssey (1996), and Virgil's Aeneid (2006). In these last four, Bernard Knox authored the introduction and notes. Fagles's translations generally emphasize contemporary English phrasing and idiom but are faithful to the original as much as possible.

In 1978, Fagles published I, Vincent: Poems from the Pictures of Van Gogh. He was the co-editor of Homer: A Collection of Critical Essays (1962) and Pope's Iliad and Odyssey (1967).

Fagles died at his home in Princeton, New Jersey, on March 26, 2008, from prostate cancer.

== Awards ==
Fagles was nominated for the National Book Award in Translation and won the Harold Morton Landon Translation Award of the Academy of American Poets in 1991 for his translation of the Iliad. In 1996, he received an Academy Award in Literature from the American Academy of Arts and Letters for his translation of the Odyssey. In 1997 he received the PEN/Ralph Manheim Medal for lifetime achievement in translation. Fagles later undertook a new English translation of the Aeneid, which was published in November 2006.

In addition to the American Academy of Arts and Letters, Fagles was also a member of the American Academy of Arts and Sciences and the American Philosophical Society.

He received a National Humanities Medal by the National Endowment for the Humanities.

On June 8, 2011, a resource center devoted to the study of the Classics was dedicated to Dr. Fagles at Princeton High School. At the dedication, students and teachers paid tribute to Dr. Fagles.

== Translations ==
- Bacchylides, Complete Poems (1961)
- Aeschylus, The Oresteia (1975)
- Sophocles, The Three Theban Plays (1982)
  - Antigone
  - Oedipus the King
  - Oedipus at Colonus
- Homer, The Iliad (1990)
- Homer, The Odyssey (1996)
- Virgil, The Aeneid (2006)

== See also ==
- English translations of Homer by Robert Fagles
