= Herbert Hailstone =

British writer

Herbert Hailstone (1850–1896) was an English author and scholar. He served as an Assistant Master at Eton College. He committed suicide in Regent's Park in 1896, by cutting his own throat.

== Early life and education ==
He grew up in Bottisham, Cambridgeshire, the son of Reverend John Hailstone. He was educated at Eton College before studying at Peterhouse, Cambridge, graduating with a BA in 1873. He was later awarded a Masters in 1879.

== Career and literary work ==
Between 1873 and 1876, he was Assistant Master at Eton College. He later worked privately as a tutor in London. He translated several classical works, wrote a poem entitled "The fortunes of Ey Abbey" (c. 1870), and edited the Clergy List between 1889 and 1891.

== Suicide ==
He committed suicide in Regent's Park in 1896, by cutting his own throat.
