= William Arrowsmith =

American classicist, academic and translator (1924–1992)

- Born: William Ayres Arrowsmith; April 13, 1924; Orange, New Jersey, US
- Died: February 21, 1992 (aged 67); Brookline, Massachusetts, US
- Education: Princeton University (undergraduate and doctorate degrees); Oxford University (bachelor's and master's degrees)
- Occupations: classicist, academic, and translator
- Employers: Chairman of the Classics Department at the University of Texas; Professor at Boston University, Princeton University, MIT, Yale, Johns Hopkins University, NYU, and Emory University
- Known for: his classical and contemporary translations
- Notable work: Translation of Petronius's Satyricon (1959); Translation of Aristophanes' plays The Birds (1961); Translation of The Clouds (1962); Translation of Euripides' Alcestis, Cyclops, Heracles, Orestes, Hecuba, and The Bacchae
- Awards: Rhodes Scholar; Wilson, Guggenheim and Rockefeller fellowships; Ten honorary degrees

William Ayres Arrowsmith (April 13, 1924 – February 21, 1992) was an American classicist, academic, and translator.

== Life ==
Born in Orange, New Jersey, the son of Walter Weed Arrowsmith and Dorothy (Ayres) Arrowsmith, William grew up in Wellesley, Massachusetts. He went to schools in Massachusetts and Florida, then The Hill School received a A.B. summa cum laude and Phi Beta Kappa and a Ph.D. from Princeton University, and also earned bachelor's and master's degrees from Oxford University. Arrowsmith was a Rhodes Scholar while at Oxford and later received Wilson, Guggenheim and Rockefeller fellowships. He was awarded ten honorary degrees.

Arrowsmith is remembered for his translations of Petronius's Satyricon (1959) and Aristophanes' plays The Birds (1961) and The Clouds (1962), as well as Euripides' Alcestis, Cyclops, Heracles, Orestes, Hecuba, and The Bacchae, and other classical and contemporary works. He was the general editor of the 33-volume The Greek Tragedy in New Translations (Oxford, 1973) and of Nietzsche's Unmodern Observations (Yale, 1989). Arrowsmith also translated modern works, including The Storm and Other Things (Norton, 1985) by Eugenio Montale, the Nobel laureate Italian poet; Hard Labor (Grossman, 1976) by Cesare Pavese, for which he won the U.S. National Book Award in category Translation (a split award); and Six Modern Italian Novellas (Pocket Books, 1964). He is known for his writings on Italian film director Michelangelo Antonioni. A prolific writer and editor, he founded and edited The Hudson Review and later Arion and served on the editorial board of Delos, Mosaic, American Poetry Review and Pequod.

An academic for most of his life, Arrowsmith served as chairman of the Classics Department at the University of Texas as well as a professor at Boston University, Princeton University, MIT, Yale, Johns Hopkins University, NYU, and Emory University. He gained notoriety with his attacks on graduate education in the humanities in the 1960s, particularly in a Phi Beta Kappa lecture on "The Shame of the Graduate Schools: A Plea for a New American Scholar" published in Harper's Magazine in 1966. He blamed "the hideous jungle of academic bureaucracy" for making the humanities irrelevant to modern life and sacrificing education to trivial research, "the cult of the fact" and career training. Later he served on a National Endowment for the Humanities panel that issued a report in 1984 voicing similar views. He was also on the board of the American Association for Higher Education and the International Council on the Future of the University.

Arrowsmith died after suffering a heart attack at his home in Brookline, Massachusetts at age 67. An extensive tribute to Arrowsmith appeared in Arion.

== Works ==
- Erich Segal, ed. (1968). "Euripides' Theater of Ideas". Euripides: a collection of critical essays. Prentice-Hall.
- Aeschylus, Euripides (1959). "Cyclops". In David Grene (ed.). The complete Greek tragedies. University of Chicago Press.
- Aristophanes (1969). William Arrowsmith (ed.). Three comedies: The birds; The clouds, The wasps. Translated by William Arrowsmith; Douglass Parker. University of Michigan Press. ISBN 978-0-472-06153-2.
- Petronius Arbiter (1959). Satyricon. Translated, with an introd. by William Arrowsmith. University Of Michigan Press.
- Eurípides (1992). William Arrowsmith; Herbert Golder (eds.). Iphigeneia at Aulis. Translators W. S. Merwin, George E. Dimock. Oxford University Press US. ISBN 978-0-19-507709-4.
