= Odyssey (Robert Fagles translation) =

1996 translation by Robert Fagles

The Odyssey
- First edition cover
- Author: Robert Fagles
- Language: English
- Publisher: Viking Press
- Publication date: 1996

The Odyssey is a 1996 translation of Homer's Odyssey by American academic Robert Fagles. It freely uses imagery and word choices not closely constrained by the original text, and uses non-rhyming lines with an uneven poetic meter. Widely praised for Fagles' poetic skill, it became part of many American high-school curricula and sold over a million copies. Fagles was a prolific translator of ancient literature, previously translating works by Bacchylides, Aeschylus and Sophocles.

== Translation ==
=== Author ===
Robert Fagles (1933–2008) was an academic and a translator. He gained his undergraduate degree at Amherst College in 1955 and his Ph.D. in English literature at Yale University. He joined Princeton University's English department in 1960. During his career, he produced English versions of the Oresteia, Sophocles' Theban plays, and Roman poet Virgil's epic poem the Aeneid. He was one of the few to translate the Iliad, Odyssey and Aeneid, forming a kind of trilogy.

=== Style ===
Fagles said that he aimed in his translation to emphasize what he called the "sympathetic" depiction of women in the Odyssey. In recent years, this has been speculated on by feminist critics, especially with regard to Fagles' treatment of Odysseus and Penelope's slave-girls.

Fagles based the translation on a version of the Greek text by David Munro and Thomas Allen, first published in 1908 by Oxford University Press. Fagles' translation has an irregular meter, typically 6 beats per line but sometimes ranging from 4 to 8.

His translation of the first line reads: "Sing to me of the man, Muse, the man of twists and turns".

== Publication ==
Viking Press published the translation in 1996. It sold for US$35 in the United States and £25 in the United Kingdom.

The Fagles translation was republished in 2026, simultaneously with Robert Fitzgerald's 1961 translation, after a renewed interest in the poem surged by Christopher Nolan's film adaptation.

== Reception ==
Robert Fagles' Iliad and Odyssey were best-sellers, with C. K. Williams describing him as the most widely read poet-translator of the 20th century. It had sold over 150,000 copies by December 1996, and eventually sold over a million copies. His Odyssey frequently featured as an assigned reading for American high-school classes, likewise introducing parents to the texts.

It was praised upon release by Garry Wills for being "politically correct" and for its sympathetic treatment of the poem's female characters, particularly elite females. Classicist Emily Wilson described Fagles' Odyssey as representing the relationship between Odysseus and Penelope as a marriage between intellectual equals, but she also criticized Fagles' comments on his work for ignoring the "huge inequality of economic and social power" in their relationship and for assuming that the "heteronormative institution of marriage is always a positive force for women." The New York Times notes that Fagles was not "exactingly literal", instead being poetic, while preserving the spirit of the original with "Homeric swagger". The translation uses exciting verbs and military imagery.

== Bibliography ==
- Feeney, Denis (2008). "Robert Fagles (1933-2008)". The Classical World. 101 (4): 541–542. ISSN 0009-8418. JSTOR 25471977.
- Wilson, Emily (2019-10-03). "Epilogue: Translating Homer as a Woman". In Cox, Fiona; Theodorakopoulos, Elena (eds.). Homer's Daughters: Women's Responses to Homer in the Twentieth Century and Beyond. Oxford University Press. pp. 279–298. ISBN 978-0-19-252353-2.
