= Prometheus Unbound (Aeschylus) =

Lost tragedy of Aeschylus

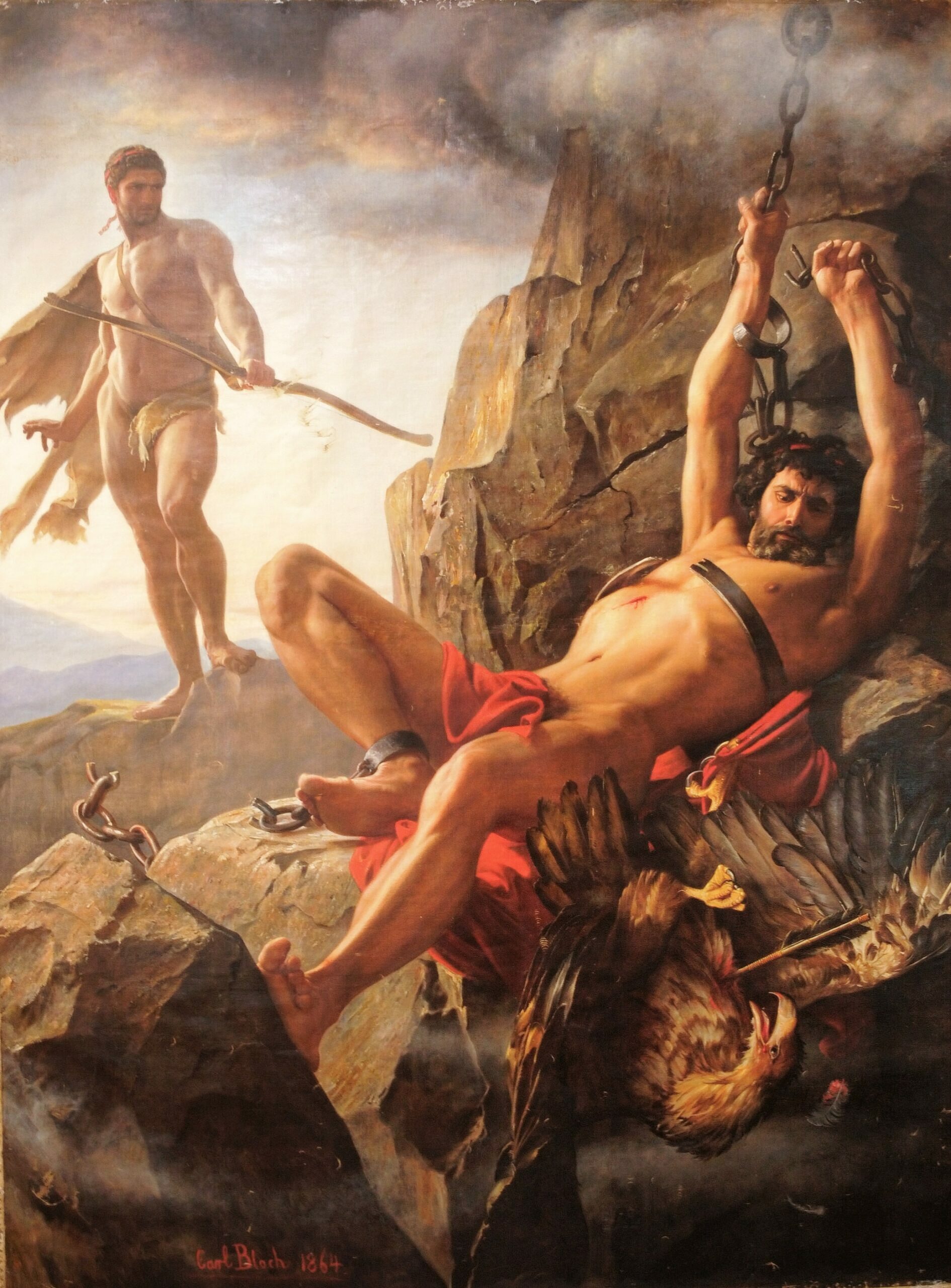
Prometheus Unbound, 1864 painting by Carl Bloch

Prometheus Unbound (Ancient Greek: Προμηθεὺς Λυόμενος, Promētheus Lyomenos) is a fragmentary play in the Prometheia trilogy attributed to the 5th-century BC Greek tragedian Aeschylus, thought to have followed Prometheus Bound. Prometheus Unbound was probably followed by Prometheus the Fire-Bringer. It is concerned with the torments of the Greek mythological figure Prometheus who defies the gods and proceeds to give fire to humanity (theft of fire), for which he is subjected to eternal punishment and suffering at the hands of Zeus.

The text of the Unbound survives only in eleven fragments preserved by later authors. Nevertheless, these fragments, combined with prophetic statements made in the first play of the trilogy, allow the reconstruction of a broad outline.

A lengthy fragment translated into Latin by the Roman statesman Cicero indicates that the play would have opened with Prometheus visited by a chorus of Titans. Though Zeus had imprisoned them in Tartarus after the Titanomachy, he had at long last granted them clemency. This perhaps foreshadows Zeus's eventual reconciliation with Prometheus in the trilogy's third installment. Prometheus complains about his torment just as he had to the chorus of Oceanids in Prometheus Bound. As the dramatis personae of Prometheus Bound erroneously lists Gaea, it has been suggested that she is next to visit Prometheus in this play, in a sympathetic role that echoes Oceanus' turn in the first play. Finally, the faulty dramatis personae mentioned above and several fragments indicate that Heracles visits the Titan just as Io had in Prometheus Bound. Heracles kills the eagle that had been torturing Prometheus by eating his regenerating liver every day and frees the Titan. Again mirroring events in the previous play, Prometheus forecasts the travels of Heracles as he concludes his Twelve Labours. The play thus concludes with Prometheus free from the torments of Zeus, but the Titan and Olympian have yet to reconcile.

It inspired the play of the same title by Percy Bysshe Shelley.

== See also ==
- Prometheus Bound
