= Prometheus Bound =

Ancient Greek tragedy by Aeschylus

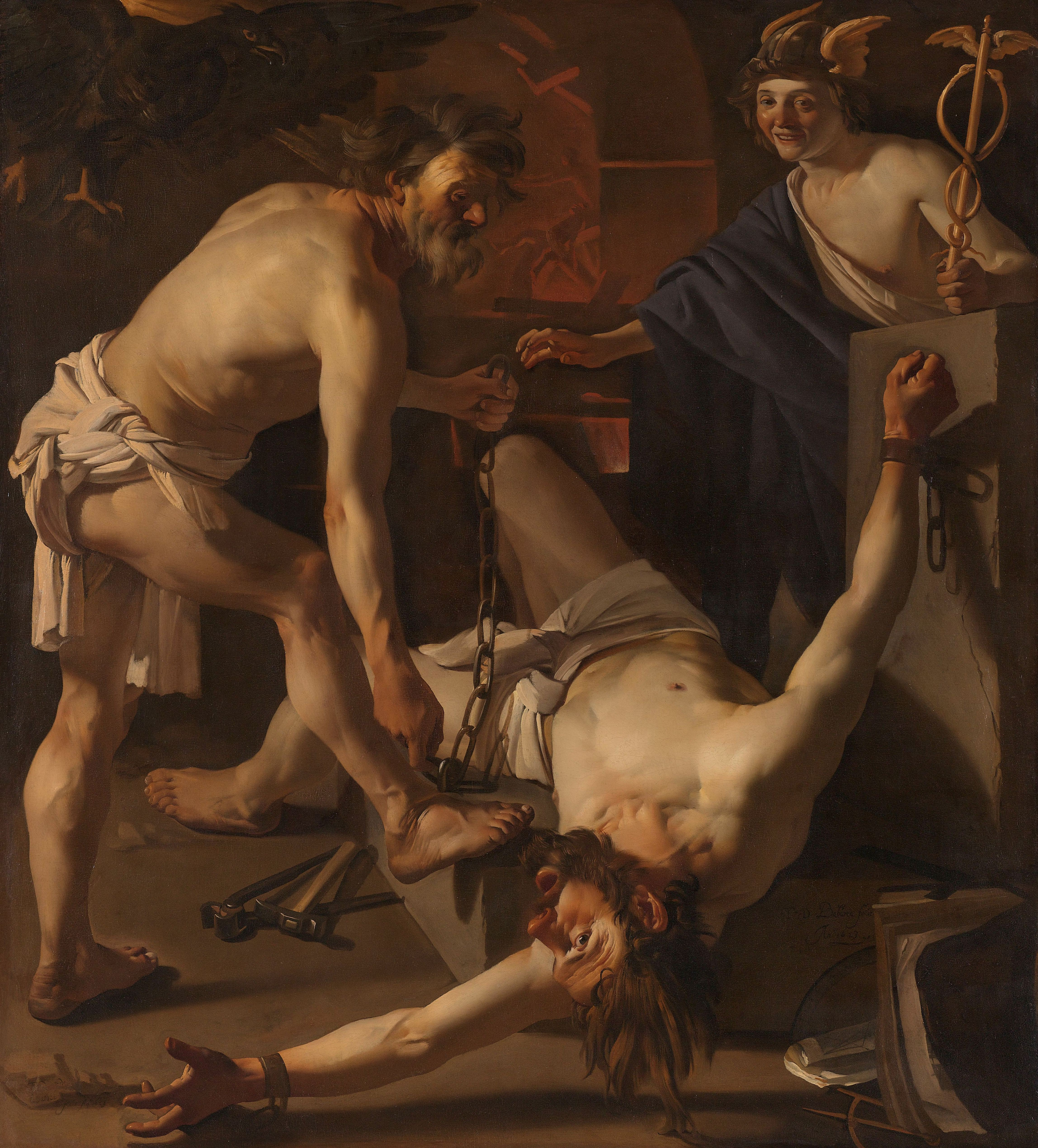
- Prometheus Being Chained by Vulcan by Dirck van Baburen
- Written by: Aeschylus (disputed)
- Chorus: Oceanids
- Characters: Cratus; Bia; Hephaestus; Prometheus; Oceanus; Io; Hermes
- Subject: Prometheus' punishment
- Setting: Scythian mountains

Premiere
- Date: 479–424 BC

Prometheus Bound (Ancient Greek: Προμηθεὺς Δεσμώτης, romanized: Promētheús Desmṓtēs; Latin: Prometheus Vinctus, often abbreviated PV) is an ancient Greek tragedy traditionally attributed to Aeschylus and thought to have been composed sometime between 479 BC and the terminus ante quem of 424 BC. The tragedy is based on the myth of Prometheus, a Titan who defies Zeus, and protects and gives fire to mankind, for which he is subjected to the wrath of Zeus and punished.

British-born author, C.J. Herington, a scholar of classical Greek and Latin, wrote that Aeschylus certainly did not mean Prometheus Bound to be a "self-contained dramatic unity", and suggests that "most modern students of the subject would probably agree" that Prometheus Bound was followed by a work with the title Prometheus Lyomenos (Prometheus Unbound). Herington adds that "some very slight evidence" indicates that Prometheus Unbound "may have been followed by a third play", Prometheus Pyrphoros (Prometheus the Fire-Bearer); the latter two survive only in fragments. Some scholars have proposed that these fragments all originated from Prometheus Unbound, and that there were only two Promethean plays rather than three. Since the final two dramas of the trilogy have been lost, the author's intention for the work as a whole is not known.

The ascription to Aeschylus had never been challenged since antiquity down to relatively recent times. (Note: 'The climate of opinion has certainly changed since my undergraduate days the fifties when only those studying Prometheus as a special option ever heard that its authenticity had been questioned, and this was presented as a curiosity of scholarship and a dreadful aberration from the plain truth.'; 'Ancient scholarship from the Hellenistic period onwards had no doubts about Prometheus Bound's Aeschylean authorship... this silence is not decisive.. Modern anxieties about the reliability of the ascription to Aeschylus stem from nineteenth-century scholarship, which, particularly in Germany, was keen to spot where plays had been modified or reworked by a later hand.. In the twentieth century, critics recognized that the oddities of the Prometheus Bound could not be localized and introduced the idea that the play was not by Aeschylus at all') By the 1970s, both R. P. Winnington-Ingram and Denys Page had become sceptical of its authenticity, but the majority of scholars still affirmed the traditional attribution of authorship. (Note: 'the majority of classical scholars still accept the Aeschylean authorship of the play (which was not questioned in antiquity).'; 'The vast majority of scholars are in no doubt that Prometheus is entirely the work of Aeschylus.') Independently in 1977 both Oliver Taplin and Mark Griffith made forceful cases, on linguistic, technical and stagecraft grounds, for questioning its authenticity, a view supported by M. L. West. To date, no consensus on the matter has been established, though recent computerized stylometric analysis has thrown the burden of proof on those who uphold the traditional claim.

== Synopsis ==
Before the play begins, Cronus, the ruler of the pre-Olympian gods (the Titans), had been overthrown by an insurgency led by Zeus. In that revolt, Prometheus had sided with Zeus. As the new king, Zeus intended to destroy and replace humankind. Prometheus, frustrated by this plan, shows humans the use of fire, which Prometheus had stolen. Prometheus also taught humanity the arts. For these acts of defiance, Zeus intends to punish Prometheus by chaining him to a rock in the mountains of Scythia.

The play opens with four characters on stage, a feature unique among the surviving corpus of Greek tragedy, in which a given scene rarely involved more than two actors besides the chorus. Kratos and Bia, personifications of brute power and callous violence respectively, are engaged in fettering the silent Prometheus to a mountainside in Scythia, and are assisted in the task by the begrudging blacksmith of the gods, Hephaestus. Zeus, an off-stage character in this play, is portrayed as a tyrannical leader.

Only one of Zeus's two agents, Kratos, speaks in this scene, and he announces his orders harshly and insolently. Kratos states that the punishment meted out to Prometheus is due to the fact he stole fire and revealed the secret of how it is produced to humanity, adding that the punitive measure taken will compel Prometheus to take cognizance of the sovereignty of Zeus. For Prometheus, his punishment occurs because he dared to rescue mankind from being annihilated by Zeus. The penalty exacted is particularly galling since he himself had been instrumental in securing Zeus's victory in the Titanomachy.

Hephaestus performs his task, shackling Prometheus to the mountain, whereupon all three exit, leaving Prometheus alone on stage. Prometheus now speaks, and appeals to the powers of Nature, which are all around him. He calls on the wind, the mountains' springs of water, the Earth and the Sun — to witness how he suffers unfairly. Somewhat elliptically he intuits what the future might portend in positive terms, and his outrage diminishes.

Prometheus becomes aware that something is approaching. He hears the beating of wings, and inhales the scent of the ocean. A chorus enters, made up of the daughters of Oceanus. From within their deep sea-caves, they had heard the sound of the hammering, and were drawn by curiosity and fear. They have arrived without stopping to put on their sandals. Before they come closer, they hover in the air just above Prometheus, who hints to them that he is keeping a secret that will eventually cause him to have power over Zeus. The chorus thinks that he is speaking out of anger, and may not actually be prophetic. Responding to their questions, Prometheus tells the story of his offense against Zeus admitting that it was deliberate. He complains that the punishment is too harsh. At last, Prometheus invites the chorus to stop hovering and come down to earth, to listen to more of what he has to say. They agree, and arrange themselves downstage in order to listen.

Prometheus' story is interrupted by the entrance of Oceanus — the father of the chorus of nymphs. Oceanus arrives in a carriage drawn by a winged beast — a griffin. Oceanus is an older god, a Titan son of Earth, who has made peace with Zeus. He has heard of Prometheus' troubles, and has come to offer some sympathy and advice. Prometheus is proud, and is hurt by this offer. Prometheus responds coldly, and wonders why Oceanus would leave his caves and streams to see such a miserable sight chained to a rock. Prometheus suggests that Oceanus should not intervene, out of concern for his own safety. Oceanus is annoyed by this, but wants to help, and offers to leave only when Prometheus tells him that if he attempts to intervene it will only increase the punishment Prometheus is suffering. Oceanus notes that his winged beast is eager to get home to his own stable, and he exits.

Prometheus is alone again with the chorus of Oceanus' daughters, who did not speak while their father was visiting. Prometheus speaks to the chorus of Ocean nymphs. He asks pardon for his silence, which is because he was thinking about the ingratitude of the gods. He describes the positive things he had done for humans. In the so-called Catalogue of the Arts (447–506), he reveals that he taught men all the civilizing arts, such as writing, medicine, mathematics, astronomy, metallurgy, architecture, and agriculture. He suggests that he will one day be unchained, but it will be due to the intervention of Necessity, which is something directed by Fate, not Zeus. When asked how that will happen, he keeps it secret. The Chorus sings an Ode that is a prayer that they will never cross Zeus.

Io, the daughter of Inachus, king of Argos, arrives. Io had become the object of Zeus's affections and desires, which angered Zeus's wife, Hera. Io's father was advised to banish his daughter from his house, which he does. Io then wanders the Earth. Hera turned Io into a heifer and the herder Argus drove her from land to land. After Argus was killed by Hermes, a new torment was inflicted on Io — a plague of gad-flies. She has now arrived at the desolate place where Prometheus is chained. Prometheus is familiar with her story, and she recognizes him as the great friend to humans. The chorus doesn't know Io's past, and persuades Prometheus to let Io tell them. The chorus is shocked and saddened and asks Prometheus to tell of Io's future wanderings. He hesitates because he knows it will be painful.

A brief dialogue reveals that Prometheus and Io are both victims of Zeus and that in the future Prometheus will eventually be freed by the descendants of Io. Prometheus asks Io to choose: Does she want to hear the rest of her own future, or the name of her descendant that will rescue him? The chorus interrupts — they want both: One answer for Io and one for themselves. Prometheus foresees that Io's wanderings will end at the mouth of the Nile. There Zeus will restore her. She will give birth to a son, Epaphus, who will father fifty daughters, all of whom will murder their husbands, except for one, who will bear a line of kings, and another one who will rescue Prometheus from his torment. Prometheus' future rescuer is not named, but is known to be Heracles. Io bounds away.

Prometheus proclaims that no matter how great Zeus may be, his reign will eventually come to an end. Zeus may do his worst, but it will not be forever. The chorus express caution, which he responds to with even more defiance. Prometheus's words have reached Zeus, whose messenger, Hermes, appears to urge Prometheus to reveal his secret about the marriage that threatens Zeus. Hermes reveals Zeus' own threats — the earthquake, the fall of the mountain that will bury Prometheus, the eagle that will attack Prometheus's vital organs. Prometheus states again that he knows all that is to come and will endure it. Prometheus warns the chorus to stand aside. They don't. The end comes: Earthquake, dust-storm, jagged lightning, whirlwind. As Zeus blasts Prometheus to Tartarus down in the bowels of the earth, Prometheus has the last line of the play: "O holy mother mine, O you firmament that revolves the common light of all, you see the wrongs I suffer!" Prometheus vanishes along with the chorus...

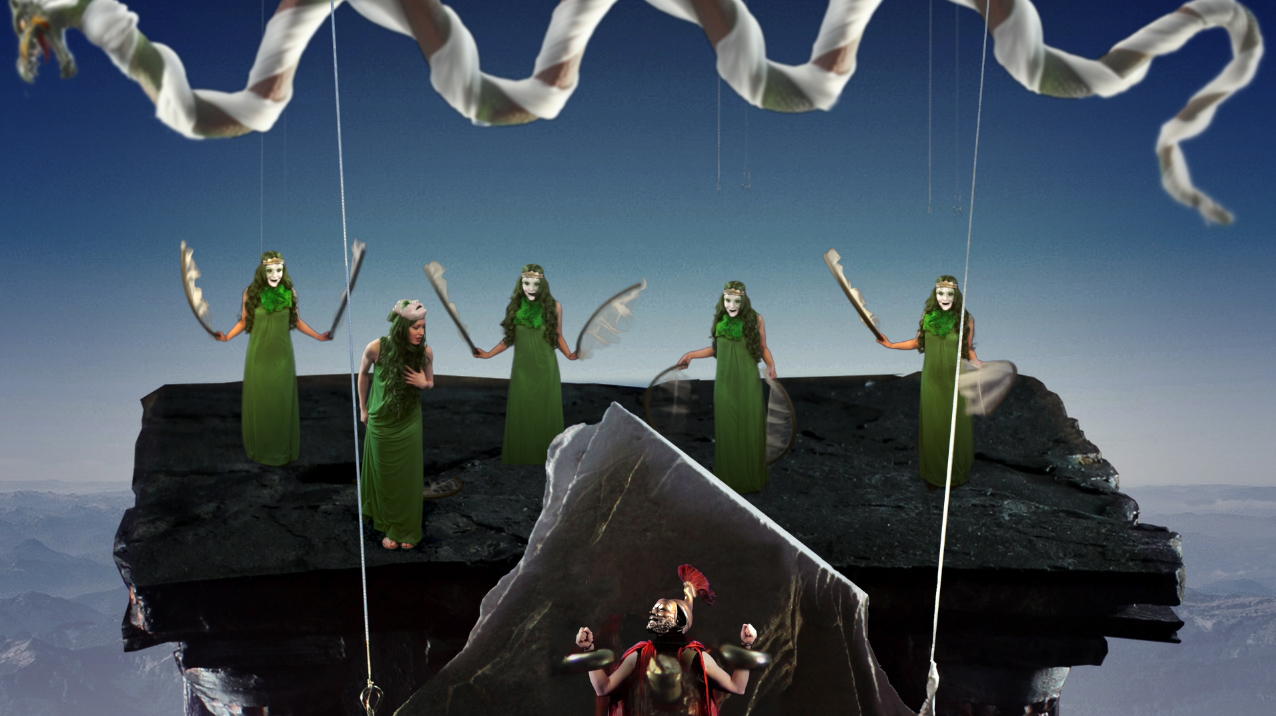
Prometheus Bound: staging by MacMillan Films in 2015

== Textual styles ==
The play is composed of dialogues between the different characters, including, Io, Ocean, Nature, and with the chorus. The dialogue contains a sustained stichomythia between Prometheus and Oceanus, and also a unique series of quatrains sung by the chorus.

== Departures from Hesiod ==
Hesiod's Works and Days and Theogony, written circa 700 BC, are early and major sources for stories of Greek mythology, and sources for Aeschylus. Hesiod's Theogony contains the starting point for Aeschylus' play, which was written more than two centuries later. However, by the time that Aeschylus read the Theogony, it had accrued significant additions that are now part of the extant version. Parts of those additions — including the story of Hercules killing the eagle — are essential to Aeschylus' conception of Prometheus Bound. Aeschylus also added his own variations. For example, in Hesiod Prometheus' efforts to outwit Zeus are simply presented, without noting that Zeus' response is overly cruel, or that Prometheus' actions might be justified — that Zeus became angry was enough for Hesiod to report without question. Aeschylus looks at those events in Hesiod, and sees intolerable injustice.

Another departure by Aeschylus from Hesiod's Theogony involves the two forms of punishment of Prometheus — the chaining to a rock, and the eagle's daily tearing of his liver. In the version of the Theogony that Aeschylus was familiar with, which is also the extant version known to modern readers, the two punishments are presented as one story. It was Aeschylus, who instead decided to separate the tortures, and have the eagle begin tearing at Prometheus' liver only after the chained Prometheus had refused to reveal the secrets that Zeus wanted to know. Aeschylus' alterations have been maintained by literature that followed Prometheus Bound.

Hesiod portrays Prometheus as a lowly trickster and semi-comic foil to Zeus's authority. Zeus's anger toward Prometheus is in turn responsible for mortal man's having to provide for himself; before, all of man's needs had been provided by the gods. Prometheus' theft of fire also prompts the arrival of the first woman, Pandora, and her jar of evils. Pandora is entirely absent from Prometheus Bound, where Prometheus becomes a human benefactor and divine kingmaker, rather than an object of blame for human suffering.

== Prometheus Trilogy ==
There is evidence that Prometheus Bound was the first play in a trilogy conventionally called the Prometheia, but the other two plays, Prometheus Unbound and Prometheus the Fire-Bringer, survive only in fragments. In Prometheus Unbound, Heracles frees Prometheus from his chains and kills the eagle that had been sent daily to eat the Titan's perpetually regenerating liver. Perhaps foreshadowing his eventual reconciliation with Prometheus, we learn that Zeus has released the other Titans whom he imprisoned at the conclusion of the Titanomachy. In Prometheus the Fire-Bringer, the Titan finally warns Zeus not to lie with the sea nymph Thetis, for she is fated to give birth to a son greater than the father. Not wishing to be overthrown, Zeus would later marry Thetis off to the mortal Peleus; the product of that union will be Achilles, Greek hero of the Trojan War. Grateful for the warning, Zeus finally reconciles with Prometheus.

== Questions regarding authorship ==
Scholars of the Great Library of Alexandria considered Aeschylus to be the author of Prometheus Bound. Since the 19th century, however, doubts began to emerge, after Rudolf Westphal, in 1857 and again in 1869, challenged the idea that the text was the work of a single author. In 1911, A. Gercke became the first scholar to reject the Aeschylean ascription, while dismissing the notion that a Prometheus trilogy itself existed. Two years later his student F. Niedzballa likewise concluded the text was written by someone else, on the basis of lexical analysis of words in the play not recurrent elsewhere in Aeschylus. Some have raised doubts focused on matters of linguistics, meter, vocabulary, and style, notably by Mark Griffith, though he remained open to idea that uncertainty persists and the traditional attribution might turn out to be correct. (Note: 'I should stress that the discovery tomorrow of a scrap of papyrus, confirming Aeschylus as author, would in no way astonish me. We know too little to be certain about anything (Griffith 1977, p. xi)) (Note: 'With limited evidence available to us for comparison (less than one-tenth of Aeschylus' oeuvre) we cannot hope for certainty one way or the other.' (Griffith 2007, p. 34)) Griffith's views were challenged in brief by Günther Zuntz and in great detail by Maria Pia Pattoni in 1987. M. L. West found the evidence against the ascription 'overwhelming' and, after editing all seven plays, wrote an extended analysis and review of Griffith, Zuntz and Pattoni's work concluding that ascription to Aeschylus was untenable and contextualizing the play as the product of the 440s-430s era.

Some scholars note that certain themes in the play appear to be foreign to Aeschylus, when compared to the themes in his other plays. The scholar Wilhelm Schmid argues that the playwright who demonstrated such piety toward Zeus in The Suppliants and Agamemnon could not have been the same playwright who in Prometheus Bound inveighs against Zeus for violent tyranny. M. L. West argued that Prometheus Bound may be the work of Aeschylus' son, Euphorion, who was also a playwright.

Responses to some of these questions have included the suggestion that the strongest characteristic of the play is in the humanity of their portrayal. The mythological and religious aspects are treated as secondary compared to the clash of wills that occurs between Zeus and Prometheus. The rebellion of Prometheus was not invented by Aeschylus, who only breathed the human spirit into older forms. This play, Prometheus Bound, only contains a part of the story. In the sequel, Aeschylus would have had the chance to give to Zeus' character an arc, and show him learning and developing more admirable and generous aspects. Coming later in the trilogy, a benevolent Zeus would have a deeper impact. In this play Zeus does not appear — we learn of the tyranny of Zeus, only from those who suffer from it. Characters' views need not be identical with the author's.

== Dating the play ==
A reference (lines 363–372) to the eruption of Mount Aetna in 479 suggests that Prometheus Bound may date from later than this event. The play cannot date later than 430 BC, because Prometheus Unbound (part of the same trilogy as Prometheus Bound) was parodied in Cratinus' Ploutoi (429 BC). Prometheus Bound was then parodied in Cratinus' Seriphioi (c. 423) and Aristophanes' Acharnians (425 BC).

== Reception and influence ==
Prometheus Bound enjoyed a measure of popularity in antiquity. Aeschylus was very popular in Athens decades after his death, as Aristophanes' The Frogs (405 BC) makes clear. Allusions to the play are evident in his The Birds of 414 BC, and in the tragedian Euripides' fragmentary Andromeda, dated to 412 BC. If Aeschylean authorship is assumed, then these allusions several decades after the play's first performance speak to the enduring popularity of Prometheus Bound. Moreover, a performance of the play itself (rather than a depiction of the generic myth) appears on fragments of a Greek vase dated c. 370–360 BC.).

In the early 19th century, the Romantic writers came to identify with the defiant Prometheus. Johann Wolfgang von Goethe wrote a poem on the theme, as did Lord Byron. Percy Bysshe Shelley wrote a play, Prometheus Unbound, which used some of the materials of the play as a vehicle for Shelley's own vision.

== Performance in the English language ==
In 1979 George Eugeniou directed and performed in the play at Theatro Technis London setting the drama in the Greece governed by the Junta. George Eugeniou, Koraltan Ahmet and Angelique Rockas played roles.

In 2005, Prometheus Bound once again reached a London stage at The Sound Theatre in James Kerr's new translation, also directed by Kerr and starring David Oyelowo as Prometheus.

A translation of the play by Joel Agee, commissioned by the J. Paul Getty Museum, the CalArts Center for New Performance, and Trans Arts, was first performed from 29 August to 28 September 2013 at the Getty Villa's Outdoor Classical Theater. It was directed by Travis Preston, composed by Ellen Reid and Vinny Golia, and choreographed by Mira Kingsley. The production employed a huge, steel wheel in place of the barren cliff.

In April 2015 MacMillan Films, in the United States, staged Prometheus Bound for camera using Peter Arnott's translation with James Thomas directing, Tanya Rodina as Io, and Casey McIntyre as the Chorus Leader. The production used a real skene building whose roof was the landing and dance platform for the Chorus of Oceanids.

== Translations ==
- Robert Potter, 1777 - verse: (full text available at Wikisource)
- Thomas Medwin, 1832 — verse: full text 1837 (Pagan Press reprint 2011)
- Elizabeth Barrett Browning, writing anonymously, 1833 — verse: (full text available at Wikisource)
- Henry David Thoreau, 1843 — verse: (full text available at Wikisource)
- Henry William Herbert, 1849 — verse: Google ebook
- Theodore Alois Buckley, 1849 — prose: full text
- Elizabeth Barrett Browning, 1851 — verse: (full text available at Wikisource; completely different translation from her 1833 version)
- Charles Cavendish Clifford, 1852 — verse: Google ebook
- Augusta Webster, 1866 — verse: (full text available at Wikisource)
- C. B. Cayley, 1867 — verse: full text
- Edward Hayes Plumptre, 1868 — verse: full text
- Anna Swanwick, 1886 – verse (full text available at Wikisource)
- John Dunning Cooper, 1890
- 4th Earl of Carnarvon, 1892
- Herbert Hailstone, 1892
- Edward Henry Pember, 1895 — verse: full text
- George Denman, 1896 — verse
- Paul Elmer More, 1899 — prose and verse: full text
- Edwyn Bevan, 1902 — verse (full text available at Wikisource)
- J. Case, 1905 – verse
- John Stuart Blackie, 1906 — verse: full text
- Robert Whitelaw, 1907 — verse: full text
- E. D. A. Morshead, 1908 — verse: (full text available at Wikisource)
- Walter George Headlam and C. E. S. Headlam, 1909 – prose full text
- Marion Clyde Wier, 1916 — verse: full text
- G. M. Cookson, 1924 — verse: (full text available at Wikisource)
- Herbert Weir Smyth, 1926 — prose: (full text available at Wikisource)
- Clarence W. Mendell, 1926 — verse
- Robert C. Trevelyan, 1939 — verse
- David Grene, 1942 — prose and verse
- E. A. Havelock, 1950 — prose and verse
- F. L. Lucas, 1954 — verse
- Philip Vellacott, 1961 — verse
- Paul Roche, 1964 — verse
- Robert Lowell, 1967 — prose
- C. John Herrington and James Scully, 1975 — verse
- James Kerr, 2005
- G. Theodoridis, 2006 — prose: full text
- Alan Sommerstein, 2008 — prose
- Ian C. Johnston, 2012 — verse
- Deborah H. Roberts, 2012 — verse
- Joel Agee, 2013 — verse
- James Romm, 2016 — verse

== See also ==
- Prometheus Unbound and Prometheus the Fire-Bringer, which are believed to be the sequels
- Prometheus Unbound, a four-act lyrical drama by Percy Bysshe Shelley, inspired by the Greek tragedy
- Prométhée, the opera by Gabriel Fauré, partly based on the first half of Prometheus Bound
- Prometheus, the music drama by Carl Orff, a complete setting of Prometheus Bound

== Bibliography ==
- Aeschylus (2005). Prometheus Bound. Translated by Kerr, James. London: Oberon Books. ISBN 978-1840026351.
- Barrios-Lech, Peter (10 April 2021). "Review of Manousakis". Bryn Mawr Classical Review.
- Behrens, Deborah (5 September 2013). "Preston's Prometheus Bound Brings Poetic Revolution to Getty Villa". @THIS STAGE magazine.
- Boehm, Mike (31 August 2013). "Getty Villa's 5-ton wheel keeps 'Prometheus Bound' centered". Los Angeles Times.
- Conacher, D. J. (1980). Aeschylus' Prometheus Bound: A Literary Commentary. University of Toronto Press. ISBN 978-0-802-02391-9.
- DeVries, K. (1993). "The Prometheis in Vase Painting and on Stage". In Rosen, Ralph Mark; Farrell, Joseph (eds.). Nomodeiktes: Greek Studies in Honor of Martin Ostwald. University of Michigan Press. pp. 517–523. ISBN 978-0-472-10297-6.
- Flintoff, E (1986). "The Date of the Prometheus Bound". Mnemosyne. 39 (1/2): 82–91. doi:10.1163/156852586X00040. JSTOR 4431467.
- Griffith, Mark (1977). The Authenticity of Prometheus Bound. Cambridge University Press. ISBN 978-0-521-03814-0.
- Griffith, Mark, ed. (2007) [First published 1983]. Prometheus Bound. Cambridge University Press. ISBN 978-0-521-27011-3.
- Herington, C. J. (1973–1974). "Introduction to Prometheus Bound". Arion: A Journal of Humanities and the Classics. 1 (4): 640–667. JSTOR 20163350.
- Herington, C. J. (2015) [First published 1970]. The Author of the Prometheus Bound. University of Texas Press. ISBN 978-1-477-30420-4.
- Hubbard, T.K (1991). "Recitative Anapests and the Authenticity of Prometheus Bound". American Journal of Philology. 112 (4): 439–460. doi:10.2307/294928. hdl:2152/31162. JSTOR 294928.
- Inverne, James (5 August 2005). "David Oyelowo to Star in London Prometheus Bound". Playbill.
- Ireland, S. (1977). "Sentence Structure in Aeschylus and the Position of the Prometheus in the Corpus Aeschyleum". Philologus. 121: 189–210. doi:10.1524/phil.1977.121.1.189. S2CID 201807537.
- Lamberton, Robert (1988) [First published 1959]. Hesiod. Yale University Press. ISBN 978-0-300-04069-2.
- Manousakis, Nikos (2020). 'Prometheus bound'- a separate authorial trace in the Aeschylean corpus. Trends in classics. Vol. 96. Walter de Gruyter GmbH & Co KG. ISBN 978-3-110-68764-4.
- Neschke-Hentschke, Ada (1983). "Geschichten und Geschichte: Zum Beispiel Prometheus bei Hesiod und Aischylos". Hermes. 111 (4): 385–402. JSTOR 4476333.
- Pattoni, Maria Pia (1987). L'autenticità del Prometeo incatenato di Eschilo. Scuola Normale Superiore di Pisa. ISBN 978-8-876-42011-5.
- Podlecki, A.J (2006). "Echoes of the Prometheia in Euripides' Andromeda?". Annual Meeting of the American Philological Association. Montreal.
- "Prometheus Bound". The atricalia.
- Prometheus Bound, "Son of thine, but son, the thirteenth generation shall beget."
- Ruffell, Ian (2012). Aeschylus: Prometheus Bound. A & C Black. ISBN 978-0-715-63476-9.
- Schmid, Wilhelm (1929). Untersuchungen zum Gefesselten Prometheus. Tübinger Beiträge zur Altertumswissenschaft. Vol. 9. Stuttgart: Kohlhammer.
- Solmsen, Friedrich (1995). Hesiod and Aeschylus. Cornell University Press. ISBN 978-0-801-48274-8.
- Sommerstein, Alan (1996). Aeschylean Tragedy. Bari.
- Taplin, Oliver (1989) [First published 1977]. The Stagecraft of Aeschylus. Clarendon Press. ISBN 978-0-198-14486-1.
- West, Martin L. (1979). "The Prometheus Trilogy". The Journal of Hellenic Studies. 99: 130–148. doi:10.2307/630637. JSTOR 630637. S2CID 161700684.
- West, Martin L. (2015) [First published 1990]. "The authorship of the Prometheus trilogy". Studies in Aeschylus. Vol. 1. Walter de Gruyter GmbH & Co KG. pp. 51–74. ISBN 978-3-110-94806-6.
- Zuntz, Günther (1983). "Αἰσχύλου Προμηθεύς". Hermes. 111 (4): 498–499. JSTOR 4476342.
