= Demogorgon =

Demon associated with the underworld

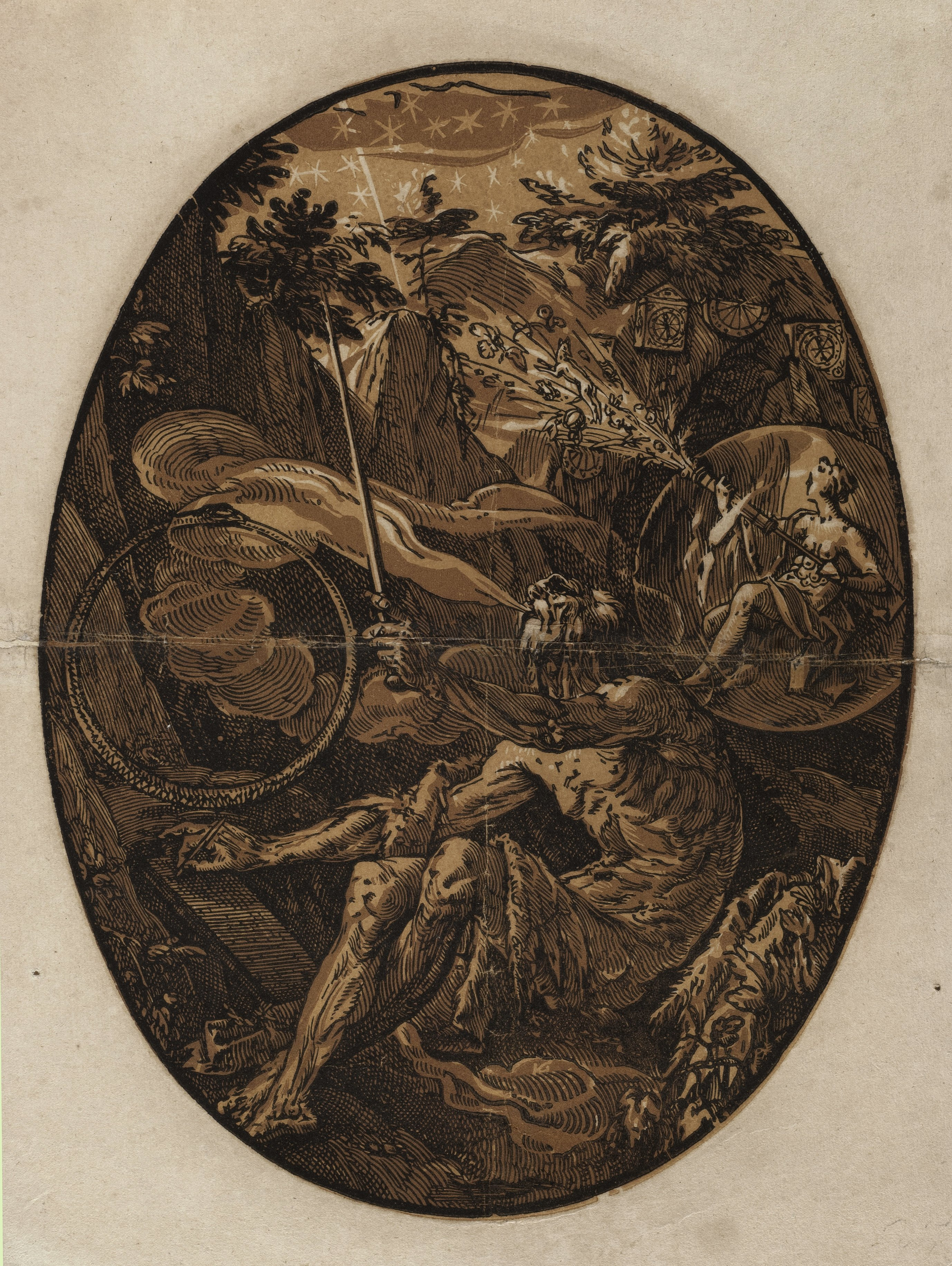
Late 16th-century Demogorgon woodcut by Hendrick Goltzius

Demogorgon is a deity or demon associated with the underworld. Although often ascribed to Greek mythology, the name probably arises from an unknown copyist's misreading of a commentary by a fourth-century scholar, Lactantius Placidus. The concept itself can be traced back to the original misread term demiurge.

== Etymology ==
The origins of the name Demogorgon are not entirely clear, though the most prevalent scholarly view now considers it to be a misreading of the Greek δημιουργόν (dēmiourgón, accusative case form of δημιουργός, 'demiurge') based on the manuscript variations in the earliest known explicit reference in Lactantius Placidus (Jahnke 1898, Sweeney 1997, Solomon 2012). Boccaccio, in his influential Genealogia Deorum Gentilium, cites a now-lost work by Theodontius and that master's acknowledged Byzantine source "Pronapides the Athenian" as authority for the idea that Demogorgon is the antecedent of all the gods. Art historian Jean Seznec concludes that "Demogorgon is a grammatical error, become god."

The name variants cited by Ricardus Jahnke include the Latin "demoirgon", "emoirgon", "demogorgona", "demogorgon", with the first critical editor Friedrich Lindenbrog (Fridericus Tiliobroga) having conjectured "δημιουργόν" as the prototype in 1600. Various other theories suggest that the name is derived from a combination of the Greek words δαίμων daimon ('spirit' given the Christian connotations of 'demon' in the early Middle Ages)—or, less likely δῆμος dêmos ("people")—and γοργός gorgós ("quick") or Γοργών Gorgṓn, the monsters of Ancient Greek mythology first attested in Hesiod's Theogony.

== Derivation and history ==
Demogorgon is first mentioned in the commentary on Statius's Thebaid often attributed in manuscripts to a Lactantius Placidus, (c. 350–400 AD). The Lactantius Placidus commentary became the most common medieval commentary on the poem by Statius and is transmitted in most early editions up to 1600. The commentary has been attributed incorrectly to a different Lactantius, the Christian author Lucius Caelius Firmianus Lactantius, even though the commentator appears to have been Mithraic.

The name Demogorgon is introduced in a discussion of Thebaid 4.516, which mentions "the supreme being of the threefold world" (triplicis mundi summum). In one manuscript, the author says of Statius, Dicit deum Demogorgona summum, cuius scire nomen non licet ("He is speaking of the Demogorgon, the supreme god, whose name it is not permitted to know", or perhaps "He is speaking of a god, the supreme Demogorgon"). Prior to Lactantius, there is no mention of the supposed "Demogorgon" anywhere by any writer, pagan or Christian. However, as noted above, there are several different manuscript traditions, including one that gives "demoirgon", which has been taken by most critical editors to indicate some form of misconstruction of the Greek dēmiourgon. Jahnke thus restores the text to read "He is speaking of the Demiurge, whose name it is not permitted to know". However, this phantom word in one of the manuscript traditions took on a life of its own among later scholars.

In the Early Middle Ages, Demogorgon is mentioned in the tenth-century Adnotationes super Lucanum, a series of short notes to Lucan's Pharsalia that are included in the Commenta Bernensia, the "Berne Scholia on Lucan".

By the Late Middle Ages, the reality of a primordial "Demogorgon" was so well fixed in the European imagination that "Demogorgon's son Pan" became a bizarre variant reading for "Hermes' son Pan" in one manuscript tradition of Boccaccio's Genealogia Deorum gentilium ("Genealogies of the Gods":1.3–4 and 2.1), misreading a line in Ovid's Metamorphoses.

Boccaccio's Demogorgon is mentioned as a "primal" god in quite a few Renaissance texts, and impressively glossed "Demon-Gorgon," i.e., "Terror-Demon" or "God of the Earth". The French historian and mythographer Jean Seznec, for instance, now determines in Demogorgon an allusion to the Demiurge ("Craftsman" or "Maker") of Plato's Timaeus. For a remarkable early text identifying Ovid's Demiurge (1/1, here) as "sovereign Demogorgon", see the paraphrase of Metamorphoses I in Abraham France, The third part of the Countesse of Pembrokes Yuychurch (London, 1592), sig. A2v."

== In literature ==
Demogorgon was taken up by Christian writers as a demon of Hell:

Orcus and Ades, and the dreaded name
Of Demogorgon

— John Milton, Paradise Lost II. 966.

Note, however, Milton does not refer to the inhabitants of Hell, but of an unformed region where Chaos rules with Night. In Milton's epic poem Satan passes through this region while traveling from Hell to Earth.

Demogorgon's name was earlier invoked by Faustus in Scene III of Christopher Marlowe's Doctor Faustus (1590) when the eponymous Doctor summons Mephistopheles with a Latin incantation.

The sixteenth-century Dutch demonologist Johann Weyer described Demogorgon as the master of fate in Hell's hierarchy.

According to Ariosto's lesser work I Cinque Canti, Demogorgon has a splendid temple palace in the Imavo mountains (today's Himalaya) where every five years the Fates and genii are all summoned to appear before him and give an account of their actions. They travel through the air in various strange conveyances, and it is no easy matter to distinguish between their convention and a Witches' Sabbath. When elements of Ariosto's poem supplied Philippe Quinault's libretto for Jean-Baptiste Lully's opera Roland, performed at Versailles, 8 January 1685, Demogorgon was king of the fairies and master of ceremonies.

Demogorgon also is mentioned in the Book II of the epic poem El Bernardo, written in Mexico by Bernardo de Balbuena and published in Spain in 1624. The passage tells how the fairy "Alcina" visits Demogorgon in his infernal palace:

Aquí Demogorgon está sentado
en su banco fatal, cuyo decreto
de las supremas causas es guardado
por inviolable y celestial preceto.
Las parcas y su estambre delicado
a cuyo huso el mundo está sujeto,
la fea muerte y el vivir lucido
y el negro lago del oscuro olvido
— (Libro II, estrofa 19)

Demogorgon is mentioned in Edmund Spenser's The Faerie Queene:

A bold bad man, that dar'd to call by name
Great Gorgon, Prince of darknesse and dead night,
At which Cocytus quakes, and Styx is put to flight.
— (Canto I, stanza 37)

and:

Downe in the bottome of the deepe Abysse
Where Demogorgon in dull darknesse pent,
Farre from the view of Gods and heauens blis,
The hideous Chaos keepes, their dreadfull dwelling is.
— (Book IV, Canto ii, stanza 47)

Demogorgon is the central character in Voltaire's 1756 short story "Plato's Dream" – a "lesser superbeing" who was responsible for creating the planet Earth.

He is also the protagonist of an opera, Il Demogorgone, ovvero il filosofo confuso ("Demogorgon, or the Confused Philosopher") by Vincenzo Righini (1786), with a libretto by Lorenzo da Ponte, which originally was written for Mozart.

One of the lead characters pretends to be Demogorgon in Johann Karl August Musäus' literary fairy tale "Rolands Knappen" ('Roland's Squires') from Volksmärchen der Deutschen (volume 1, 1782).

In Herman Melville's 1851 novel Moby-Dick, the first mate of the ship Pequod, Starbuck, describes the white whale as the "demigorgon [sic]" of the ship's "heathen crew" (see ch. XXXVIII, paragraph 2).

Demogorgon also appears as a character in Percy Bysshe Shelley's Prometheus Unbound. In this lyrical drama, Demogorgon is the offspring of Jupiter and Thetis who eventually dethrones Jupiter. It is never mentioned whether Demogorgon, portrayed as a dark, shapeless spirit, is female or male. The theory of Demogorgon's name originating from Greek demos and gorgos may be the foundation for its use in this text as an allusion to a politically active and revolutionary populace. Shelley's allusions to the French Revolution support this.

In the poem "Demogorgon" by Álvaro de Campos, the writer is afraid of becoming mad by learning the true nature and unveiling the mystery of life.

== In popular culture ==
=== Commedia dell'arte ===
The eighteen-century author of Venetian commedia dell'arte, Carlo Gozzi, mentions Demogorgone to be the "god of fairies" (Dio delle Fate) in the prologue to the first act of his comedy Il re cervo (The Stag King).

=== Dungeons & Dragons ===
In the Dungeons & Dragons fantasy role-playing game, Demogorgon is a powerful demon prince. He is known as the Prince of Demons, a self-proclaimed title, but one that is acknowledged by mortals and even his fellow demons because of his power and influence. Demogorgon was also named an "iconic D&D character" by Witwer et al. and one of the greatest villains in D&D history by the final print issue of Dragon. He is depicted as an eighteen foot tall, reptilian (or amphibious) hermaphroditic tanar'ri (a type of demon) with a somewhat humanoid form. Demogorgon first appeared in the original edition of Dungeons and Dragons, in Eldritch Wizardry (1976), and has appeared in every subsequent edition of the game. Already in 1976 miniatures of Demogorgon were produced by Minifigs based on "Gygax's specifications and Dave Sutherland's illustration from Eldritch Wizardry."

=== Moby Dick ===
In chapter 38 of the Herman Melville novel Moby Dick, the character Starbuck refers to the whale Moby Dick as a Demogorgon.

== See also ==
- Christian demons in popular culture
- Abaddon, an angel of the abyss (known in Greek as Apollyon)
- Pseudo-mythology
