= Plato's Dream =

1756 short story by Voltaire

- Author: Voltaire
- Original title: Songe de Platon
- Language: French
- Genre: Science fiction
- Published: 1756

"Plato's Dream" (original French title "Songe de Platon") is a 1756 short story written in the 18th century by the French philosopher and satirist Voltaire. Along with his 1752 novella Micromégas, "Plato's Dream" is among the first modern works in the genre of science fiction.

== Plot summary ==
"Plato's Dream" is a pointed philosophical criticism of religious doctrine, told as a dream contained within the framework of a famous (and religiously tolerated) personality of antiquity, Plato. Voltaire's story recounts a dream attributed to the renowned Greek philosopher, wherein Demiurgos, a god-like entity referred to as the "eternal geometer", appoints to a number of "lesser superbeings" the task of creating their own worlds. Demogorgon assumes responsibility for the creation of Earth, and is at first quite pleased with his creation, believing that he had "silenced Envy herself". That is to say, Demogorgon was so convinced of the perfection of his creation, critics and naysayers would be rendered speechless.

Much to his dismay, Demogorgon found his eminently imperfect handiwork to be the subject of ridicule by the other beings. Specifically, their onslaught of criticisms targeted the disproportionate ratio of good to evil, arguing that if his planet truly is as good as he claimed, its inhabitants would not be plagued by so much suffering.

The story draws to a close amidst a quarrel among the superbeings, who mock each other's haphazard attempts at creating their own planet. Demiurgos hushes the quarrel, ironically proclaiming: "It belongs to me alone to create things perfect and immortal". To which Demogorgon replies, "Us, for example?" This exchange satirizes the idea of the perfect, harmonious universe put forth by many religious doctrines.

== Voltaire in the context of Ancient Greek philosophy ==
Some of the most notable ancient Greek philosophers (Socrates, Plato, and Aristotle) significantly shaped the later ideas and writings propounded by French Enlightenment thinkers. The Enlightenment, which aimed to depart from various aspects of religious doctrine such as "superstition, enthusiasm, fanaticism, and supernaturalism", was driven by the philosophes. The philosophes, one of whom was Voltaire, aimed to further intellectual spheres by promoting reason, science, and rationalism as the foundations of knowledge.

Socrates, who is widely regarded as the very embodiment of these ideals, was venerated by French Enlightenment philosophers. In fact, Voltaire's contemporaries often likened him to the Socrates of their time, with many others tempted to adopt the same label. Such a desire may be observed in the writings of Denis Diderot, who penned in a manuscript: "'As he faced death, Socrates was regarded in Athens as we are today in Paris ... My dear friends, may we in every way be like Socrates, just as his reputation resembled ours at the hour of his death.'"

Voltaire, however, was not nearly as outspoken. Voltaire's attitude towards Socrates may only be inferred from his writings, where Socrates was frequently a subject of discussion. Russel Goulbourne attempts to dissect this ambiguity in his book Socrates from Antiquity to Enlightenment. He is particularly drawn to an excerpt from a letter written by Voltaire in 1737 who, the year prior, was gifted a gold bust of Socrates by the crown prince of Prussia: "This present has prompted me to reread everything Plato says about Socrates," Moreover, Socrates was the subject of a comedy written by Voltaire, aptly named Socrate. At surface value, this might suggest that, like Diderot, Voltaire revered Socrates; however, many historians would suggest that he was actually quite ambivalent about him.

According to Goulbourne, Voltaire's rereading of Plato—specifically the Platonic dialogues—informed his perspectives on religion. However, that is not to suggest that Voltaire was particularly fond of Plato's work; quite the contrary, he, among many other philosophes, considered Plato a sophist. Platonism at this time was widely regarded as "a religion that men professed from its establishment, without interruption, until lately" (trans.) That is to say, Plato's philosophy reaffirmed the hierarchical structures established by religion by suggesting that philosophical inquiry should be reserved to those capable of understanding it. This stance ran contrary to Enlightenment ideals and was therefore shunned by many. Voltaire was among those who disapproved of Platonism, criticizing Plato's "inintelligibility" and 'galimathias' as significant pitfalls. He rejected the obscurity and "inintelligibility" contained within some of Plato's most notable works, particularly Timaeus (which inspired "Plato's Dream") and the Republic, for their complicated metaphysical teachings. He viewed the foundations of Platonism as "hubristic" and convoluted.

== Themes ==
=== Religion ===
"Plato's Dream" is a critical philosophical exploration of religion and its core teachings. While not explicitly stated, Voltaire himself was highly critical of Christianity (more specifically, authority figures within the church), a stance evident in his seminal work, Candide, published in 1759.

He directly addressed his distaste for the clergy in the Philosophical Letters, most notably in the fifth letter. In it, he portrayed the clergy as a fundamentally corrupt institution, and furthermore depicted religion as a mechanism of reinforcing a social "hierarchy". In this view, the clergy, and religion more broadly, reaffirms ignorance of social realities by passing off religious teachings as objective truths.

However, in "Plato's Dream," Voltaire chose to focus more so on the philosophical foundations of religious beliefs, rather than religion as a social institution. He inquired into the existence of God by examining all the imperfection and suffering inherent in the world: "You certainly were not willing that there should remain any great number of these animals on Earth at once; for, over the course of a given year, smallpox will regularly carry off a tenth of the species, and sister maladies will taint the springs of life in the remainder". He further detailed the capriciousness of mankind, maintaining that humans themselves contribute to their own suffering: "...those who survive are occupied in lawsuits, or cutting each other's throats".

That being said, the human condition and one's innate desire for connection--and, ironically, for particularity or "distinctness" from others--play a central role in shaping the narrative's critique of Religion. For Voltaire, religion as both a philosophical and social enterprise not only perpetuates ignorance but also directly contradicts its purported aim of spreading the benevolent teachings of God--as demonstrated by the self-interested behavior of the humans occupying Demogorgon's Earth.

=== Dreams ===
Voltaire opened the narrative by stating that "In ancient times, dreams were much revered, and Plato was one of the greatest dreamers." This assertion, though it appears to be clothed in a layer of sarcasm, enhances the intricacy of the narrative, as most ancient Greeks interpreted dreams as prophetic messages from the gods. However, this idea did not originate with the ancient Greeks-- the belief in the divine origin of dreams is traceable to Ancient Mesopotamian mythology. Such an idea is most prominent in the widely recognized ancient Mesopotamian myth, the Epic of Gilgamesh. In tablet VII, Enkidu--Gilgamesh's companion--dreams of a discussion between the Gods, who are deciding his punishment for his involvement in the slaughter of the Bull of Heaven and Humbaba. Shortly thereafter, Enkidu falls ill and subsequently dies. Moreover, in the Mesopotamian deluge myth, the Epic of Atra-Hasis, the story's hero, Atrahasis is warned by Enki of the impending flood through the medium of a dream.

In terms of the Ancient Greek tradition, Plato himself contributed little to the philosophy of dreams or dreaming. He did, however, endorse the idea that dreams stemmed from a divine source, a perspective observable in one of his most notable dialogues, Crito. On a more controversial note, in The Republic, Plato dons a perspective that closely resembles a Freudian interpretation of dreams, despite writing centuries before him: "…in all of us, even the most highly respectable, there is a lawless wild beast nature, which peers out in sleep".

Ancient Greeks' veneration for dreams and their divine sources is vital to Voltaire's narrative, as it not only adds a layer of depth to his overarching critique of religious practitioners, but also very subtly (and almost imperceptibly) critiques society's inclination to seek out religious, as opposed to rational, explanations of social or natural phenomenon.

=== Ignorance versus enlightenment ===
At the end of the story, Voltaire alludes to Plato's allegory of the cave: "Demiurgos scowled, and with that Plato awoke. Or did he?" Much like Voltaire's use of a dream as figurative and metaphorical device, Plato employed imagery of a cave to represent ignorance. Those who partake in a "cavic existence" only know what life is like inside the cave. They accept the illusions within the cave's walls as truth, rarely ever stopping to question what life might be like beyond their own echo-chamber. Really, it is a demonstration of two vastly different "states of consciousness," where one man becomes aware of the life beyond his familiar existence, while the other remains trapped by his own ignorance.

This idea is inextricably linked to Voltaire's brief yet highly significant mention of ancient Greek perspectives on dreams, as Voltaire too views willful ignorance as an affront to reason.

== See also ==
- Satire
- Theodicy
- Ancient Greek philosophy
- Letters on the English
- Eschatology
- Philosophes
- Sophist
