= Charles Cayley =

English linguist and translator

Charles Bagot Cayley (1823–1883) was an English linguist, best known for translating Dante into the metre of the original, with annotations. He also made metrical versions of Homer's Iliad, the Prometheus of Æschylus, and Il Canzoniere of Petrarch.

He was born in St Petersburg, the son of an English merchant. His brother was the mathematician Arthur Cayley.

From Mr Pollecary's school, Blackheath, Charles Cayley went to Trinity College, Cambridge, graduating in 1845 with a BA in the classical tripos. He also studied at King's College London, under Gabriele Rossetti.

In his youth he obtained a post in the Patent Office, but gave this up when he embarked on an early venture into billboard advertising at railway stations. The venture was ahead of its time and he lost most of his money. The rest of his life he spent in relative poverty. The accounts of William Michael Rossetti (brother of Christina) portray him as a shy and unworldly intellectual with a cerebral sense of humour.

He was a leading figure in the London Philological Society. He is said to have been asked by the Society for Promoting Christian Knowledge to translate the New Testament into Iroquois; not knowing Iroquois, he allegedly learnt sufficient of the language in one month to be able to complete the task.

He fell in love with the poet Christina Rossetti, proposing in 1866, but she felt unable to marry him because he was an agnostic (she was a High Church Anglican). They remained close friends until his death, and several of her poems were written with him in mind.

The translations from the ancient Greek are a laboured attempt to mirror the versification rules of the originals. His version of The Divine Comedy is much more successful, preserving the Dante's terza rima rhyme scheme while using a relatively simple English which reflects Dante's own use of ordinary Italian. Charles Bagot Cayley also published a collection of his own poems, Psyche's Interludes.

== See also ==
- English translations of Homer: Charles Cayley
