= Mark Griffith =

British classical scholar

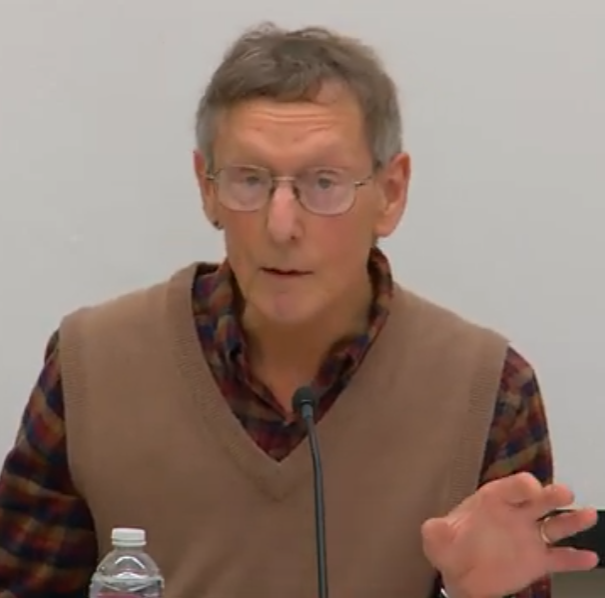

Academic background
- Education: Peterhouse, Cambridge

Academic work
- Discipline: Classics
- Sub-discipline: Ancient Greek literature
- Institutions: Harvard University; University of California, Berkeley
- Notable works: The Authenticity of Prometheus Bound (1977)

Mark Griffith is a British classical scholar, known above all for his work on Greek tragedy.

== Biography ==
Griffith studied as an undergraduate at Peterhouse in the University of Cambridge from 1965 to 1968, when he graduated BA. He then taught for a year at Mill Hill School, London (1968–1969), before returning to Peterhouse for his doctorate. He was appointed a junior research fellow at Peterhouse in 1972, and obtained his doctorate in 1973.

His doctoral thesis was on the subject of the authenticity of Prometheus Bound, a tragedy traditionally attributed to Aeschylus. The subject was suggested to Griffith by Denys Page. Griffith took up the topic without expecting to find significant grounds for denying Aeschylean authorship, but found a wide range of stylistic, metrical and other criteria on which the play does not match the usage of Aeschylus in his other works, and therefore concluded that the play is probably not by Aeschylus. This conclusion had been proposed before, for instance by Wilhelm Schmid, but on the basis of arguments that were not fully convincing, and without gaining widespread acceptance. Griffith's full discussion of the question was published as The Authenticity of Prometheus Bound in 1977, and was regarded by other scholars as presenting a convincing case for non-Aeschylean authorship, especially by Martin Litchfield West, who stated that in light of Griffith's book "the evidence against the Aeschylean authorship of the Prometheus is now overwhelming".

Following the completion of his doctorate, Griffith moved to the United States in 1973, serving as an acting assistant professor at the University of California, Berkeley from 1973 to 1974, and as an assistant professor at Harvard University from 1974 to 1977. In 1976, he was appointed assistant professor of classics at Berkeley, and was then promoted to associate professor and full professor, serving as chair of the Classics department in 1990–1993 and 1996–1997. In 1998, he was additionally appointed as professor of theater, dance and performance studies, serving as chair of that department in 1998–2000, fall 2002, fall 2003, and 2008–2009. In 2007, he was appointed Klio Distinguished Professor of Classical Languages and Literature.

He was an editor of Classical Antiquity from 1981 to 1985 and from 2003 to 2016, and served as chief editor between 2004 and 2016.

Griffith retired at the end of June 2020. Although he asked his colleagues not to arrange a Festschrift or conference in his honour, the editors of Classical Antiquity found that a number of articles by distinguished former students were submitted to the journal around the time of his retirement, and included these articles in the October 2020 issue of the journal, dedicating this issue to Griffith. He continued to serve as a professor in the Graduate School until 2023.

== Selected publications ==
=== Monographs ===
- Griffith, Mark (1977). The Authenticity of Prometheus Bound. Cambridge University Press. ISBN 9780521038140.
- Griffith, Mark (2013). Aristophanes' Frogs. Oxford University Press. ISBN 9780199339495.

=== Editions of ancient texts ===
- Griffith, Mark (1983). Aeschylus: Prometheus Bound. Cambridge University Press. ISBN 9780521270113.
- Griffith, Mark (1999). Sophocles: Antigone. Cambridge University Press. ISBN 9780521337014.

=== Collection of articles ===
- Griffith, Mark (2015). Greek Satyr Play: Five Studies. California Classical Studies. ISBN 9781939926043.

=== Edited volume ===
- Griffith, Mark; Mastronarde, D. J., eds. (1990). Cabinet of the Muses: Essays on Classical and Comparative Literature in Honor of Thomas G. Rosenmeyer. Scholars Press. ISBN 9781555404093.
