= Prometheus the Fire-Bringer =

Lost tragedy by Aeschylus

Prometheus the Fire-Bringer (Ancient Greek: Προμηθεὺς Πυρφόρος, Promētheús Pyrphóros) was probably the final play in the Prometheia trilogy traditionally ascribed to the 5th century BC Greek tragedian Aeschylus.

== Prequels ==
As conventionally reconstructed, this trilogy reimagines the myths of Prometheus found in Hesiod's Theogony and Works and Days. In the first play, Prometheus Bound, the Titan is chained to a rock and tortured for giving fire to humankind, as well as teaching them other arts of civilization. In the sequel, Prometheus Unbound, the Greek hero Heracles kills the eagle that Zeus sent to consume Prometheus' regenerating liver every day, and then frees the Titan from his chains.

== Surviving textual evidence ==
Only a single line of dialogue survives from Fire-Bringer:

Quiet, where need is; and talking to the point.

Additionally, according to a scholium at line 94 of Prometheus Bound, the Titan claims in Fire-Bringer that he had been bound for thirty-thousand years.

== Subject matter ==
Despite the paucity of direct evidence, Prometheus' foreshadowing of future events in the trilogy's first play suggests that the final play concerned itself with Prometheus' knowledge of a secret that could potentially lead to Zeus's downfall, and how the revelation of this secret leads to reconciliation between the Titan and Olympian. The secret is this: Thetis the Nereid, whom Zeus wants to take as a lover, is fated to bear a child greater than its father. Lying with her, then, would result in Zeus's being overthrown just as he had overthrown his own father, Cronus. During the course of the drama, Prometheus decides to warn Zeus about Thetis. Rather than lie with her, Zeus marries her off to the mortal Peleus, King of Aegina. The product of this union will indeed be a son greater than the father, namely Achilles, Greek hero of the Trojan War. Consequently, Zeus reconciles with Prometheus.

Finally, Athenaeus wrote of a contemporary Athenian festival dedicated to Prometheus:

Aeschylus clearly states in the Unbound that in honor of Prometheus we place a garland on the head as recompense of his bondage.

Some scholars have taken this to mean that in the Unbound, Prometheus prophesies that eventually (in the Fire-Bringer), Zeus would reconcile with him, and institute some kind of festival in his honor. Given the title of the play, and considering that Aeschylus' Oresteia provides an aetiology for Athens's Areopagus, it has been suggested that Prometheus the Fire-Bringer concludes with providing an aetiology for a yearly Athenian torch race honoring the Titan.

A minority of scholars believe that Prometheus the Fire-Bringer is actually the first play in the trilogy. One reason is that Prometheus Bound begins in medias res. According to this theory, Prometheus the Fire-Bringer would dramatize the Titan's theft of fire as described in the Theogony.
