= Classical Antiquity (journal) =

Academic journal

- Discipline: Classical antiquity
- Language: English
- Edited by: Mario Telò

Publication details
- Former name: California Studies in Classical Antiquity
- History: 1982–present
- Publisher: University of California Press (United States)
- Frequency: Biannual

Standard abbreviations
- ISO 4: Class. Antiq.

Indexing
- ISSN: 0278-6656 (print); 1067-8344 (web)
- LCCN: 83640320
- OCLC no.: 27357526

Links
- Journal homepage; Online access

Classical Antiquity is a biannual peer-reviewed academic journal that covers all topics pertaining to the field of classics, including Greek and Roman literature, history, archaeology, art, philosophy and philology, from the Bronze Age through Late Antiquity. It is published by the University of California Press (located in Oakland) on behalf of the Department of Classics, since 2020 the Department of Ancient Greek and Roman Studies (DAGRS) by faculty vote, of the University of California, Berkeley.

Publication is in electronic format only. Illustrations are embedded. Issues or subscriptions may be purchased by individuals or institutions at the editorial site maintained at Berkeley. Some few articles are available for free. First-page previews are available for all articles. The offerings are viewable without login. Any transactions require registration and individual or institutional login.

== Brief publication history ==
The journal is the creation of the former Classics Department of the University of California (UC), Berkeley. Volume 1 is dated January, 1968. The yearly volume number has been continued since then. The first volumes were annual and hard-cover published under the name California Studies in Classical Antiquity. In 1982 the name was shortened to the current name, the binding was changed to soft-cover, and two issues in April and October replaced the annual. The volume scheme was continued, but each volume now had Issue 1 and Issue 2.

== Content ==
The general topic of the journal is classical antiquity, a well-known term in academic circles of the liberal arts. It comprises studies of the Greco-Roman cultures dated roughly from the Bronze Age to the Roman Empire, which were located around the Mediterranean. The times and dates are not precisely defined. Some would exclude the Bronze Age, placing it in a parallel category. Others would extend the Roman Empire date into post-Roman late antiquity, often considered part of the Middle Ages. The creators of the journal prefer the most expansive view, as well as the broadest range of topics from "Greek and Roman literature, history, archaeology, visual culture, philosophy and philology, ...."

== Publication process ==
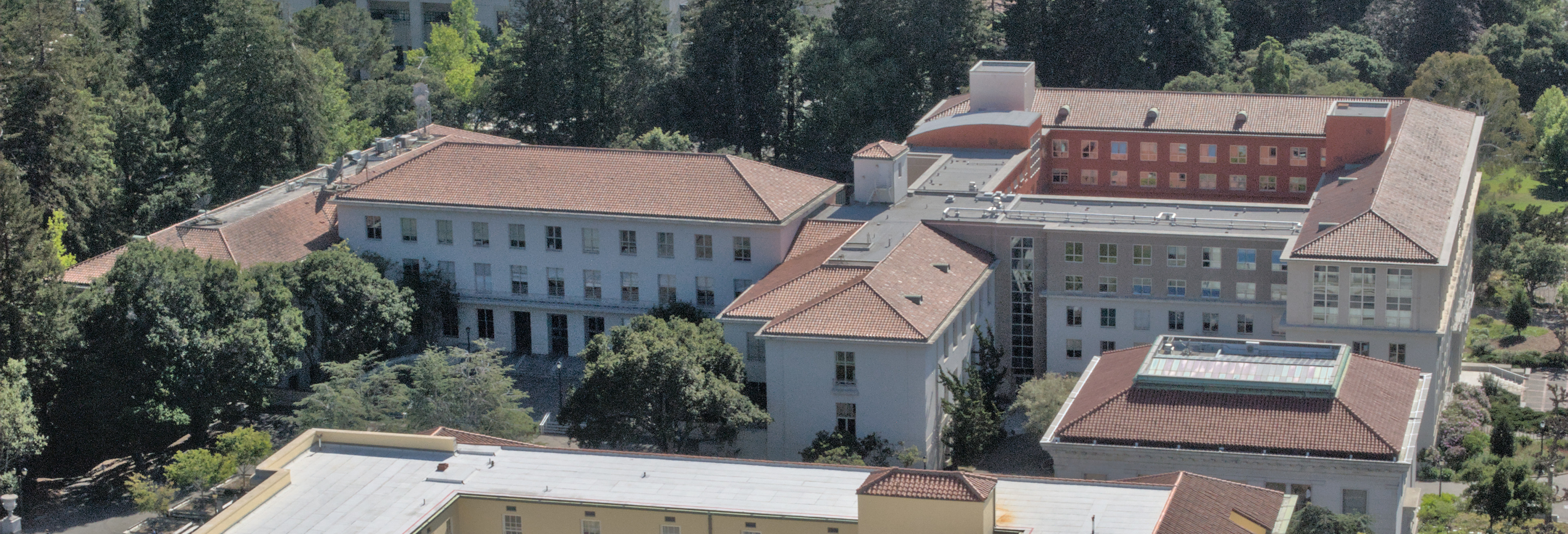
Dwinelle Hall, home of DAGRS at UC Berkeley

The publication process is deliberately networked and democratic. Articles may be submitted by anyone to an editorial board tasked with the function of selecting which ones are to be published. UC Berkeley DAGRS retains the position of chief editor, but otherwise the several-member editorial board has been chosen from educational institutions along the west coast and in Arizona. The current editor-in-chief, or "chair," of the editorial board is Mario Telò (UC, Berkeley).

The articles submitted must be in specified format and must omit any reference to the author. They may have been published elsewhere before. The board then sorts the candidates based on the needs of the journal and the merits of the articles. The authors are not named until after the decisions have been made.

== Chief editors ==
Chief editors of the journal have included:

- Donald Mastronarde, 1992–1996
- Ralph Hexter, 1996–1998
- Leslie Kurke, 1998–2003
- Mark Griffith, 2004–2016
- Leslie Kurke, 2016–2018
- Mario Telò, since 2018

== Abstracts and indices ==
A number of external agents have created abstracts, indices, or both:

- Arts & Humanities Citation Index
- Current Contents/Arts and Humanities
- British Humanities Index
- International Bibliography of Periodical Literature
- International Bibliography of Book Reviews of Scholarly Literature and Social Sciences
- Russian Academy of Sciences Bibliographies
- Scopus
