= Starbuck =

Starbucks is a chain of coffee shops.

Starbuck or Starbucks may also refer to:

== People ==
- Starbuck (surname), list of people with the family name
- StarBuck, ring name of professional wrestler Michael Majalahti

== Places ==
=== Antarctica ===
- Starbuck Cirque, Oates Land
- Starbuck Crater, Marie Byrd Land
- Starbuck Glacier, Graham Land
- Starbuck Peak, on South Georgia

=== North America ===
- Starbuck, Manitoba, Canada
- Starbuck, Minnesota, US
- Starbuck, Washington, US

=== Oceania ===
- Starbuck Island, an atoll of the Line Islands

== Arts, entertainment, and media ==
=== Fictional characters ===
- Starbuck, in Melville's 1851 novel Moby-Dick
- Lieutenant Starbuck, in the 1978 Battlestar Galactica film and TV series
- Dana Scully, from The X-Files TV series (1993–2018) - was nicknamed Starbuck by her father
- Kara Thrace, a character in the 2004 Battlestar Galactica TV series - her callsign was Starbuck
- Starbuck, in the 1999 novel Fire Bringer
- Starbuck, in Nash's 1950s play The Rainmaker or its adaptations
- Starbuck, in Joan D. Vinge's 1980 novel The Snow Queen
- Jason Starbuck, a character in the 1947 novel Yankee Pasha
- Starbuck, a dog in the 2026 movie The End of Oak Street

=== Film and television ===
- Starbuck (film), a 2011 Canadian comedy
- J.J. Starbuck, a crime drama series

=== Music ===
- Starbuck (band), an American rock band
- Starbucks (mixtape), a mixtape by All Star Cashville Prince and Young Buck
- "Starbucks" (song), a 2002 song by A

== Other businesses ==
- Starbuck Car and Wagon Company, a 19th-century manufacturer of trams in Birkenhead, England

== See also ==
- Starbeck, an area of Harrogate in North Yorkshire, England
