= Prometheia =

Trilogy of plays about the Titan Prometheus

The Prometheia (Ancient Greek: Προμήθεια) is a trilogy of plays about the Titan Prometheus. It was attributed in Antiquity to the 5th-century BC Greek tragedian Aeschylus. Though an Alexandrian catalogue of Aeschylean play titles designates the trilogy Hoi Prometheis ("the Prometheuses"), in modern scholarship the trilogy has been designated the Prometheia to mirror the title of Aeschylus' only extant trilogy, the Oresteia. Unlike the Oresteia, only one play from this trilogy—Prometheus Bound—survives. Inasmuch as the authorship of Prometheus Bound continues to be debated, the very existence of a Prometheus trilogy is uncertain. To the extent that modern scholars postulate the existence of such a trilogy by a single author, the consensus holds that it comprised Prometheus Bound, Prometheus Unbound, and Prometheus the Fire-Bringer, in that order.

== Prometheus Bound ==
The dramatis personae are Prometheus, Cratus (Power), Bia (Violence), Hephaestus, the mortal woman Io, Oceanus, Hermes and a chorus of Oceanids. The play is composed almost entirely of speeches and contains little plot since its protagonist is chained and immobile throughout. At the beginning, Cratus, Bia and Hephaestus the smith-god chain Prometheus to a mountain in the Caucasus and then depart. According to Aeschylus, Prometheus is being punished not only for stealing fire (theft of fire), but also for thwarting Zeus' plan to obliterate the human race. This punishment is especially galling since Prometheus was instrumental in Zeus' victory in the Titanomachy. The Oceanids appear and attempt to comfort Prometheus by conversing with him. Prometheus cryptically tells them that he knows of a potential marriage that would lead to Zeus' downfall. Oceanus later arrives to commiserate with Prometheus, as well; he urges the Titan to make peace with Zeus, and departs. Prometheus is then visited by Io, a maiden pursued by a lustful Zeus. The Olympian transformed her into a cow, and a gadfly sent by Hera has chased her all the way from Argos; Prometheus forecasts her future travels, telling her that Zeus will eventually end her torment in Egypt, where she will bear a son named Epaphus. He adds that one of her descendants (Heracles), eleven generations hence, will release him from his own torment. Finally, Hermes the messenger-god is sent down by an angered Zeus to demand that Prometheus tell him who threatens to overthrow him. Prometheus refuses, and Zeus strikes him with a thunderbolt that plunges Prometheus into the abyss.

== Prometheus Unbound ==
Only eleven fragments of Prometheus Unbound survive, in the form of quotations preserved by later authors. Nonetheless, our knowledge of the Prometheus myth as told by Hesiod and predictions of future events made by the Titan himself in Prometheus Bound allow scholars to reconstruct a fairly detailed outline of this play. An erroneous list of Prometheus Bound's dramatis personæ indicates that Gaea and Heracles both appear in this play. A fragment translated into Latin by the Roman statesman Cicero demonstrates that the chorus of this play is constituted by a group of Titans, recently freed from Tartarus by Zeus despite their defeat in the Titanomachy. This perhaps foreshadows Zeus' eventual reconciliation with Prometheus in the trilogy's third installment. Prometheus complains to them about his torment just as he had to the chorus of Oceanids in Prometheus Bound. It is then suggested that Gaea would be the next to visit Prometheus, in a role that echoes Oceanus' sympathetic turn in the first play. Finally, Heracles would visit Prometheus. Again mirroring events in the previous play, Prometheus would forecast Heracles' remaining travels as he completes his Twelve Labours. Heracles then frees Prometheus from his chains and kills the eagle that tortured him daily. The play thus concludes with Prometheus free from the torments of Zeus, but the Titan and Olympian have yet to reconcile.

== Prometheus the Fire-Bringer ==
Only one fragment survives from this play. Despite the paucity of direct evidence, Prometheus' foreshadowing of future events in the trilogy's first play suggests that the final play concerned itself with Prometheus' knowledge of a secret that could potentially lead to Zeus' downfall, and how the revelation of this secret leads to reconciliation between the Titan and Olympian. The secret is this: the sea nymph Thetis, whom Zeus wants to take as a lover, is fated to bear a child greater than its father. Lying with her, then, would result in Zeus' being overthrown just as he had overthrown his father, Cronus. During the course of the drama, Prometheus decides to warn Zeus about Thetis. Rather than lie with her, Zeus marries her off to the mortal Peleus, King of Aegina. The product of this union will indeed be a son greater than the father, namely Achilles, Greek hero of the Trojan War. Finally, Athenaeus (a grammarian of the 2nd and 3rd centuries AD) wrote in Book 15.16 of his Deipnosophists the following regarding a contemporary Athenian festival dedicated to Prometheus: "Aeschylus clearly states in the Unbound that in honor of Prometheus we place a garland on the head as recompense of his bondage." Some scholars have taken this to mean that in the Unbound, Prometheus prophesies that eventually (in the Fire-Bringer), Zeus would reconcile with him, and establish some sort of festival in his honor. Given the title of the play, and taking a cue from the aetiology for the Athenian Areopagus provided by Aeschylus' Eumenides, it has been suggested that the drama concludes with Zeus' foundation of the yearly torch race that took place in Athens to honor Prometheus.

A minority of scholars believe that Prometheus the Fire-Bringer is actually the first play in the trilogy. One reason is that Prometheus Bound begins in medias res; some have observed that after the reconstructing the Bound and Unbound as the first and second play, there simply isn't enough mythic material left for a third-position Fire-Bringer. According to this theory, Prometheus the Fire-Bringer would dramatize the Titan's theft of fire as described in the Theogony.
