= Latimer =

Latimer may refer to:

== Places ==
=== England ===
- Latimer, Buckinghamshire, a village
  - Latimer and Ley Hill, a civil parish that until 2013 was just called "Latimer"
- Latimer, Leicester, an electoral ward and administrative division of the city of Leicester
- Burton Latimer, a small town in Northamptonshire

=== New Zealand ===
- Latimer Square, a park in Christchurch, New Zealand

=== United States ===
- Latimer, Iowa, a city
- Latimer, Kansas, a city
- Latimer, Mississippi, a census-designated place
- Latimer County, Oklahoma
- Latimer Lake, Minnesota

== People and fictional characters ==
- Latimer (surname), a list of people and fictional characters
- Latimer Whipple Ballou (1812–1900), U.S. Representative from Rhode Island
- Latimer Fuller (1870–1950), Anglican bishop, the second Bishop of Lebombo, South Africa

== Other uses ==
- Baron Latimer, a title in the peerage of England and Britain, including a list of people who have held the title
- Latimer Arts College, a foundation secondary school in Barton Seagrave, Northamptonshire, England
- HMS Latimer, a 1941 Empire ship
- USS Latimer (APA-152), a US Navy World War II attack transport
- Latimer Park, a defunct English football stadium in Burton Latimer
- Viscount Latimer

== See also ==
- Latimer diagram, a type of diagram used in electrochemistry
- R. v. Latimer (1997), a Canadian judicial decision
- R. v. Latimer (2001), a Canadian judicial decision
- Latimeria, a genus of fish
- Lattimer (disambiguation)
- Lattimore (disambiguation)
- Latymer (disambiguation)
