= Latymer =

Latymer may refer to:

== Schools in London ==
- The Latymer School, a co-educational grammar school in Edmonton
- Latymer Upper School, a co-educational independent school in Hammersmith
- Godolphin and Latymer School, an all-girls independent school in Hammersmith
- Latymer Preparatory School, a primary school associated with the Latymer Upper School foundation, Hammersmith
- Latymer All Saints Primary School, a primary school in the London Borough of Enfield

== Other uses ==
- Latymer (surname)

== See also ==
- Latimer (disambiguation)
- Lattimer (disambiguation)
- Lattimore (disambiguation)
