= 1892nd Engineer Aviation Battalion (United States) =

- Active: 1943–1946, 1950-1959
- Country: United States
- Branch: USAAF
- Type: Engineer
- Role: Constructed, maintained, and patrolled airfields in the Pacific during World War II
- Garrison/HQ: Gowen Field, Idaho
- Engagements: World War II; Ryukyu Islands Campaign; New Guinea Campaign

The 1892nd Engineer Aviation Battalion was a United States Army Air Forces unit activated on 1 May 1943 at Gowen Field (Army Air Base) in Boise, Idaho. The battalion was responsible for building, maintaining, and patrolling runways throughout the Pacific Theater during World War II. The unit was inactivated on 17 June 1946 following the end of the war. The unit was later reactivated and re-designated the 964th Engineering Construction Battalion and performed training functions in Rochester, New York and Fort Belvoir, Virginia until it was inactivated on 23 October 1959.

== World War II ==
- Overseas: 26 October 1944
- Campaigns: New Guinea, Ryukyus

=== Training and embarkation ===
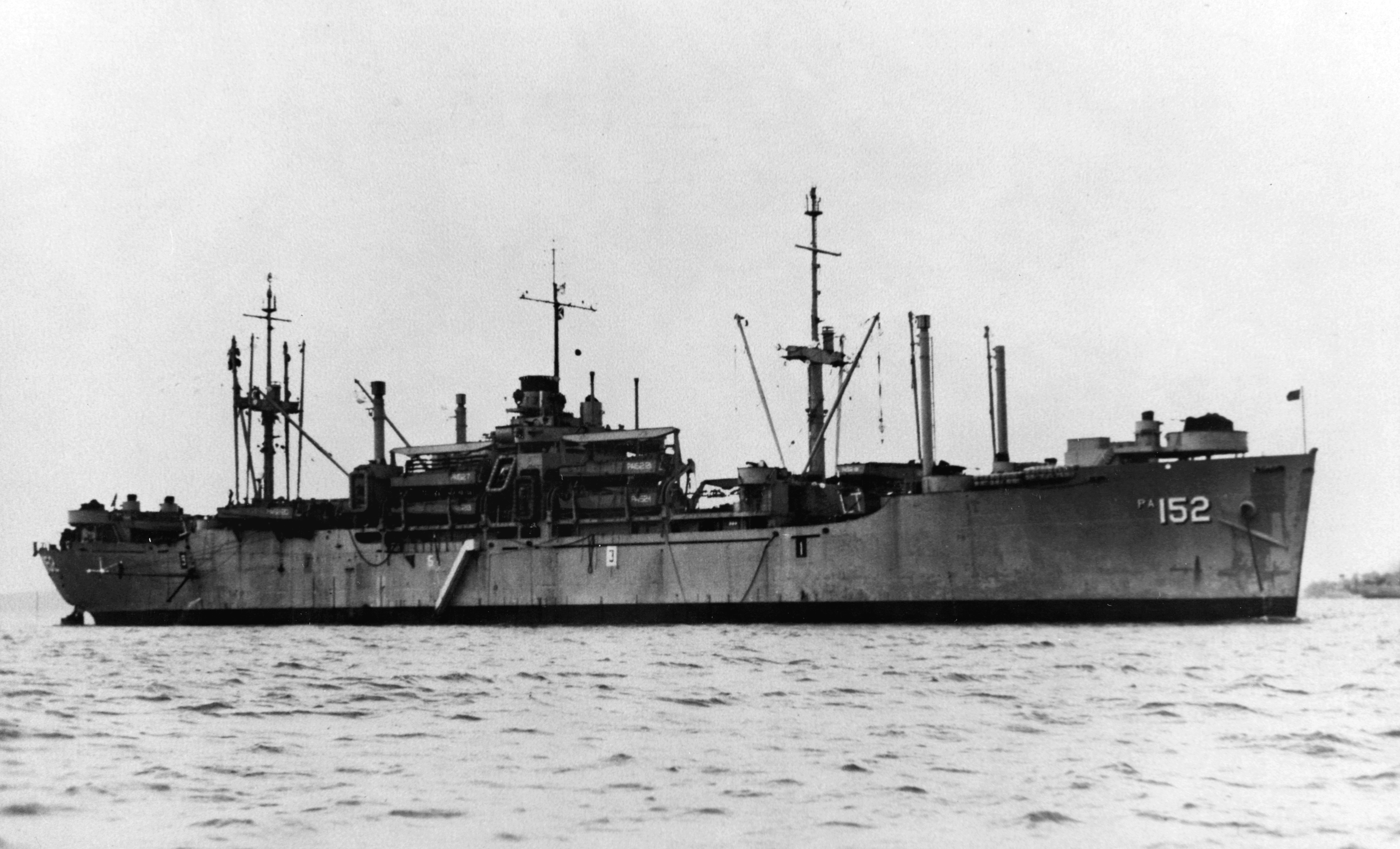
USS Latimer

Upon activation on 1 May 1943, the 1892nd Engineer Aviation Battalion was initially assigned to the 930th Engineer Aviation Regiment at Gowen Field, Boise, Idaho, Second Air Force. Later that year the battalion was transferred to the 934th Engineer Aviation Regiment for coordination and supervision of organization and training. On 13 January 1944 the unit was relocated to Geiger Field, Spokane, Washington for a temporary change of station, where the unit was reassigned to the Fourth Air Force for additional training. After training the 1892nd was transferred to Camp Anza near Riverside, California from 6 to 20 October for staging. The unit was then transferred to the San Francisco Port of Embarkation on 21 October 1944 where it remained until leaving on the USS Latimer for overseas deployment on 26 October.

=== Pacific Theater deployment ===
On 13 November 1944 the 1892nd arrived at the Oro Bay, New Guinea Pacific Theater staging area via the USS Latimer. The unit was assigned to Biak Island, Mokmer Airfield near the northern coast of Papua, New Guinea where it maintained the airfield. The airfield at Biak was under Japanese control until it was captured by the United States Army in May 1944 following the Battle of Biak.

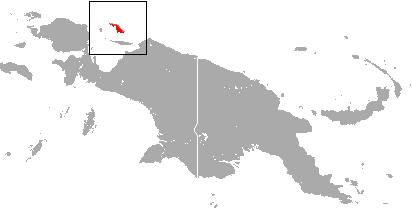
Island of Biak, North of New Guinea

On 28 January 1945 the 1892nd was transferred to the island of Luzon, the largest island in the Philippines. Then on 8 February 1945 the battalion reported that it was again in New Guinea. On 25 May 1945 the 1892nd was ordered to Okinawa for permanent change of station where it was assigned to the Far East Air Force, Fifth Air Force, 928th Engineer Aviation Regiment. The Fifth Air Force was a combat force that was assigned multiple bomber groups throughout the area, particularly Motobu Airfield on the Motobu Peninsula of Okinawa.

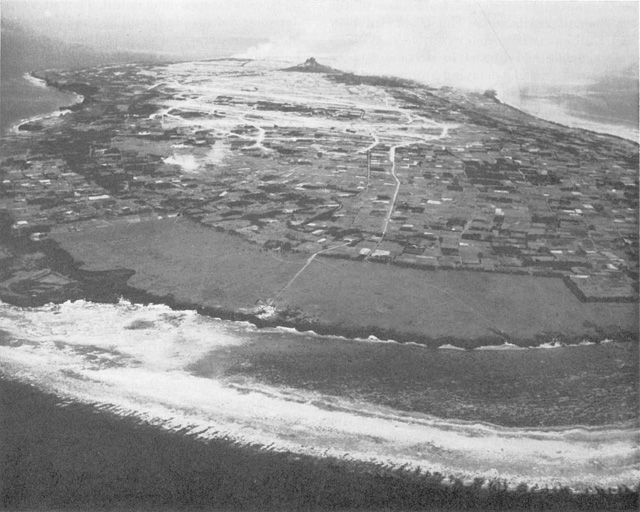
Island of Ie Shima, 1945

The 1892nd departed New Guinea on LSTs on 5 June 1945 with a destination of the Ryukyu Islands. On 22 June the unit arrived at Ie Shima (Iejima), a small island off the northwest coast of Okinawa, where it would spend the remainder of the war working on runway maintenance projects and guarding airfield assets. The island housed a 5,000+ foot runway that was constructed out of coral quarried from the island's interior; the runway was utilized by bomber aircraft groups. The battalion was stationed near the site of war correspondent Ernie Pyle's death. Pyle had been killed by a hidden Japanese machine gunner during the initial landing on the island. At the time of his unit's arrival the grave site was marked by an upturned rifle stuck in the mud with Pyle's helmet on it. It was later marked by a monument created by the 77th Infantry Division.

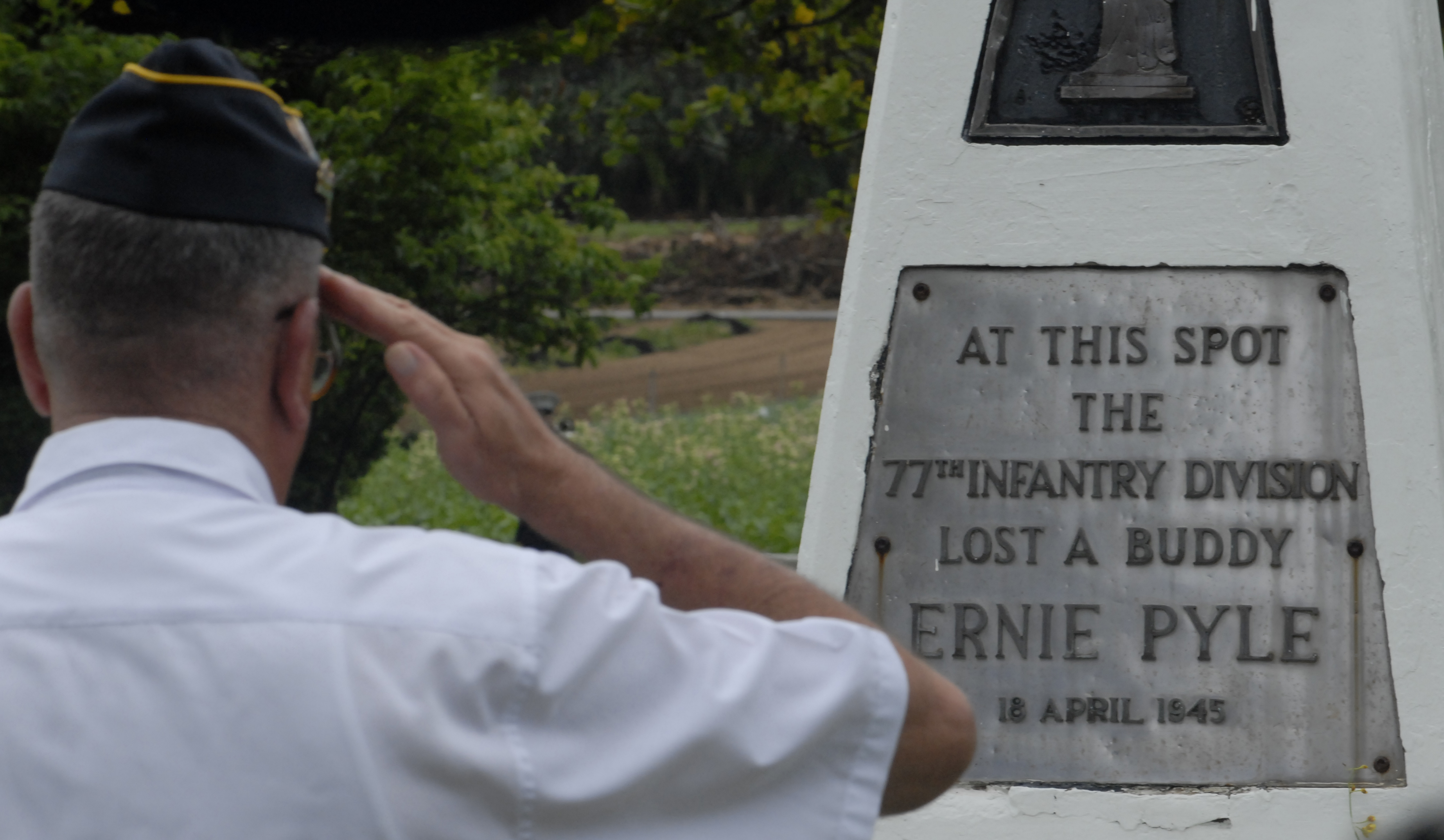
Ernie Pyle Memorial at Ie Shima, 2009

After the dropping of the atomic bomb on Nagasaki and Hiroshima as well as a declaration of war by Russia on Japan, the Japanese agreed to unconditional surrender to Allied Forces at Ie Shima. On 19 August 1945, a Japanese surrender party arrived on the island in two Betty Bombers painted white with green crosses, a color-coding that signaled to the Allies who they were and not to shoot them down.

The Japanese transferred to a C-54 transport for the trip to Manila and a meeting with General MacArthur to review the terms of surrender. Members of the 1892nd and other units stationed on the island were allowed to line the sides of the runway as the Japanese delegation landed and departed, signaling the imminent end of World War II. The 1892nd was inactivated on 17 June 1946.

Awards of the battalion included the World War II Victory Medal, American Campaign Medal, Asiatic-Pacific Campaign Medal (with Battle Stars), Army of Occupation Medal - Japan.

== Post-World War II ==
- Activated: 2 September 1948
- Inactivated: 23 October 1959

Following the war the unit was later reactivated and re-designated the 964th Engineering Construction Battalion. It performed training functions as an organized reserve unit in Rochester, New York and Fort Belvoir, Virginia until it was inactivated on 23 October 1959.

== See also ==
- 805th Engineer Aviation Battalion (United States)
- Ie Shima Airfield
