= Latimer (surname) =

Latimer is an occupation surname, meaning "interpreter" (literally "one knowing Latin"). Notable people with the surname include:

== Academics and literature ==
- Elizabeth Wormeley Latimer (1822–1904), American writer
- Jon Latimer (1964–2009), Welsh historian and writer
- Wendell Mitchell Latimer (1893–1955), American chemist
- William Latimer (priest) (1467–1545), English clergyman and scholar of Ancient Greek

== Arts and entertainment ==
- Andrew Latimer (born 1949), English rock musician
- Chloe Latimer (born 1996), Scottish singer and songwriter
- Hugh Latimer (actor) (1913–2006), English actor
- Jason Latimer (born 1981), American magician
- Jonathan Latimer (1906–1983), American crime writer
- Louise Latimer (actress) (1913–1973), American actress
- Mark Latimer, English pianist from England
- Michael Latimer (1941–2011), British actor
- Michelle Latimer, Canadian actress
- Thom Latimer (born 1986), English professional wrestler and actor

== Military ==
- Dennis Latimer (1895–1976), British World War I flying ace
- Joseph W. Latimer (1834–1863), Confederate officer from Virginia
- Kelly Latimer, former U.S. Air Force lieutenant colonel and pilot and Virgin Galactic pilot

== Politics and government ==
- Albert H. Latimer (c. 1800–1877), an Associate Justice of the Texas Supreme Court
- Asbury Latimer (1851–1908), farmer and U.S. Senator from South Carolina
- George Latimer (Minnesota politician) (born 1935), mayor of St. Paul, Minnesota
- George Latimer (New York politician) (born 1953), New York State Senator and current Westchester County Executive
- George Latimer (Pennsylvania politician) (1750–1825), Speaker of the Pennsylvania House of Representatives
- George W. Latimer (1900–1990), an Associate Justice of the Utah Supreme Court
- Graham Latimer (1926–2016), New Zealand Maori leader
- Henry Latimer (judge) (1938–2005), lawyer and judge from Florida
- Henry Latimer (politician) (1752–1819), physician and U.S. Senator from Delaware
- Hugh Latimer (c. 1485–1555), bishop and Protestant martyr from England
- Matt Latimer, lawyer in various positions during George W. Bush's presidency
- Rebecca Latimer Felton (1835–1930), teacher and U.S. Senator from Georgia
- Thomas E. Latimer (1879–1937), American lawyer
- W. Irving Latimer (1836–1922), Michigan politician
- William Latimer (Australian politician), (1858–1935), Australian politician
- William Latimer, 4th Baron Latimer (1330–1381), English noble, soldier and diplomat

== Sports ==
- Al Latimer (born 1957), American football player
- Cody Latimer (born 1992), American football player
- Don Latimer (born 1955), American football player
- Louise Latimer (tennis) (born 1978), British tennis player
- Tacks Latimer (1875–1936), American baseball catcher
- Tanerau Latimer (born 1986), New Zealand rugby union footballer
- Zach Latimer (born 1983), American football player

== Other ==
- Allie B. Latimer (born 1928), American lawyer and civil rights activist
- Catherine Allen Latimer (1896–1948), African-American librarian
- George Latimer (escaped slave) (1819–c. 1896), escaped slave whose case became a major political issue in Massachusetts
- Hugh Latimer (c. 1485–1555), English bishop and Protestant martyr
- Lewis Howard Latimer (1848–1928), African-American inventor
- Robert Latimer (born 1953), Canadian farmer and murderer
- Marjorie Courtenay-Latimer (1907–2004) South African museum worker who found the first living coelacanth (the fish genus Latimeria).

== Fictional characters ==
- Rick Latimer, in the American soap opera Love of Life
- Harold Latimer, in the Sherlock Holmes short story "The Greek Interpreter"
- Danny, Beth, Mark, and Chloe Latimer in the British murder mystery series, Broadchurch

== See also ==
- Latymer (surname), a surname
- Latimore, a surname
