= Eleanor Larrabee Lattimore =

American sociologist

- Born: March 28, 1874; Rochester, New York, U.S.
- Died: October 17, 1966 (age 92); Clifton Springs, New York, U.S.
- Occupations: Sociologist, college professor
- Relatives: Florence L. Lattimore (sister); Owen Lattimore (cousin); Eleanor Frances Lattimore (cousin); Richmond Lattimore (cousin)

Eleanor Larrabee Lattimore (March 28, 1874 – October 17, 1966) was an American sociologist and college professor. She taught sociology at the University of Buffalo and the University of Missouri.

== Early life and education ==
Lattimore was born in Rochester, New York, the daughter of Samuel Allan Lattimore and Ellen Larrabee Lattimore. Her father was a chemistry professor. Her younger sister was social worker Florence Larrabee Lattimore. Their cousins included writers Owen Lattimore, Eleanor Frances Lattimore, and Richmond Lattimore. She graduated from Bryn Mawr College in 1900, and from the University of Rochester in 1904. She completed a Ph.D. in psychology at the University of Pennsylvania. She was a member of Phi Beta Kappa.

== Career ==
Lattimore taught high school biology in Rochester after college. She was on the staff of the University of Pennsylvania's first mental health clinic in 1917. She was director of the YWCA's national research bureau, and director of education at the YWCA in Chicago. She was a sociology and psychology professor at the University of Missouri, visiting professor at Bryn Mawr College, and at the University of Buffalo from 1931. She was director of the Chicago chapter of the AAUW.

Lattimore helped to establish the first playgrounds in Rochester, and was active in the Woman's Christian Temperance Union, the Playground Association of America, the American Eugenics Association, the National Sociological Society, and the National Association of Social Workers. She took an interest in peace and international social work. "We are apt to think that American money is paying for practically all the international social service work," she told an audience in 1932. "This is not true. When one works among international groups, one learns that other countries are doing their share." She also published her eugenic studies of "degenerate and defective people". She spoke to community groups about mental health issues.

== Publications ==
- "Charts Showing the Family Histories of Certain Degenerate and Defective People in a Rural Section of Virginia" (1911)
- "The Individual Delinquent" (1915, The Psychological Clinic)
- Some Illustrative Clinic Cases (1916)
- "Transient Delusions Due to Syphilis" (1916, The Psychological Clinic)
- "The Superficial Idiot–A Type" (1917, The Psychological Clinic)
- Legal Recognition Of Industrial Women (1919, with Ray S. Trent)
- "Immigrant Workers in Steel" (1921, Foreign-Born)

== Personal life ==
Lattimore had a stroke in 1961, and was in a coma for five years until she died in 1966, at the age of 92, at a hospital in Clifton Springs, New York.
