= Florence L. Lattimore =

American writer

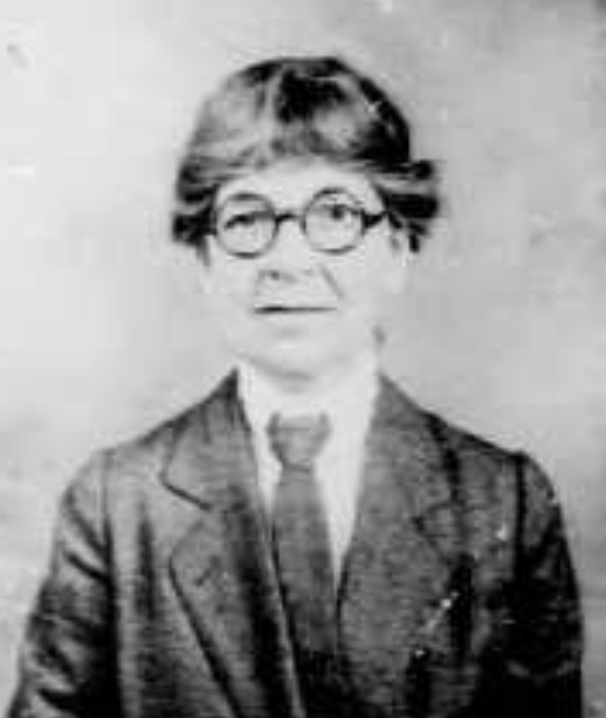
- Florence L. Lattimore, from her 1919 passport application
- Born: April 24, 1876; Rochester, New York
- Died: June 2, 1956; Monterey, Massachusetts
- Occupation(s): Writer, social worker, pacifist
- Relatives: Owen Lattimore (cousin); Eleanor Frances Lattimore (cousin); Richmond Lattimore (cousin)

Florence Larrabee Lattimore (April 24, 1876 – June 2, 1956) was an American writer and social worker associated with the Russell Sage Foundation. She was a member of the Ford Peace Ship expedition in 1915.

== Early life and education ==
Lattimore was born in Rochester, New York, the youngest daughter of Samuel Allen Lattimore and Ellen Frances Larrabee Lattimore. Her father was a chemistry professor and her mother was a poet. Her sister Rose Lattimore Alling was a probation officer and a clubwoman. Her sister Eleanor Larrabee Lattimore was a sociologist. Writers Owen Lattimore, Eleanor Frances Lattimore, and Richmond Lattimore were their cousins.

== Career ==
Lattimore was a volunteer probation officer in Rochester, like her older sister. She was assistant director of the Russell Sage Foundation's Child Helping Department until 1915. She planned and spoke at state and national conferences on child welfare. She was an officer of the National Conference of Charities and Correction in 1910. She joined the Ford Peace Ship expedition in 1915, and wrote about it for The Survey magazine.

== Publications ==
- "A Palace of Delight" (1913, Charities and Commons)
- "Skunk Hollow: The Squatter" (1914)
- Pittsburgh as a Foster Mother; A Concrete Community-Study of Child-caring Methods (1914)
- "The Children in Springfield Institutions" part of The charities of Springfield, Illinois (1916)
- "Aboard the Oscar II" (1916, The Survey)
- "Liberty and the Pursuit of Happiness" (1919, World Outlook)
- "Friendliness Enough to Go Round" (1919, World Outlook)
- Alice and Jumbo (1957, a children's book)
- The Honey Pod Tree: The Life Story of Thomas Calhoun Walker (as told to Florence L. Lattimore) (1958)

== Personal life ==
Lattimore lived with her longtime partner, Nellie May Smith (1876–1962), in New York City, and later in Monterey, Massachusetts, where Lattimore died in 1956, aged 80 years. Her will was disallowed because it included only two, not three, witness signatures. Her estate went to her sister, a niece, and two nephews, one of whom was noted geologist Harold Lattimore Alling.
