= Larimore (surname) =

Larimore is a surname. Notable people with the surname include:

- Emma Larimore (1855–1943), American educator, writer, and editor
- Eugene Earle Larimore, a.k.a. Earle Larrimore (1899–1947), American stage and film actor
- Thomas Larimore (fl. 1677–1706), English privateer and pirate
- Victoria Larimore (born 1956), American film director, television director, producer, screenwriter, and playwright

== See also ==
- Larrimore, surname
- Latimore, surname
