= Larimore =

Larimore may refer to:

- Larimore (surname)
- Larimore, North Dakota
- Larimore House, historic house in Florence, Alabama
- Wilson Larimore House, historic house in St. Louis County, Missouri

== See also ==
- Larrimore, surname
