= 805th Engineer Aviation Battalion =

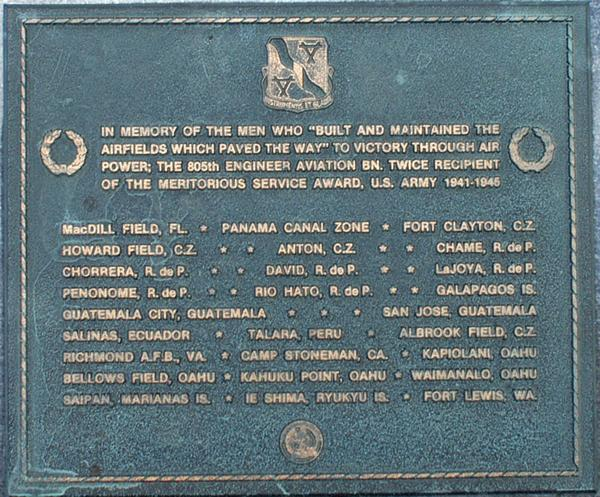
- 805th Memorial at National Museum of the US Air Force
- Active: 1941–1946
- Country: United States
- Branch: USAAF
- Type: Engineer
- Role: Constructed fighter and bomber airfields in Central America and the Pacific during World War II
- Garrison/HQ: MacDill Field, Florida
- Mottos: Instrumentis et Gladis (With Tools and Weapons)
- Colors: Scarlet and White
- Engagements: World War II; Saipan; Iejima

Commanders
- Notable commanders: Major General Lee B. Washbourne; Colonel Harry A. Hall

The 805th Engineer Aviation Battalion was an American "Arms and Services with the Army Air Forces" unit activated on 12 February 1941 at MacDill Field near Tampa, Florida. It was deactivated shortly after World War II.

== History ==
In 1939 General Hap Arnold negotiated with the U.S. Army Chief of Engineers for a special engineer unit to work with the Air Corps. The original concept envisioned a small group of skilled construction and engineer troops, closely trained alongside air units, with the ability to repair bomb damaged airfields, to camouflage airfields and if necessary, to defend airfields. These troops would also be capable of constructing light duty airfields in forward locations. After the German invasion of Poland demonstrated the value of such an organization, the War Department created the 21st Engineers (Aviation) Regiment at Fort Benning, Ga., on June 4, 1940. At first, responsibility for constructing heavy duty airfields remained with the United States Army Corps of Engineers, but by mid-1941, the mission of the aviation engineers expanded beyond runway repair and light runway construction. As the possibility of American involvement in a global war grew, the planners agreed to give the air forces enough men and equipment to construct their own heavy duty bases in forward areas. Without knowing exactly what would be needed to build air bases in deserts, in jungles and on coral islands, the planners devised the Engineering Aviation Battalion, a self-contained unit that became the core of aviation engineering efforts during World War II. Originally established with 27 engineer officers and 761 enlisted men, a battalion would be capable of "independently constructing an advanced airdrome and all appurtenances." Standard equipment for battalion deployment included diesel tractors, bulldozers, carry-all scrapers, graders, gasoline shovels, rollers, mixers, air compressors, drills, trucks, trailers, asphalting and concreting equipment, rock crushers, draglines, and pumps. Twelve EABs had been formed by the time of Pearl Harbor and sent to the Philippines, to islands across the Southwest Pacific and northward to the Aleutian Islands. Between December 1941 and December 1942, the number of battalions jumped from 12 to 51, and three-fourths of them were already overseas. Most of the enlisted men in 1942 were volunteers with construction or engineering experience, and they required little training.

- Florida The 805th Engineer Company, Aviation (Separate) was created from the inactive 2nd Battalion, 28th Engineers, Aviation. After activation at MacDill Field in Florida, the company left the base on 20 March 1941; traveling via rail to Charleston, South Carolina, for embarkation to the Panama Canal Zone.
- Panama The company arrived in Panama on 26 March 1941 and were encamped at Albrook Field. On 28 June 1941 the 805th was increased to battalion strength and subdivided into four companies (Headquarters, A, B, C). On 12 June 1942, the transport ship S.S. Sixaola was torpedoed by U-159 while transporting a detachment of the 805th to Guatemala; 28 crewmen were killed and the 805th lost a large amount of construction equipment when the ship sank near Colon, C.Z. The SS Sixaola was en route from the Canal Zone to New Orleans, Louisiana, via Guatemala carrying Army trucks and cargo with 87 merchant marine crew, 6 ship defense personnel, and 108 passengers. Two minutes after being struck by two torpedoes Captain William H. Fagan ordered the ship abandoned. Mrs. Edna T. Johansson, the first female recipient of the Merchant Marine Combat Bar with Star, was a steward aboard the ship. All survivors boarded 5 lifeboats and 6 rafts, and the ship sank when the main boiler exploded. The U-159 questioned the crew about the ship and its cargo. Some of the survivors were rescued by the SS Carolinian, USS Niagara, and Army Tug Shasta. 42 others in one lifeboat made Panama in 4 days.
- Return to the United States The 805th remained in Panama until 30 March 1943, having constructed numerous airfields in Panama, Guatemala, Ecuador, and the Galapagos Islands. The battalion traveled from Albrook Field to the New York Navy Yard on the USAT Frederick Funston, arriving there on 7 April 1943. The battalion then traveled by rail to Richmond (Virginia) Army Air Base for training and furlough.
- Hawaii The battalion departed Richmond, Virginia, in November 1943, traveling by rail to Camp Stoneman, California. After twelve days the battalion departed San Francisco on the ATS Lurline, a former luxury liner. The battalion arrived at Pearl Harbor on 20 December 1943, and were encamped at Bellows Field. While stationed on Oahu the battalion was assigned to lengthen and widen the landing strip at Kahuku, on the northern end of Oahu (Google Maps Pin). The runway was being modified to accommodate the new B-29s, which were still on the manufacturing line in the United States. This runway was going to be a stopover point for the planes on their way to the Western Pacific.
- Saipan On 7 June 1944, the battalion departed Oahu on the SS Mormacport. On 25 June 1944, the 805th arrived offshore at Saipan, an island in the Marianas chain. The battalion landed on 27 June, (d-day +2) and commenced repairing and expanding the existing Japanese airfield to accommodate B-29s. Four months later, the first B-29s landed at the field; in November 1944, the first B-29 missions were on their way to Japan.
- Ie Shima On 23 May 1945, the 805th boarded LSTs anchored in Tanapag Harbor off Saipan. On 29 May 1945, the battalion arrived off the coast of Okinawa, but was assigned runway construction on Ie Shima (Iejima), a small island off the northwest coast of Okinawa. The battalion came ashore on Ie Shima near the site of war correspondent Ernie Pyle's death. Pyle had been killed by a hidden Japanese machine gunner during the initial landings on Ie; at this point the site was only marked by an upturned rifle stuck in the mud with Pyle's helmet on it. It was later marked by a monument created by the 77th Infantry Division. As had been the case on Saipan, the 805th was assigned runway construction for B-29 operations. These runways were constructed primarily from native coral quarried from the island's interior. On 10 August 1945, the 805th completed runway "B" on Ie Shima Airfield; the runway was 7000 feet long and was the first all-American built runway in the Ryukyus Islands. On 19 August 1945, the Japanese surrender party arrived on Ie Shima in two Betty Bombers, each repainted white with green crosses in place of the rising sun. The Japanese transferred to a C-54 transport for the trip to Manila and a meeting with General MacArthur to review the terms of surrender. Members of the 805th and other units stationed on the island were allowed to line the sides of the runway as the Japanese delegation landed and departed, signaling the imminent end of World War II.

== See also ==
- 1892nd Engineer Aviation Battalion (United States)
