= Lattimore =

Lattimore can refer to:

- Lattimore, North Carolina

== People ==
- Cedrick Lattimore (born 1998), American football player
- DeDe Lattimore (born 1991), American football player
- Eleanor Larrabee Lattimore (1874–1966), American sociologist
- Florence L. Lattimore (1876–1956), American social worker
- Harlan Lattimore (1908–1980), singer with various jazz orchestras
- Kenny Lattimore (born 1970), American rhythm and blues singer
- Jonita Lattimore, American soprano
- Latasha Lattimore (born 2003), Canadian basketball player
- Marcus Lattimore (born 1991), American football player
- Marshon Lattimore (born 1996), American football player
- The children of David and Margaret Barnes Lattimore:
  - Owen Lattimore (1900–1989), American educator, author and target of Sen. Joseph McCarthy
  - Eleanor Frances Lattimore (1904–1986), American author and illustrator of children's books
  - Richmond Lattimore (1906–1984), American poet and translator of the Iliad and Odyssey
- Sir Lattimore Brown (1931–2011), American R&B singer
