= Lattimer =

Lattimer may refer to:

== People ==
- John K. Lattimer, urologist, researcher of the Lincoln and Kennedy assassinations
- Pete Lattimer, fictional character in the U.S. television series Warehouse 13

== Places ==
- Lattimer, Pennsylvania, United States, also known as "Lattimer Mines"
- Lattimer, West Virginia, United States

== Other uses ==
- Lattimer House, a historic house in Searcy, Arkansas, United States
- Lattimer massacre, an 1897 massacre of striking miners at the Lattimer mine, Pennsylvania

== See also ==
- Latimer (disambiguation)
