= Camp Stoneman =

US Army facility in Pittsburg, California

Coordinates: 38°00′33.5″N 121°53′11.65″W

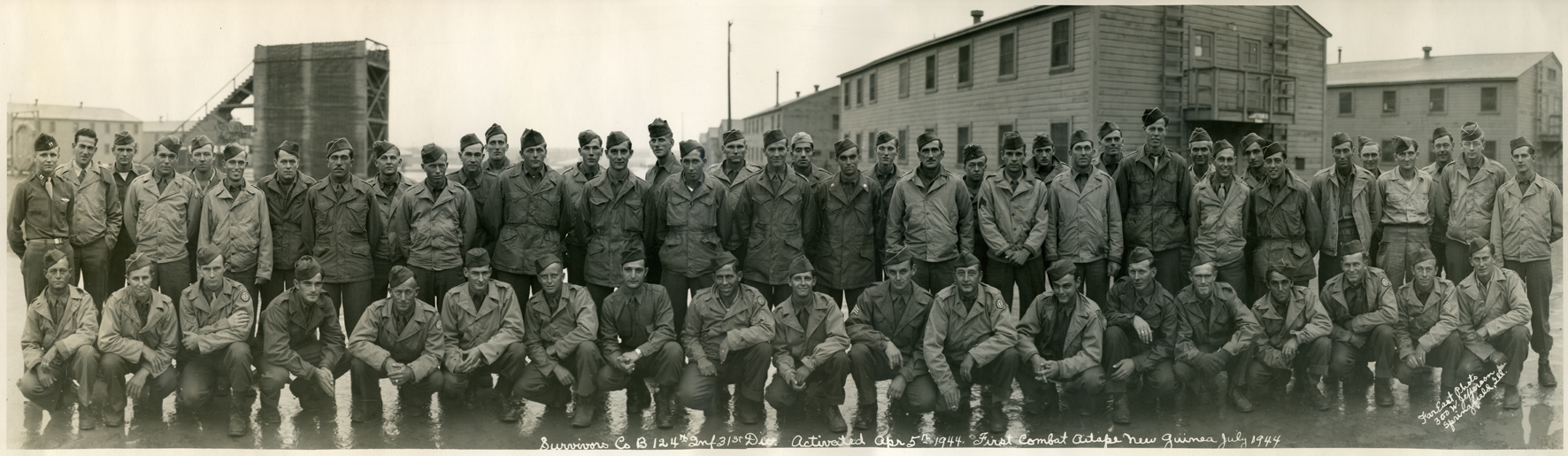
World War II combat survivors of Company B, 124th Infantry Regiment, 31st Infantry Division, at Camp Stoneman in December 1945

Camp Stoneman was a United States Army facility located in Pittsburg, California. It served as a major troop staging area for and under the command of the San Francisco Port of Embarkation (SFPOE). The camp operated during World War II and the Korean War.

The camp opened May 28, 1942 as a staging point for units deploying to the Pacific Ocean theater of World War II. The camp was named after George Stoneman, a cavalry commander during the American Civil War and Governor of California. It was decommissioned as a military post in 1954.

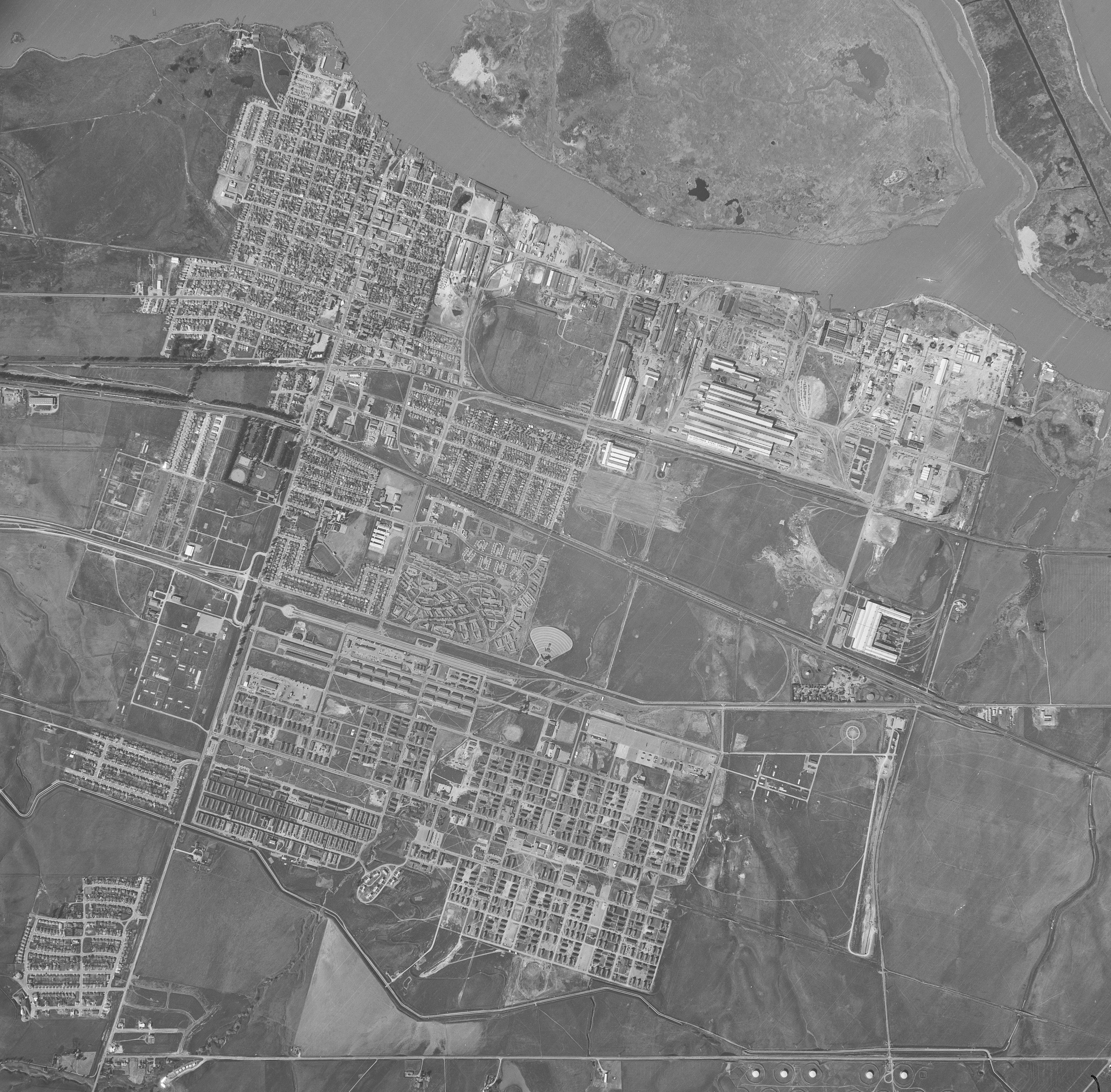
March 21, 1951, view of Pittsburg, California, with Camp Stoneman in the lower left, bordered by Railroad Ave., Contra Costa Canal, and California Street

The camp had a railroad track across the north side for receiving and shipping men. Late in the war the SFPOE experimented with embarking troops directly aboard a Liberty ship at the camp but that was not successful due to difficulties of large ship navigation to the camp. Next to the track, there were many buildings with loading docks, many of which were still there in 2017 along Bliss Avenue. There were seven barracks areas, each consisting of nine blocks (3 x 3) surrounding a mess hall.

In addition to being a staging area for troops in transit, the Pacific Coast Transportation Corps Officer Training School was located at the camp. The camp also housed prisoners of war with the Italian Service Unit of the 18th Italian Quartermaster Service Company, which was based at the camp.

== Units staged at Camp Stoneman ==
- 13th Troop Carrier Squadron, October 10 to November 1, 1942
- 2nd Infantry Division
- 172nd Infantry Regiment
- 4th Engineer Special Brigade
- 5th Cavalry Regiment World War II combat survivors of Company B, 124th Infantry Regiment, 31st Infantry Division, at Camp Stoneman in December 1945.
- 7th Cavalry Regiment
- 841st Engineer Aviation Battalion, September 12–25, 1943, departing for San Francisco and then to Sydney, Australia, September 26, 1943.
- 86th Infantry Division deployed from Camp Gruber, OK, staged at Camp Stoneman 14–21 August 1945 then departed SFPOE to the Philippines
- 805th Engineer Aviation Battalion
- 2nd Filipino Infantry Regiment

345th Bombardment Group (Air Apaches)

- 380 Bomb Group (5th Air Force), April 1943.

First Special Service Force, August 30 to September 4, 1943
