= Home Country (book) =

Book by Ernest Pyle

- First edition cover
- Author: Ernie Pyle
- Language: English
- Genre: Non-fiction
- Publisher: William Sloan Associates, Inc
- Publication date: 1947

Home Country is a collection of articles written by the columnist Ernie Pyle for Scripps-Howard newspapers between 1935 and 1940. It was compiled and published in 1947 by William Sloan Associates, Inc., after the author's death in 1945.

== Background ==
Pyle, tired of his desk editing job, badgered the Scripps-Howard syndicate for a road job. Based on some other articles that he wrote during a lengthy road trip, he was assigned to be a roving reporter.

He drove through the United States in his car and wrote columns about the people he met and the places he visited. The column became a huge success and was eventually being featured in more than 200 newspapers.

He eventually wrote columns from places as distant as the northern reaches of Alaska, Hawaii, Mexico, and South America. Pyle described life in conditions as disparate as the tropics of South America and the 1930s Great Plains Dust Bowl.

He wrote about prominent people, such as Walt Disney around 1935, and unknown everyday people, such as the woman who was on her way to commit suicide and ended up becoming a trapper in Alaska.

== Sources ==
- Copeland, Fayette (July 6, 1947). "Ernie Pyle's Earlier Tales Just as Good". The Daily Oklahoman. p. 71.
- Smith, Harry L. (June 15, 1947). "Story of Ernie Pyle's America". Richmond Times-Dispatch. p. 70.
