= Latymer (surname) =

Latymer is an uncommon English surname. It is an Anglo-Norman "surname of office" derived from latinier, or latimer, a speaker or writer of Latin, and since in Middle English leden meant "language", an interpreter. This occupation existed in medieval Europe when Latin was the common language of science, literature, law, and administration and thus the vehicle of records and transcripts.

From the Anglo-Norman, Latymer had the meanings one who forges new ideas, who is well-schooled and wise, an envoy and interpreter. Related names include Latimer, Lattemore and Lattimore.

Notable people with the name include:

- Edward Latymer (1557–1627), wealthy merchant and official in London
- William Latymer (1499–1583), English evangelical clergyman, Dean of Peterborough
- Baron Latymer (c. 1452–1502),
  - Crispin Money-Coutts, 9th Baron Latymer (born 1955)
  - Francis Money-Coutts, 5th Baron Latymer (1852–1923), British poet
  - Hugo Money-Coutts, 8th Baron Latymer (1926–2003)
  - Hugh Burdett Money-Coutts, 6th Baron Latymer (1876–1949)
  - Thomas Burdett Money-Coutts, 7th Baron Latymer (1901–1987)
  - George Neville, 1st Baron Latymer (died 1469)
  - John Neville, 3rd Baron Latymer (1493–1543)
  - Robert Willoughby, 9th Baron Latymer, English commander against Cornish rebels for Henry VII
