= Latimer Lake =

Lake in the state of Minnesota, United States

- Location within Minnesota
- Location: Todd County, Minnesota
- Coordinates: 45°55′15″N 94°51′2″W
- Type: lake

Latimer Lake is a lake in Todd County, in the U.S. state of Minnesota.

Latimer Lake was named for Alfred Eugene Latimer, a U.S. Army officer who was stationed in the area.

== See also ==
- List of lakes in Minnesota
