= Lattimer House =

Historic house in Arkansas, United States

- U.S. National Register of Historic Places
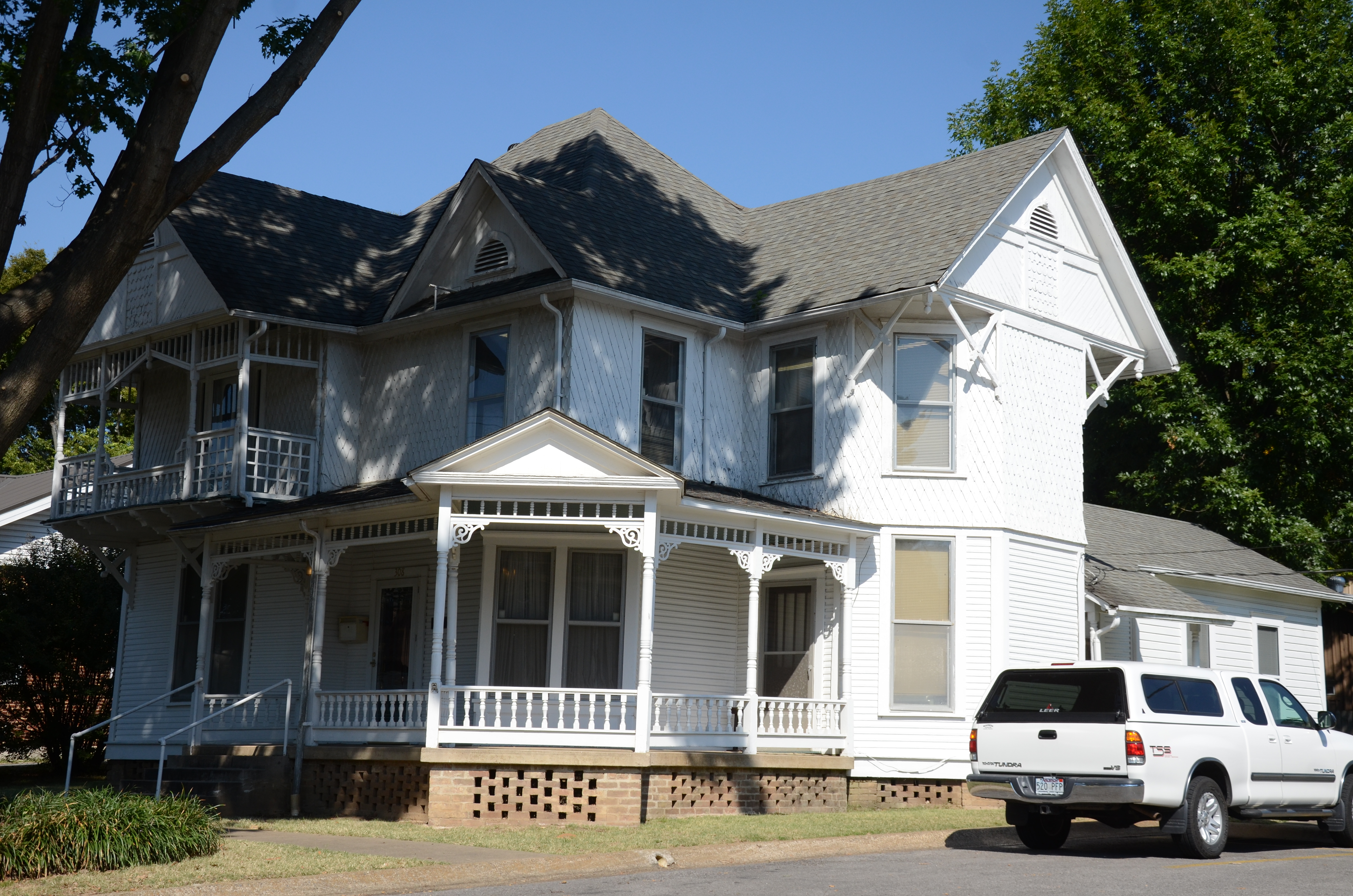

- Location within Arkansas Location within the United States
- Location: Jct. of Oak and Market Sts., Searcy, Arkansas
- Coordinates: 35°14′59″N 91°44′3″W
- Area: less than one acre
- Built: 1895
- Architectural style: Queen Anne
- MPS: White County MPS
- NRHP reference No.: 91001215
- Added to NRHP: September 5, 1991

The Lattimer House is a historic house at Oak and Market Streets in Searcy, Arkansas. It is a two-story wood-frame structure, with a hip roof, and a variety of projecting gables and porches typical of the Queen Anne style. The upper level is clad in diamond-cut wooden shingles. A wraparound porch on the ground floor has delicately turned posts and balusters, while a projecting second-story porch has a heavier Stick-style balustrade and cornice. The house was built about 1895, and is one of Searcy's finest examples of the Queen Anne style.

The house was listed on the National Register of Historic Places in 1991.

== See also ==
- National Register of Historic Places listings in White County, Arkansas
