= Larrimore =

Larrimore is a surname. Notable people with the surname include:

- Earle Larrimore (1899–1947), American actor
- Francine Larrimore (1898–1975), American actress
- Kareem Larrimore (born 1976), American football player
- Steve Larrimore (born 1963), Bahamian boxer

== See also ==
- Larimore (disambiguation)
