= Latimore =

Latimore is a surname. Notable people with the surname include:

- Latimore (musician) (Benny Latimore, 1939–2026), American R&B musician
- Jacob Latimore (born 1996), American R&B singer, SS7 Records
- Deandre Latimore (born 1985), American boxer
- Frank Latimore (1925–1998), American actor
- Jeremy Latimore (born 1986), Australian Rugby League player
- Thomas C. Latimore (1890–1941), United States Navy officer

== See also ==
- Latimore Township, Adams County, Pennsylvania
- Lattimore (disambiguation)
