= Ernie Pyle =

American war correspondent and writer

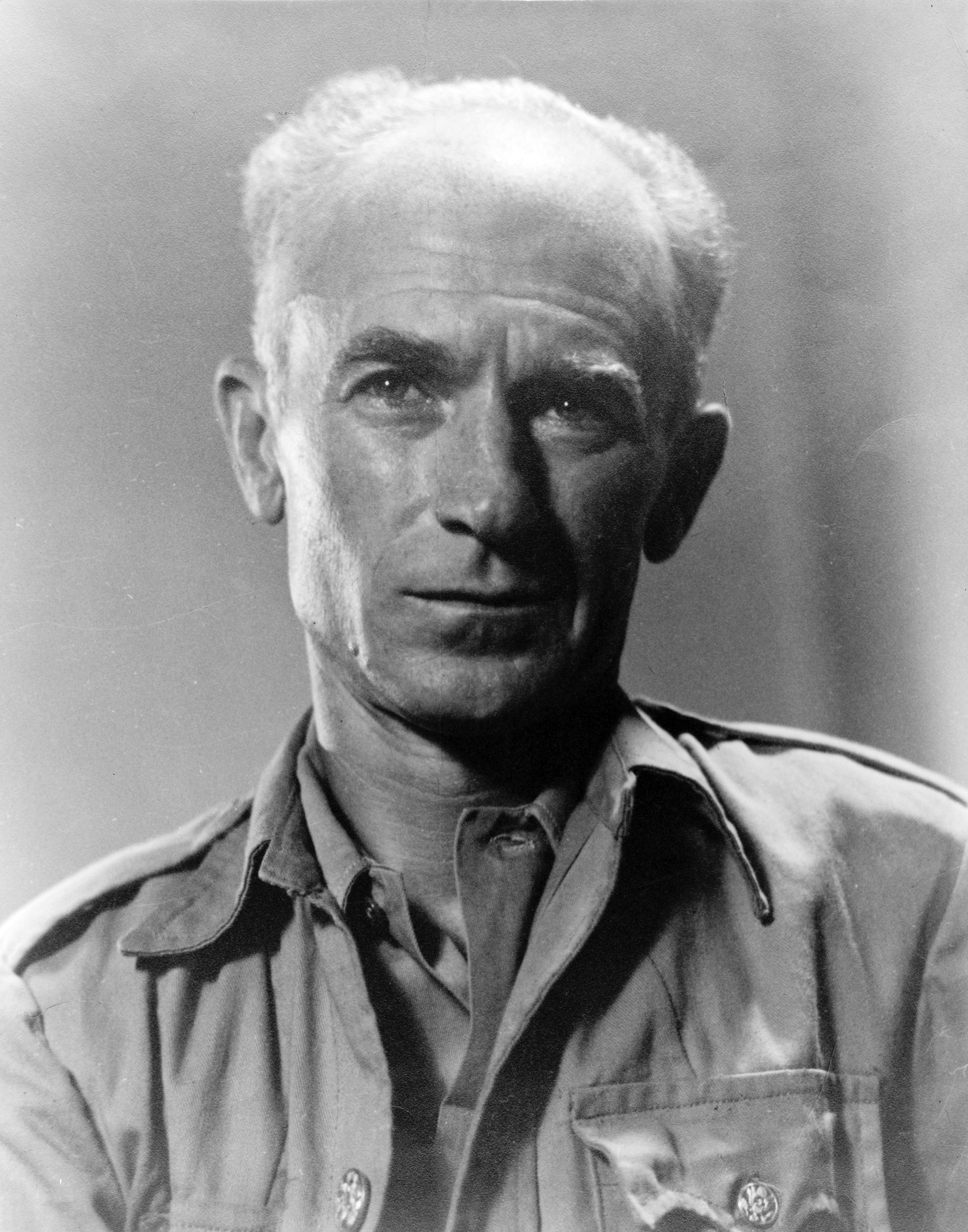
- Ernie Pyle in 1945
- Born: Ernest Taylor Pyle; August 3, 1900; Dana, Indiana, U.S.
- Died: April 18, 1945 (aged 44); Iejima, Okinawa Prefecture, Empire of Japan
- Cause of death: Killed in action
- Resting place: National Memorial Cemetery of the Pacific, Honolulu
- Occupation: Journalist
- Spouse: Geraldine Siebolds (m. 1925)

Ernest Taylor Pyle (August 3, 1900 – April 18, 1945) was an American journalist and war correspondent who is best known for his stories about ordinary American soldiers during World War II. Pyle is also notable for the columns he wrote as a roving human-interest reporter from 1935 through 1941 for the Scripps-Howard newspaper syndicate that earned him wide acclaim for his simple accounts of ordinary people across North America. When the United States entered World War II, he lent the same distinctive, folksy style of his human-interest stories to his wartime reports from the European theater (1942–44) and Pacific theater (1945). Pyle won the Pulitzer Prize in 1944 for his newspaper accounts of "dogface" infantry soldiers from a first-person perspective. He was killed by enemy fire on Iejima (then known as Ie Shima) during the Battle of Okinawa.

At the time of his death in 1945, Pyle was among the best-known American war correspondents. His syndicated column was published in 400 daily and 300 weekly newspapers nationwide. President Harry Truman said of Pyle, "No man in this war has so well told the story of the American fighting man as American fighting men wanted it told. He deserves the gratitude of all his countrymen."

== Early life and education ==
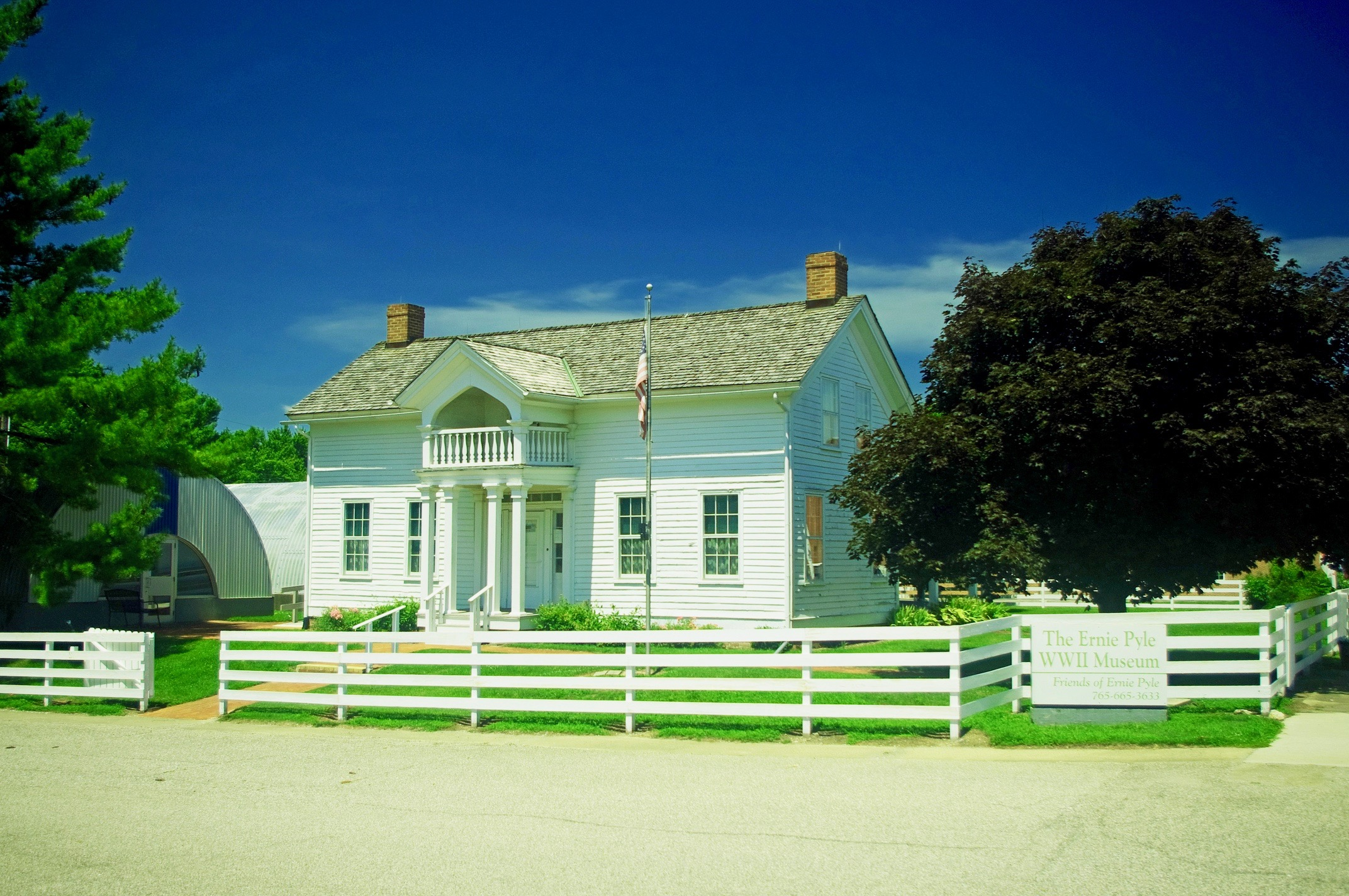
Ernie Pyle birthplace in Dana, Indiana

Ernest "Ernie" Taylor Pyle was born on August 3, 1900, on the Sam Elder farm near Dana, Indiana, in rural Vermillion County. His parents were Maria (Taylor) and William Clyde Pyle. At the time of Pyle's birth his father was a tenant farmer on the Elder property. Neither of Pyle's parents attended school beyond the eighth grade.

Pyle, an only child, disliked farming and pursued a more adventurous life. After graduating from a local high school in Bono, he enlisted in the U.S. Naval Reserve during World War I. Pyle began his training at the University of Illinois Urbana-Champaign, but the war ended before he could be transferred to the Great Lakes Naval Training Station for additional training.

Pyle enrolled at Indiana University in 1919, aspiring to become a journalist. However, Indiana University did not offer a degree in journalism at that time, so Pyle majored in economics and took as many journalism courses as he could. Pyle began studying journalism in his sophomore year, the same year he joined Sigma Alpha Epsilon fraternity and began working on the Indiana Daily Student, the student-written newspaper. During his junior year Pyle became the newspaper's city editor and its news editor; he also worked on the Arbutus, the campus yearbook, although he did not enjoy the desk-bound work. Pyle's simple, storytelling writing style, which he developed while a student at IU, later became his trademark style as a professional journalist and earned him millions of readers as a columnist for Scripps-Howard newspaper syndicate.

In March 1922, during his junior year at Indiana University, Pyle and three of his fraternity brothers dropped out of school for a semester to follow the Indiana University baseball team on a trip to Japan. Pyle and his fraternity brothers found work aboard the S.S. Keystone State. During its voyage across the Pacific Ocean, the ship docked at ports such as Shanghai, Hong Kong, and Manila, as well as in Japan before returning trip to the United States. Pyle's interest in traveling and exploring the world continued in his later years as a reporter.

After his trip across the Pacific, Pyle returned to Indiana University Bloomington, where he was named editor-in-chief of the Indiana Summer Student, the summer edition of the campus newspaper. During his senior year at Indiana University, Pyle continued his work at the Daily Student and the Arbutus. He also joined Sigma Delta Chi, the journalism fraternity, and was active in other campus clubs. In addition, Pyle was selected as a senior manager of IU's football team, making him a letterman along with the other members of the team in 1922.

Pyle left school in January 1923 with only a semester remaining and without graduating from IU. He took a job as a newspaper reporter for the Daily Herald in La Porte, Indiana, earning $25 a week. Pyle worked at the Daily Herald for three months before moving to Washington, D.C., to join the staff of The Washington Daily News.

== Personal life ==
Pyle met his future wife, Geraldine Elizabeth "Jerry" Siebolds (August 23, 1899 – November 23, 1945), a native of Minnesota, at a Halloween party in Washington, D.C., in 1923. They married in July 1925. In the early years of their marriage the couple traveled the country together. In Pyle's newspaper columns describing their trips, he often referred to her as "That Girl who rides with me." In June 1940, Pyle purchased property about 3 miles (4.8 km) from downtown Albuquerque, New Mexico, and had a modest, 1,145-square-foot (106.4 m^{2}) home built on the site. The residence served as the couple's home base in the United States for the remainder of their lives.

Ernie and Jerry Pyle had a tempestuous relationship. He often complained of being ill, was a "heavy abuser of alcohol at times," and suffered from bouts of depression, later made worse from the stress of his work as a war correspondent during World War II. His wife suffered from alcoholism and periods of mental illness (depression or bipolar disorder). She also made several suicide attempts. Although the couple divorced on April 14, 1942, they remarried by proxy in March 1943, while Pyle was covering the war in North Africa. They did not have any children. Newspapers reported that Jerry Pyle "took the news [of her husband's death] bravely," but her health declined rapidly in the months following his death on April 18, 1945, while he was covering operations of American troops on Ie Shima. Jerry Pyle died from complications of influenza at Albuquerque, New Mexico, on November 23, 1945.

== Career ==
=== Staff reporter and aviation columnist ===
In 1923, Pyle moved to Washington, D.C., to join the staff as a reporter for the Washington Daily News, a new Scripps-Howard tabloid newspaper, and soon became a copy editor as well. Pyle was paid $30 a week for his services, beginning a career with Scripps-Howard that would continue for the remainder of his life. When Pyle joined the Daily News all the editors were young, including editor-in-chief John M. Gleissner, Lee G. Miller (who became a lifelong friend of Pyle) Charles M. Egan, Willis "June" Thornton Jr., and Paul McCrea.

By 1926, Pyle and his wife, Geraldine "Jerry", had quit their jobs. In ten weeks the couple traveled more than 9,000 miles across the United States in a Ford Model T roadster. After briefly working in New York City for the Evening World and the New York Post, Pyle returned to the Daily News in December 1927 to begin work on one of the country's first and its best-known aviation column, which he wrote for four years. Pyle's column appeared in syndication for the Scripps-Howard newspapers from 1928 to 1932. Although he never became an aircraft pilot, Pyle flew about 100,000 miles (160,000 km) as a passenger. As Amelia Earhart later said, "Any aviator who didn't know Pyle was a nobody."

=== Human-interest and columnist ===
In 1932, at the age of thirty-one, Pyle was named managing editor at the Daily News, serving in the position for three years before taking on a new writing assignment. In December 1934 Pyle took an extended vacation in the western United States to recuperate from a severe bout of influenza. Upon his return to Washington, D.C., and while he filled in for the paper's vacationing syndicated columnist Heywood Broun, Pyle wrote a series of eleven articles about his trip and the people he had met. The series proved popular with both readers and colleagues. G.B. ("Deac") Parker, editor-in-chief of the Scripps-Howard newspaper chain, said he had found in Pyle's vacation articles "a sort of Mark Twain quality and they knocked my eyes right out".

In 1935, Pyle left his position as managing editor at the Daily News to write his own national column as a roving reporter of human-interest stories for the Scripps-Howard newspaper syndicate. Over the next six years, from 1935 until early 1942, Pyle and his wife, Jerry, whom Pyle identified in his columns as "That Girl who rides with me," traveled the United States, Canada, and Mexico, as well as Central and South America, writing about the interesting places he saw and people he met. Pyle's column, published under the title of the "Hoosier Vagabond," appeared six days a week in Scripps-Howard newspapers. The articles became popular with readers, earning Pyle national recognition in the years preceding his even bigger fame as a war correspondent during World War II. Selected columns of Pyle's human interest stories were later compiled in Home Country (1947), published posthumously.

Despite his growing popularity, Pyle lacked confidence and was perpetually dissatisfied with his writing; however, he was pleased when others recognized the quality of his work. Pyle's aviation and travel reports laid the groundwork for his life as a war correspondent. Pyle continued his daily travel column until 1942, but by that time he was also writing about American soldiers serving in World War II.

=== World War II correspondent ===
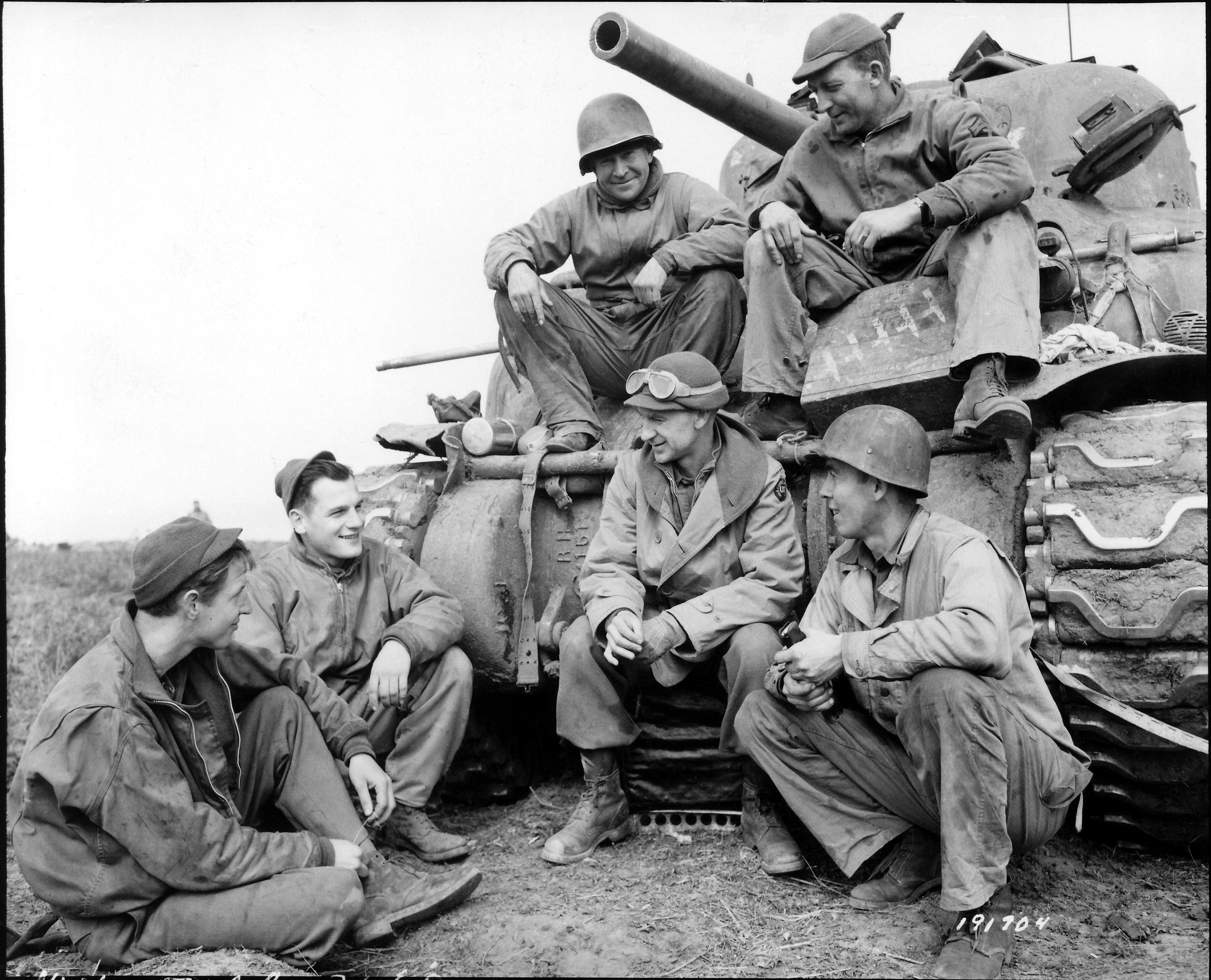
Pyle (center, with goggles) with a crew from the US Army's 191st Tank Battalion at the Anzio beachhead in 1944

Pyle initially went to London in 1940 to cover the Battle of Britain, but returned to Europe in 1942 as a war correspondent for Scripps-Howard newspapers. Beginning in North Africa in late 1942, Pyle spent time with the U.S. military during the North African Campaign, the Italian campaign, and the Normandy landings. He returned to the United States in September 1944, spending several weeks recuperating from combat stress before reluctantly agreeing to travel to the Asiatic-Pacific Theater in January 1945. Pyle was covering the invasion of Okinawa when he was killed in April 1945.

==== European theater ====
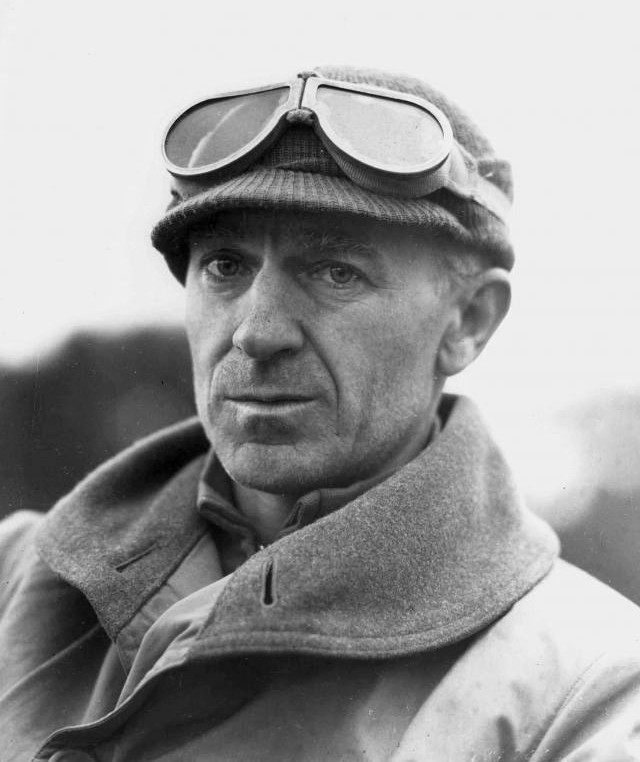
Pyle at Anzio, Italy, 1944

Pyle volunteered to go to London in December 1940 to cover the Battle of Britain. He witnessed the German firebombing of the city and reported on the growing conflict in Europe. His recollections of his experiences from this period were published in his book, Ernie Pyle in England (1941). After returning to the United States in March 1941 and taking a three-month leave of absence from work to care for his wife, Pyle made a second trip to Great Britain in June 1942, when he accepted an assignment to become a war correspondent for Scripps-Howard newspapers. Pyle's wartime columns usually described the war from the common man's perspective as he rotated among the various branches of the U.S. military and reported from the front lines. Pyle joined American troops in North Africa and Europe (1942–44), and the Asiatic-Pacific Theater (1945). Collections of Pyle's newspaper columns from the campaigns he covered in the European theater are included in Here is Your War (1943) and Brave Men (1944).

In his reports of the North African Campaign in late 1942 and early 1943, Pyle told stories of his early wartime experiences, which made interesting reading for Americans in the United States. Through his work, Pyle became friends of the enlisted men and officers, as well as those in leadership roles such as Generals Omar Bradley and Dwight D. Eisenhower. Pyle wrote that he was especially fond of the infantry "because they are the underdogs".

Pyle lived among the U.S. servicemen and was free to interview anyone he wanted. As a noncombatant Pyle could also leave the front when he wanted. He interrupted his reporting in September 1943 and in September 1944 to return home to recuperate from the stresses of combat and care for his wife when she was ill.

Reinforcing his status as the dogface G.I.'s best friend, Pyle wrote a column from Italy in 1944 proposing that soldiers in combat should get "fight pay," just as airmen received "flight pay". In May 1944 the U.S. Congress passed a law that became known as the Ernie Pyle bill. It authorized 50 percent extra pay for combat service. Pyle's most famous column, "The Death of Captain Waskow," written in Italy in December 1943, was published on January 10, 1944, when Allied forces were fighting at the Anzio beachhead in Italy. The notable story also marked the peak of Pyle's writing career.

After the North African and Italian campaigns, Pyle left Italy in April 1944, relocating to England to cover preparations for the Allied landing at Normandy. Pyle was among the twenty-eight war correspondents chosen to accompany U.S. troops during the initial invasion in June 1944. He landed with American troops at Omaha Beach aboard a LST. On D-Day Pyle wrote:

The best way I can describe this vast armada and the frantic urgency of the traffic is to suggest that you visualize New York city on its busiest day of the year and then just enlarge that scene until it takes in all the ocean the human eye can reach clear around the horizon and over the horizon. There are dozens of times that many.

In July 1944, Pyle was nearly caught in the accidental bombing by the U.S. Army Air Forces at the onset of Operation Cobra near Saint-Lô in Normandy. A month after witnessing the liberation of Paris in August 1944, Pyle publicly apologized to his readers in a column on September 5, 1944, stating that "my spirit is wobbly and my mind is confused" and he said that if he "heard one more shot or saw one more dead man, I would go off my nut". He later said he had "lost track of the point of the war" and that another two weeks of coverage would have seen him hospitalized with "war neurosis". An exhausted Pyle wrote that he hoped that a rest at his home in New Mexico would restore his vigor to go "warhorsing around the Pacific".

==== Pacific theater ====
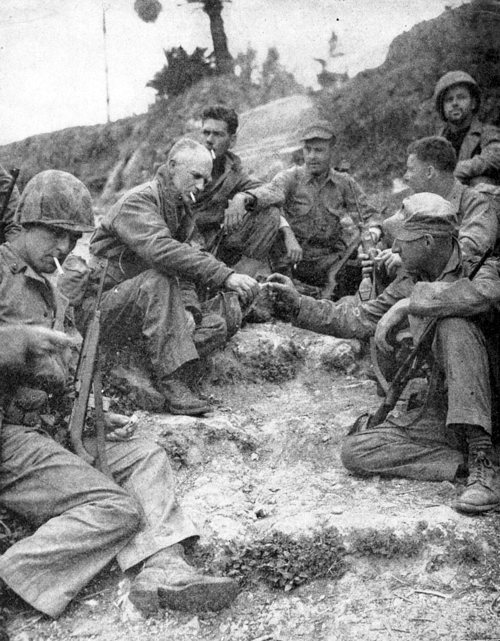
Pyle shares a cigarette with Marines on Okinawa

Pyle reluctantly headed for the Pacific theater in January 1945 for what became his final writing assignment. While covering the U.S. Navy and Marine forces in the Pacific, Pyle challenged the Navy's policy forbidding the use of the names of sailors in reporting the war. He won a partial but unsatisfying victory when the ban was lifted exclusively for him. Pyle travelled on board the aircraft carrier USS Cabot. He thought the naval crew had an easier life than the infantry in Europe, and wrote several unflattering portraits of the Navy. In response, fellow correspondents, newspaper editorialists and G.I.s criticized Pyle (who was a former member of the U.S. Naval Reserve) for his negative coverage of the Navy in his columns and for underestimating the difficulties of naval warfare in the Pacific. Pyle conceded that his heart was with the servicemen in Europe, but he persevered. After traveling to Guam and resuming his writing, Pyle went on to report on naval action during the Battle of Okinawa, the largest amphibious assault in the Pacific theater during World War II.

== Death ==
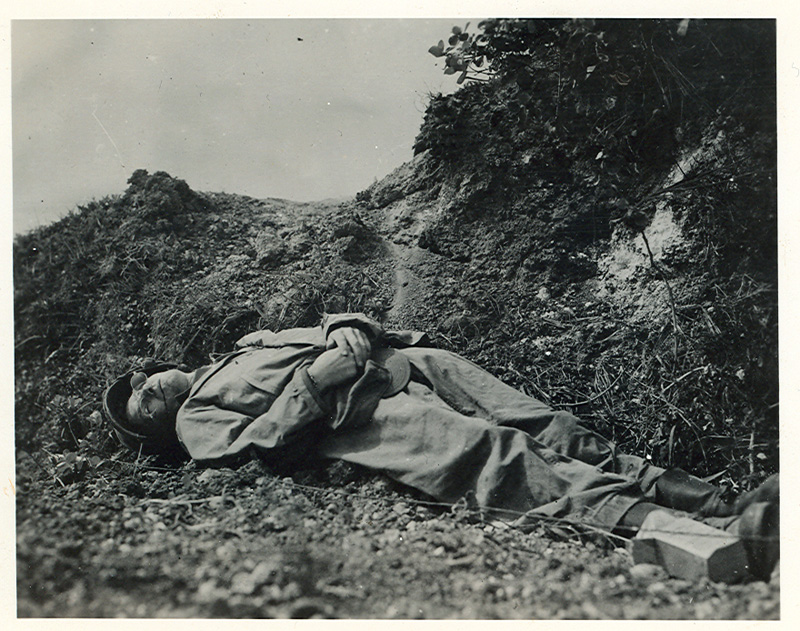
Pyle shortly after being killed by enemy gunfire

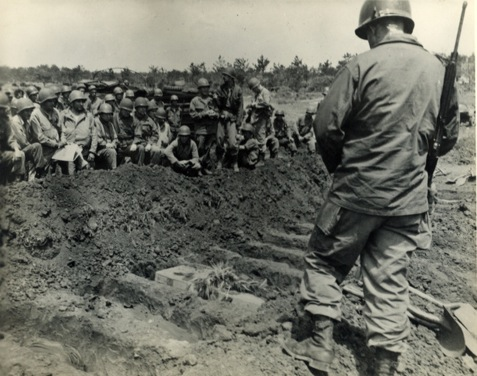
Ernie Pyle funeral

On more than one occasion, Pyle was noted for having premonitions of his own death. Before landing he wrote letters to his friend Paige Cavanaugh, as well as playwright Robert E. Sherwood, predicting that he might not survive the war.

On April 17, 1945, Pyle came ashore with the U.S. Army's 305th Infantry Regiment, 77th Infantry Division, on Ie Shima (now known as Iejima), a small island northwest of Okinawa that Allied forces had captured, but had not yet cleared of enemy soldiers. The following day, after local enemy opposition had supposedly been neutralized, Pyle was traveling by jeep with Lieutenant Colonel Joseph B. Coolidge, the commanding officer of the 305th and three additional officers toward Coolidge's new command post when the vehicle came under fire from a Japanese machine gun. The men immediately took cover in a nearby ditch. "A little later Pyle and I raised up to look around," Coolidge reported. "Another burst hit the road over our heads ... I looked at Ernie and saw he had been hit." A machine-gun bullet had entered Pyle's left temple just under his helmet, killing him instantly.

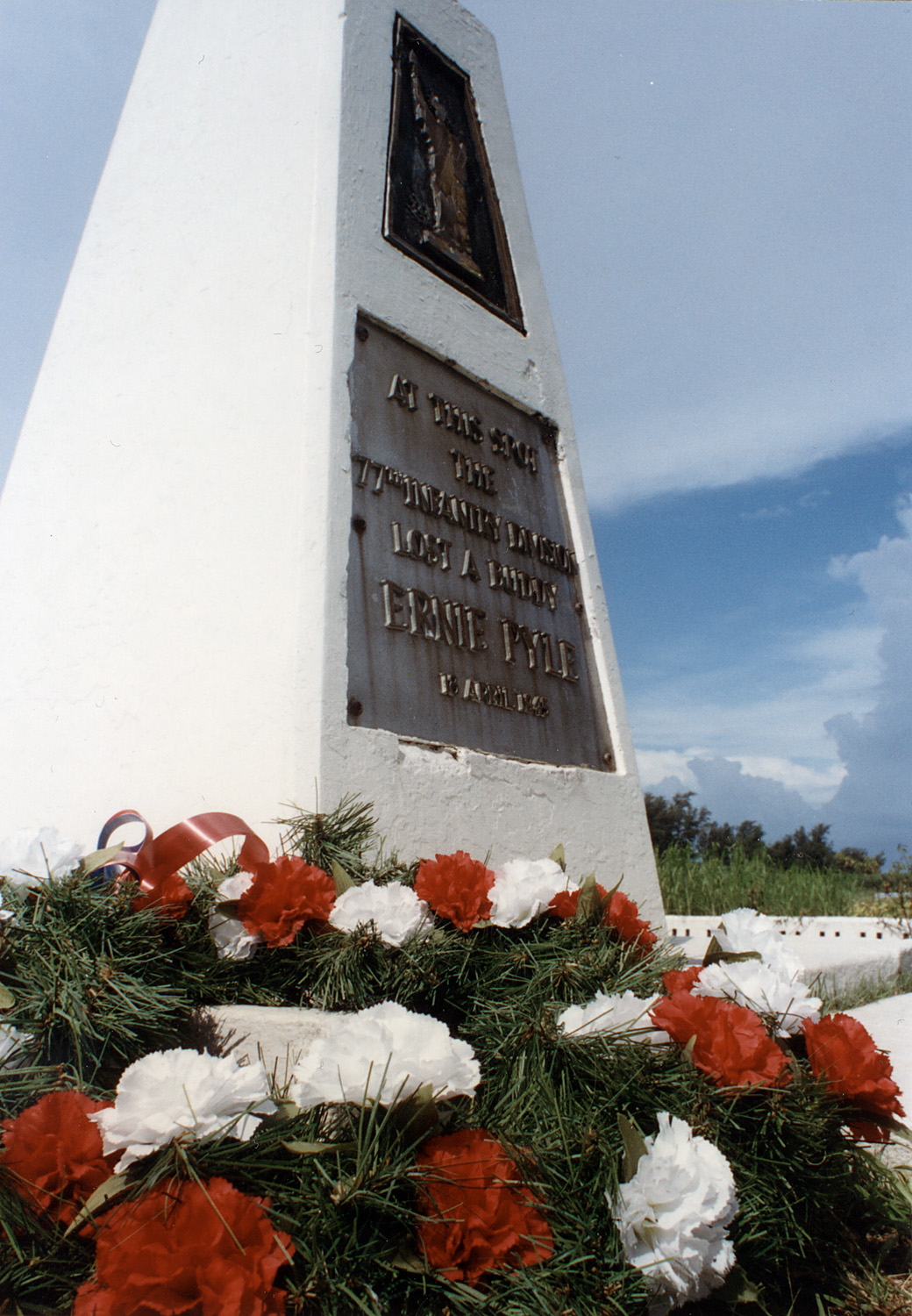
The Ernie Pyle Memorial on Iejima, Japan

Pyle was buried wearing his helmet, among other battle casualties on Ie Shima, between an infantry private and a combat engineer. In tribute to their friend, the men of the 77th Infantry Division erected a monument that still stands at the site of his death. Its inscription reads: "At this spot the 77th Infantry Division lost a buddy, Ernie Pyle, 18 April 1945." Echoing the sentiment of the men serving in the Pacific theater, General Eisenhower said: "The GIs in Europe––and that means all of us––have lost one of our best and most understanding friends."

Former First Lady Eleanor Roosevelt, who frequently quoted Pyle's war dispatches in her newspaper column, My Day, paid tribute to him in her column the day after his death: "I shall never forget how much I enjoyed meeting him here in the White House last year," she wrote, "and how much I admired this frail and modest man who could endure hardships because he loved his job and our men." President Harry S. Truman, who had been in office for less than a week following the death of Franklin Roosevelt on April 12, also paid tribute to Pyle: "No man in this war has so well told the story of the American fighting man as American fighting men wanted it told. He deserves the gratitude of all his countrymen."

Pyle's friend, war correspondent Frederick C. Painton, died of a heart attack on Guam on March 31, 1945. The two had met, and sometimes traveled together, covering the North African and Italian campaigns in 1943, after which Painton profiled Pyle for the Saturday Evening Post. When Pyle heard the news of Painton's death, he immediately wrote a tribute. Pyle's death followed within days, thus his last published column (April 28) paid homage to a fellow correspondent.

After the war, Pyle's remains were moved to a U.S. military cemetery on Okinawa. In 1949, his remains were some of the first to be interred at the National Memorial Cemetery of the Pacific in Honolulu, Oahu, Hawaii.

== Writing style ==
Pyle's signature storytelling style was developed at IU and during his early years as a human-interest reporter. As a war correspondent he generally wrote from the perspective of the common soldier, explaining how the war affected the men instead of recounting troop movements or the activities of generals. His descriptions of, or reactions to, an event in simple, informal stories are what set his writing apart and made him famous during the war.

Fellow journalists praised Pyle's writing. Walter Morrow, editor of the Rocky Mountain News, claimed that Pyle's columns from his travels across the United States in the 1930s were "the most widely read thing in the paper." During World War II Pyle continued to write about his experiences from the perspective of what he called "the worm's-eye view." In addition to publication of his columns in newspapers in the United States, Pyle's writing was the only writing from a civilian correspondent to be regularly published in the U.S. armed forces newspaper, Stars and Stripes.

Pyle's "everyman" approach to his wartime reporting earned him the Pulitzer Prize for journalism in 1944.

== Popularity ==
Pyle was well known and popular among the American military. According to Sergeant Mack Morris, whose essay appeared in the U.S. army's weekly newspaper, Yank: "The secret of Ernie's tremendous success and popularity, if there is any secret about it, is his ability to report a war on a personal plane." Artist George Biddle wrote of how a battalion commander told him that Pyle was a poor writer, but was very popular because "he writes about and writes to the great, anonymous American average. They ... are thirsty for recognition and publicity".

Pyle's newspaper columns were popular in the United States with readers in a wide range of ages from older readers to high school and college students. In November 1942 Pyle's columns were distributed to 42 newspapers, but the number had increased to 122 newspapers by April 1943. When he returned to the United States for a break during the war, reporters and photographers made increasing demands for his time. In 1943 Pyle also gave interviews on radio programs to help sell war bonds. At the time of Pyle's death his columns appeared in 400 daily and 300 weekly newspapers.

== Legacy ==
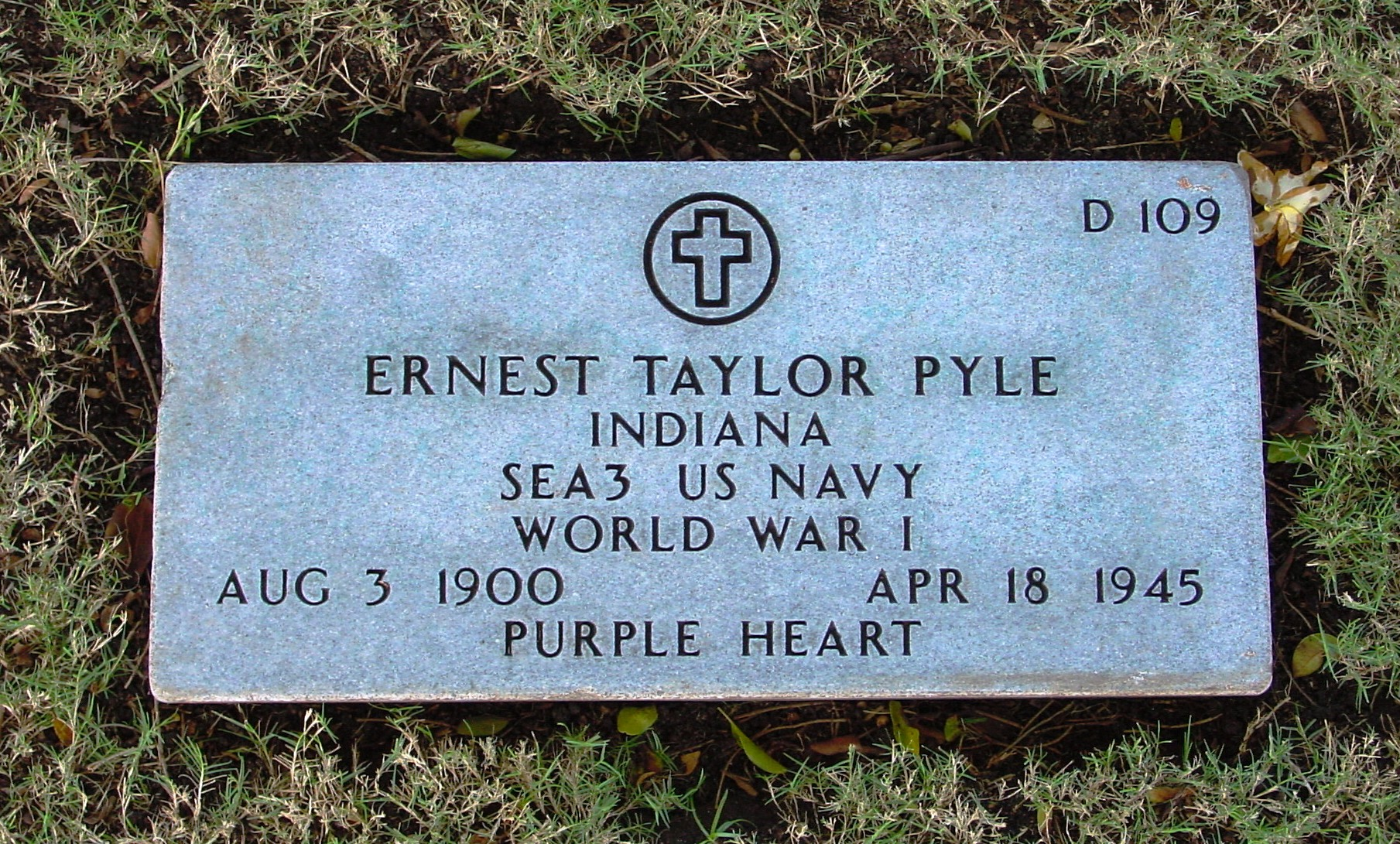
Pyle's headstone at Memorial Cemetery in Honolulu

Pyle is described as "the pre-eminent war correspondent of his era," who achieved worldwide fame and readership for his World War II battlefield reports that were published from 1942 to 1945. Present-day war correspondents, World War II veterans, and historians still recognize Pyle's World War II dispatches as "the standard to which every other war correspondent should strive to emulate." As Life magazine once described Pyle and his work: "He now occupies a place in American journalistic letters which no other correspondent of this war has achieved. His smooth, friendly prose succeeded in bridging a gap between soldier and civilian where written words usually fail."

Pyle is best remembered for his World War II newspaper reports of the firsthand experiences of ordinary Americans, especially the G.I.s serving in the U.S. Armed Forces in Europe in particular. His legacy also lies in the stories of soldiers who would otherwise be unknown. "The Death of Captain Waskow," published in January 1944, is considered Pyle's most famous column. In describing the soldiers he had met, Pyle remarked:

Their life consisted wholly and solely of war, for they were and always had been front-line infantrymen. They survived because the fates were kind to them, certainly – but also because they had become hard and immensely wise in animal-like ways of self-preservation.

In addition to his writing, Pyle's legacy includes the Ernie Pyle bill, whose content he proposed in one of his columns in early 1944. Congress passed formal legislation in May 1944 to provide American soldiers with a 50 percent increase in pay for their combat service. The U.S. Army also adopted Pyle's suggestion of providing overseas service bars on uniforms to designate six months of overseas service.

Pyle's papers and other archival materials related to his life and work are held at the Lilly Library, Indiana University Bloomington; the Ernie Pyle World War II Museum, Dana, Indiana; the Indiana State Museum; and the Wisconsin State Historical Society. The Indiana Historical Society acquired Ernie and Jerry Pyle's personal library from IU Bloomington's School of Journalism in 2005 and moved the collection to its headquarters in Indianapolis.

Ernie Pyle Hall is the former site of the Indiana University School of Journalism prior to its being folded into The Media School. The building now houses the Office of Admissions Welcome Center and the Walter Center for Career achievement. A statue of Pyle was erected outside of Franklin Hall which is home to The Media School and the Department of Journalism.

== Honors and awards ==
- A two-time recipient of the National Headliners Club Award (1943 and 1944).
- Awarded the Pulitzer Prize for his war correspondence in 1944.
- Featured on the cover of Time magazine, July 17, 1944.
- Recipient of the Raymond Clapper Memorial Award in 1944 from the journalism fraternity Sigma Delta Chi (the present-day Society of Professional Journalists).
- The Sons of Indiana in New York City named Pyle the Hoosier of the Year in 1944.
- Awarded an honorary doctorate from the University of New Mexico.
- Awarded an honorary Doctor of Humane Letters degree from Indiana University on November 13, 1944.
- The U.S. government posthumously awarded Pyle a Medal for Merit in July 1945.
- In 1983, Pyle was posthumously awarded the Purple Heart–a rare honor for a civilian—by the 77th Division's successor unit, the 77th Army Reserve Command.
- Recipient, posthumously, of the American Legion's Distinguished Service Medal in 1945.

== Tributes ==
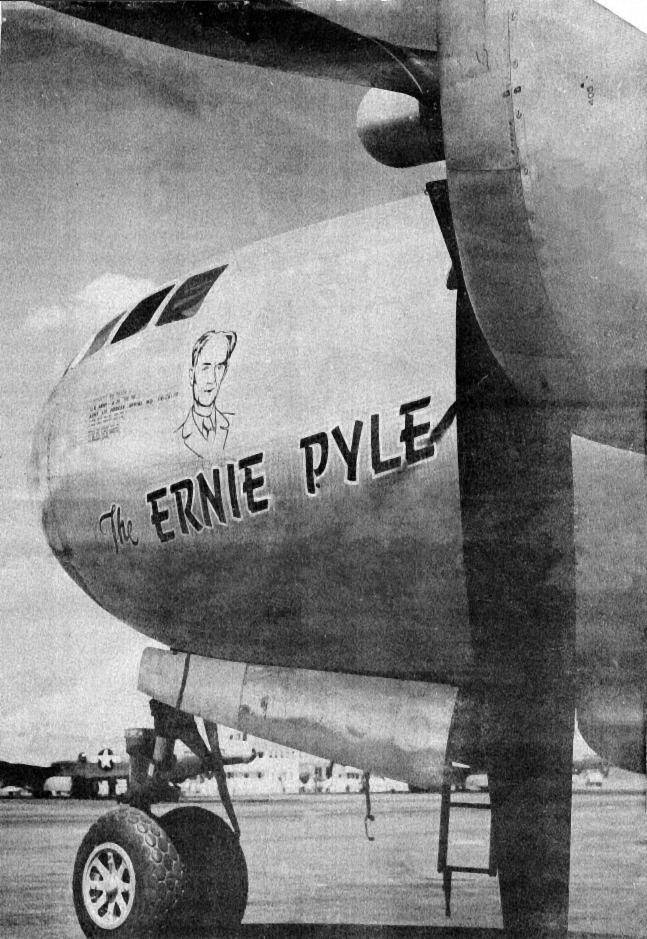
The Ernie Pyle Boeing B-29

- The employees of Boeing-Wichita, through the 7th War Loan Drive, paid for and built a Boeing B-29 Superfortress named the "Ernie Pyle," which was dedicated on May 1, 1945. Initially assigned to the Second Air Force at Kearney Air Force Base, the B-29 named in Pyle's honor, Serial Number 44-70118, was sent to the Twentieth Air Force, Pacific Theater of Operations, on May 27, 1945. The plane was ferried to the Pacific theater by a crew under the command of Lieutenants Howard F. Lippincott and Robert H. Silver. The nose art was removed when the aircraft reached its intended operations base in the Pacific because the base commander thought it would become a prime target of the Japanese. The "Ernie Pyle" survived the war and was returned to the United States on October 22, 1945. It was stored at Pyote AAF, Texas, and disposed of as surplus on March 25, 1953.
- Shortly after his death, on Friday, April 27, 1945, the United States Maritime Commission announced (PR 2247) that a troop ship would be named after him SS Ernie Pyle. It was launched by Babette Johnson, his niece, in June 1945. It was used to transport refugees from Europe.
- During the American occupation of Japan, between 1945 and 1955, the Tokyo Takarazuka Theater in downtown Tokyo was renamed the Ernie Pyle Theater, a site that was popular with many American G.I.s.
- Scripps-Howard Newspapers established the Ernie Pyle Memorial Fund in 1953 to support the Ernie Pyle Award. Beginning in 1953, the award is given annually to reporters who "most nearly exemplify the style and craftsmanship for which Ernie Pyle was known". The award is now known as the Excellence in Human Interest Storytelling Award (Honoring Ernie Pyle), and is part of the annual Scripps Howard Awards.
- The Indiana University board of trustees voted in 1954 to officially name the building that housed the IU School of Journalism on the Bloomington campus as Ernie Pyle Hall. The previous year, Sigma Delta Chi had placed a marker honoring Pyle at the east end of the building. Ernie Pyle Hall is the present-day home of the Office of Admissions Welcome Center and the College of Arts and Sciences Center for Career Achievement.
- In 1970, Pyle's nephew, Bruce L. Johnson, placed a memorial plaque at Pyle's burial site at the National Memorial Cemetery of the Pacific, Punchbowl Crater, Honolulu, Oahu, Hawaii.
- On May 7, 1971, the U.S. Postal Service issued a 16-cent postage stamp in Pyle's honor.
- Indiana University's annual Ernie Pyle Scholars Honors Program was established in 2006 for incoming freshman honors students majoring in journalism.
- In 2014, sculptor Tuck Langland 's bronze statue of Pyle was erected in front of Franklin Hall on the Indiana University Bloomington campus. (The Indiana University School of Journalism, the department of Telecommunications, and the Department of Communication and Culture also merged in 2014 to establish the Indiana University Media School, which is housed in Franklin Hall)
- The first annual Ernie Pyle Legacy Foundation Scholarship of $1,000 was awarded in 2017 to a University of New Mexico journalism student.
- August 3, 2018, the inaugural National Ernie Pyle Day, was the result of a Congressional resolution drafted by the U.S. senators from Indiana, Joe Donnelly and Todd Young. Indiana governor Eric Holcomb also proclaimed August 3, 2018, as Ernie Pyle Day in Indiana.

== Pyle historic sites ==
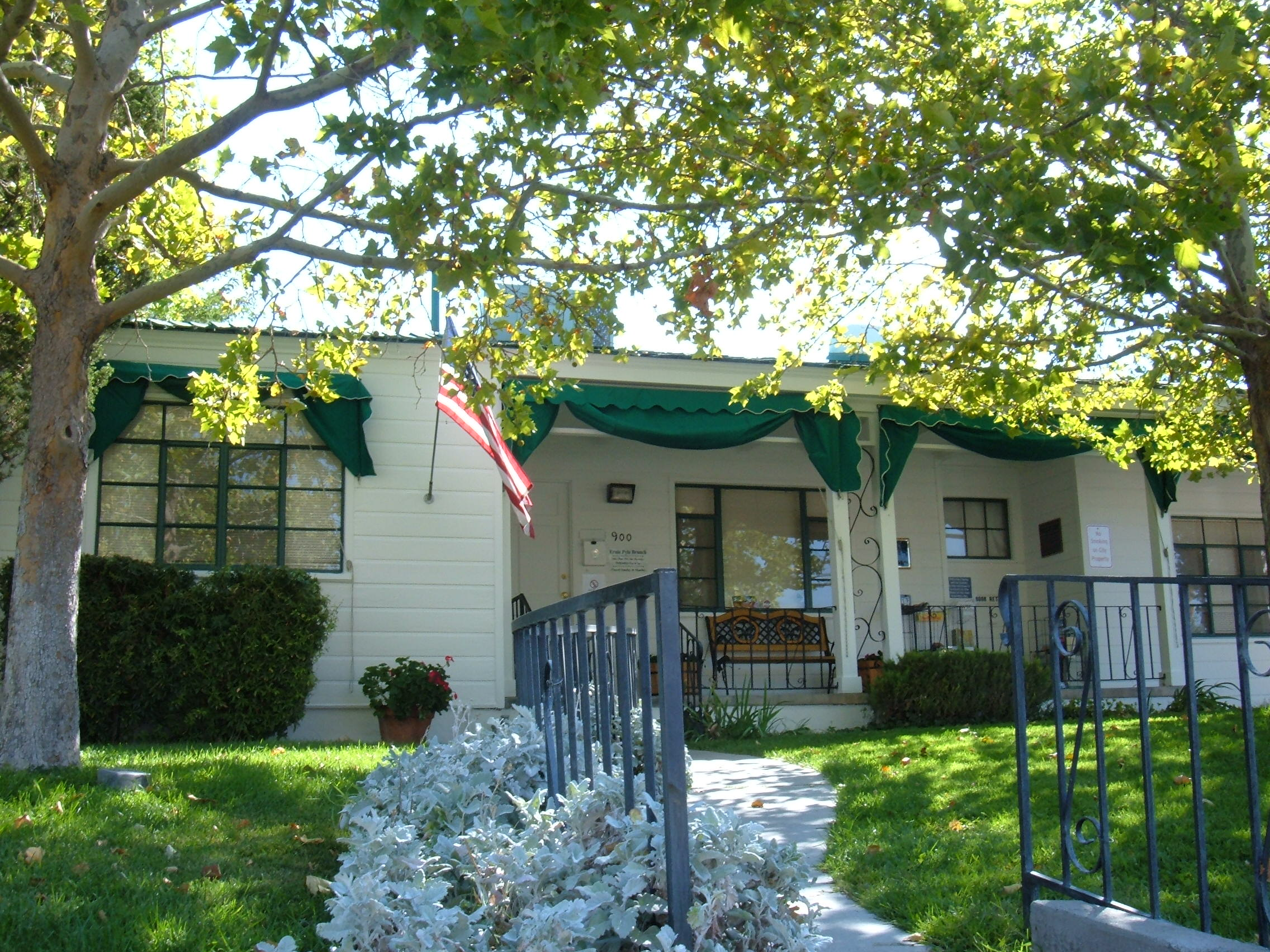
The Ernie Pyle Library in Albuquerque

- In 1947, the Albuquerque City Council accepted Pyle's last home in Albuquerque, New Mexico, as a memorial to the late war correspondent. Since 1948 the former residence, known as the Ernie Pyle Library, has served as the first branch of the Albuquerque/Bernalillo County Library System. The library branch houses a small collection of adult and children's books, as well as Pyle memorabilia and archives. The Ernie Pyle House/Library was designated as a National Historic Landmark on September 20, 2006.
- The Ernie Pyle World War II Museum (Pyle's restored birthplace) includes a farmhouse that was moved from its original location to Dana, Indiana. The museum, which is open to the public, became a state historic site in July 1976; however, it is no longer part of the Indiana State Museum and Historic Sites system. Its present-day owners and operators are the Friends of Ernie Pyle. The museum's visitor center, constructed from two World War II-era Quonset huts features displays, mostly of Pyle's wartime career.

=== Other sites named in Pyle’s honor ===
- Elementary schools named for Pyle include buildings in Clinton, Indiana; Indianapolis, Indiana; Bellflower, California; and Fresno, California.
- Other schools include Ernie Pyle Middle School in Albuquerque, New Mexico.
- A segment of U.S. Highway 36 from Danville, Indiana, to the Indiana/Illinois state line is known as the Ernie Pyle Memorial Highway. A memorial rest park named in Pyle's honor was established along U.S. 36, southeast of Dana.
- A street in Galax, Virginia.
- A road at Fort Riley, Kansas, bears his name, as well as a street at Fort Meade, Maryland.
- A small island in Cagles Mill Lake, southeast of the town of Cunot in Owen County, Indiana, bears his name.
- Ernie Pyle Reserve Center, Fort Totten, Queens, New York.
- A rest stop on Interstate 80 near Brighton, IN is named Ernie Pyle Travel Plaza.

== In popular culture ==
- The Story of G.I. Joe (1945), starring Burgess Meredith as Pyle, is based on Pyle's reports from North Africa and Italy, including "The Death of Captain Waskow". The film's producers donated a major portion of the proceeds toward scholarships at Indiana University.
- On November 11, 1999, Peanuts creator Charles Schulz paid tribute to Veterans Day with his comic strip of Snoopy honoring Ernie Pyle titled "Ernie Pyle – To Remember". The caption for Snoopy reads: "Another C-Ration Has Been Consumed in Your Honor, Ernie Pyle... We'll Never Forget You..."
- In 2002, the Hasbro toy company released an Ernie Pyle action figure.
- The protagonist/narrator of the Argentine comic book series Ernie Pike is said to have been inspired by Pyle, although the character physically resembles its creator.

== Selected published works ==
=== Notable column ===
"The Death of Captain Waskow", Pyle's most famous column, was written in December 1943 and published on January 10, 1944. The National Society of Newspaper Columnists later selected it as "the best American newspaper column of all time". The organization has bestowed the Ernie Pyle Lifetime Achievement Award annually since 1993.

=== Books ===
- Pyle's wartime writings are preserved in four books:
  - Ernie Pyle In England (1941)
  - Here Is Your War (1943)
  - Brave Men (1944)
  - Last Chapter (1949)
- Selected columns of Pyle's human-interest stories:
  - Home Country (1947)
