= USS Latimer =

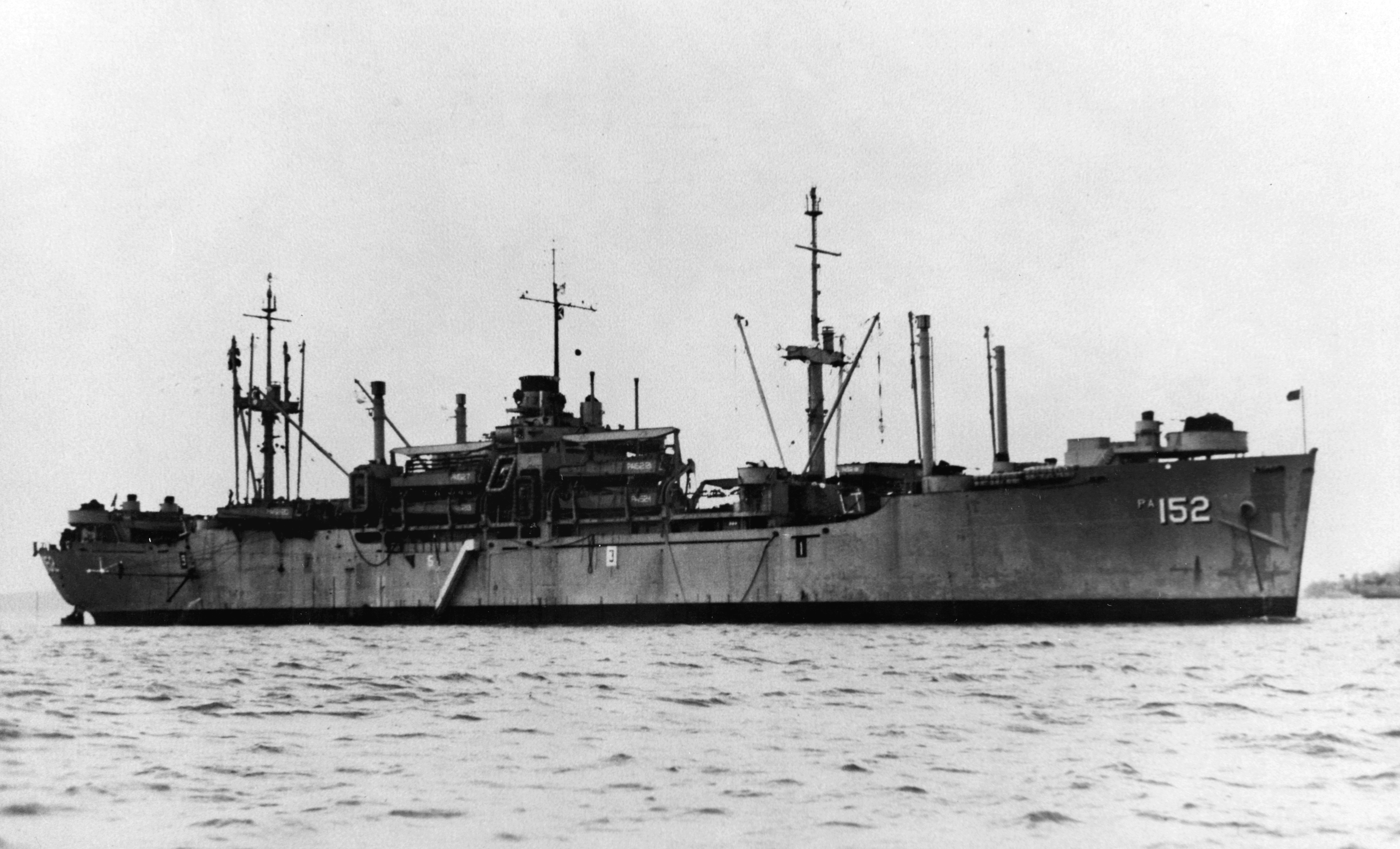
- USS Latimer (APA-152) off Toulon, France, 1951

History

United States
- Name: USS Latimer
- Namesake: Latimer County in eastern Oklahoma.
- Ordered: as type VC2-S-AP5
- Laid down: date unknown
- Launched: 4 July 1944
- Acquired: 28 August 1944
- Commissioned: 28 August 1944
- Decommissioned: 26 February 1947
- In service: 23 September 1950
- Out of service: 15 May 1956
- Stricken: 1 July 1960
- Fate: Sold for scrapping, 28 October 1971

General characteristics
- Displacement: 12,450 tons (full load)
- Length: 455 ft 0 in (138.68 m)
- Beam: 62 ft 0 in (18.90 m)
- Draught: 24 ft 0 in (7.32 m)
- Speed: 19 knots
- Complement: 536
- Armament: one 5 in (130 mm) gun mount, twelve 40 mm gun mounts, ten 20 mm gun mounts

USS Latimer (APA-152) was a Haskell-class attack transport in service with the United States Navy from 1944 to 1947 and from 1950 to 1956. She was scrapped in 1972.

== History ==
Latimer was launched under Maritime Commission contract 4 July 1944 by Oregon Shipbuilding Corp., Portland, Oregon; sponsored by Mrs. Melvin H. McCoy; acquired by the Navy 28 August 1944; and commissioned the same day at Astoria, Oregon.

=== World War II ===
Departing Seattle, Washington, 11 September 1944, Latimer steamed via San Francisco, California, to San Pedro, California, where she arrived 16 September. After shakedown off southern California, she embarked 1,301 troops at San Francisco and departed 26 October for the western Pacific Ocean. She sailed via Hollandia, New Guinea, and Noumea, New Caledonia, to the Solomons; arrived Guadalcanal 21 December for amphibious assault exercises; then steamed to Manus, Admiralties, 25 to 31 December to prepare for the invasion of Luzon.

Assigned to task group TG 77.9 as a reinforcement transport, Latimer cleared Seeadler Harbor 2 January 1945, bound for Lingayen Gulf. She arrived off San Fabian, Luzon, 11 January; discharged troops and support equipment; then steamed 13 to 27 January via Leyte Gulf and Manus to Wakde, New Guinea, where she embarked additional troops for passage to Luzon. After steaming to Lingayen Gulf 2 to 10 February, she sailed the 10th for Leyte Gulf and arrived 14 February to prepare for the invasion of Okinawa.

During most of March Latimer rehearsed assault landings off Samar before departing San Pedro Bay in convoy 27 March. Assigned to task group TG 55.3, she carried troops of the U.S. 96th Infantry Division and arrived off Hagushi, Okinawa, at dawn 1 April. She debarked troops at 0730 for the first wave against beaches Brown 1 and 2, then remained in the inner transport area to discharge troops and cargo until 1930, when she prepared for night retirement at sea. After successfully repelling a Japanese aerial attack at dawn 3 April, she completed unloading operations the following morning and departed Okinawa the 5th.

Steaming via Guam and Pearl Harbor, she arrived San Francisco Bay 29 April; proceeded to Seattle 20 to 22 May; embarked 1,422 troops; and departed 28 May for the Far East. After touching at Pearl Harbor, Eniwetok, and Ulithi, she arrived Hagushi 14 July and discharged troops and military cargo. With 350 veterans embarked she sailed 22 July for the United States via Ulithi and arrived San Francisco 10 August.

Between 7 and 27 September, Latimer transported 1,164 occupation troops from Pearl Harbor via Saipan to Honshū, Japan. She returned to Saipan 1 to 6 October; embarked 1,523 passengers; and departed 8 October on "Operation Magic Carpet" passage to the U.S. West Coast, arriving Seattle 19 October. During the next 4 months she made two more "Magic Carpet" voyages to the western Pacific from Seattle and San Francisco, carrying military passengers from Saipan and the Philippines to the U.S. west coast.

Arriving San Francisco 19 February 1946 after a voyage from Subic Bay, Luzon, Latimer departed 11 March for the U.S. East Coast. Steaming via the Panama Canal, she arrived Norfolk, Virginia, 26 March and for the next 5 months operated at Norfolk and Yorktown, Virginia. She entered Norfolk Navy Yard 27 August, decommissioned there 26 February 1947, and entered the Atlantic Reserve Fleet.

=== Cold War ===
Latimer recommissioned 23 September 1950 at Portsmouth, Virginia. Assigned to Transport Squadron 2, she operated out of Norfolk from the Virginia and North Carolina coast to Puerto Rico and the Caribbean, transporting U.S. Marines and participating in amphibious landing exercises. Departing Norfolk 31 August 1951, she embarked 2d Division Marines at Morehead City, North Carolina, before sailing 2 September for the Mediterranean. She arrived Oran, Algeria, 14 September and began a 4-month deployment with the U.S. 6th Fleet. During amphibious exercises she steamed throughout the Mediterranean and touched the coasts of France, Italy, and Greece and the Islands of Crete, Sardinia, and Sicily. Departing Naples, Italy, 29 January 1952, she returned to the United States and reached Norfolk 14 February.

For more than 2 years Latimer cruised in the Caribbean and along the eastern coast of North America from Florida to Greenland conducting Midshipman and U.S. Naval Reserve training cruises or engaging in amphibious landing training. Between 6 September 1954 and 30 January 1955 she again deployed to the Mediterranean, and after another year of operations along the eastern seaboard, she steamed from Brooklyn, New York, to Galveston, Texas, 2 to 9 February 1956.

=== Final decommissioning ===
Towed to Orange, Texas, 24 to 25 February, Latimer decommissioned 15 May and entered the Texas group of the Atlantic Reserve Fleet. In February 1960 she transferred to the Maritime Administration and was placed in the National Defense Reserve Fleet. She was berthed at Mobile, Alabama and was struck from the Navy list on 1 July 1960 and was scrapped in 1972.
