= Richmond Lattimore =

American poet and classicist (1906–1984)

- Born: May 6, 1906; Paotingfu, Qing China
- Died: February 26, 1984 (aged 77); Rosemont, Pennsylvania, U.S.
- Education: Dartmouth College (A.B.); Christ Church, Oxford (B.A.); University of Illinois (PhD)
- Occupation: Professor
- Known for: Translations of Greek classics
- Spouse: Alice Bockstahler

Richmond Alexander Lattimore (May 6, 1906 – February 26, 1984) was an American poet and classicist known for his translations of the Greek classics, especially his versions of the Iliad and Odyssey.

== Biography ==
Richmond Alexander Lattimore was born to David and Margaret Barnes Lattimore in Paotingfu, China. His parents were working as English teachers for the Chinese government. His family returned to the United States in 1920. He graduated from Dartmouth College in 1926 with a B.A. magna cum laude. His brother Owen Lattimore was a Sinologist who was blacklisted for his association with China during the McCarthy era, but subsequently rehabilitated when none of the charges against him proved to be true. Their sister Eleanor Frances Lattimore was an author and illustrator of children's books.

Richmond was a Rhodes Scholar at Christ Church, Oxford, and received his B.A. in 1932, and subsequently, under the direction of William Abbott Oldfather, received a Ph.D. from the University of Illinois in 1934. He joined the Department of Greek at Bryn Mawr College the following year, and married Alice Bockstahler, with whom he later had two sons, Steven and Alexander; Steven also became a classical scholar and professor at UCLA.

From 1943 to 1946, Lattimore was absent from his professorial post to serve in the United States Navy but returned after the war to remain at Bryn Mawr College, with periodic visiting positions at other universities, until his retirement in 1971. He continued to publish poems and translations for the remainder of his life, with two poems appearing in print posthumously.

Lattimore's translations of the Iliad (1951) and Odyssey (1965) were hailed as landmarks upon their publications, and they continue to serve as bases for comparison with newer versions. From 1953 to 1960, Lattimore partnered with David Grene to co-edit a complete translation of the Greek tragedies of Aeschylus, Sophocles, and Euripides for University of Chicago Press.

He translated the Book of Revelation in 1962. A 1979 edition by McGraw-Hill Ryerson included the four Gospels. Lattimore completed his translation of the entire New Testament, which was published posthumously in 1996 with the title The New Testament.

For many years, Lattimore accompanied his wife Alice to services at the Episcopal Church of the Good Shepherd, Rosemont, near Bryn Mawr College, a church with an Anglo-Catholic worship tradition. He chose to be baptized on Easter Eve 1983 and confirmed as a communicant there. He stated that his doubts about his faith had disappeared "somewhere in [the Gospel of] Saint Luke," which he had recently translated.

Lattimore died from cancer in Rosemont, Pennsylvania, on February 26, 1984, aged 77.

== Memberships and awards ==
Lattimore was a Fellow of the Academy of American Poets, and a member of Phi Beta Kappa, the National Institute of Arts and Letters, the American Academy of Arts and Sciences, the American Philosophical Society, the American Philological Association, and the Archaeological Institute of America, as well as a Fellow of the American Academy at Rome and an Honorary Student at Christ Church, Oxford. Lattimore's translation of Aristophanes' The Frogs won the Bollingen Poetry Translation Prize in 1962.

== Books ==
=== Translations ===
- The Odes of Pindar. Chicago: University of Chicago Press, 1947.
- Greek Lyrics. Chicago: University of Chicago Press, 1949. Revised 1960.
- The Iliad of Homer. Chicago: University of Chicago Press, 1951.
- The Works and Days; Theogony; The Shield of Herakles. Ann Arbor: University of Michigan Press, 1959.
- The Frogs. Ann Arbor: University of Michigan Press, 1962.
- The Odyssey of Homer. New York: Harper & Row, 1965.
- The Four Gospels and the Revelation, Newly Translated from the Greek. New York: Farrar Straus Giroux, 1979.
- Acts and Letters of the Apostles, Newly Translated from the Greek. New York: Farrar Straus Giroux, 1982.
- The New Testament. New York: Farrar Straus Giroux, 1996.

=== Poetry ===
- The Stride of Time. Ann Arbor: University of Michigan Press, 1966.
- Poems from Three Decades. New York: Charles Scribner's Sons, 1972.

== See also ==
- English translations of Homer#LattimoreIl
