= Eleanor Frances Lattimore =

American author and illustrator

Eleanor Frances Lattimore (June 30, 1904, Shanghai, China – May 12, 1986, Raleigh, North Carolina) was an American writer and illustrator born in what was called the American Compound in Shanghai and raised in China where her father, David Lattimore, taught English at a Chinese government university. She was the sister of poet and classics translator Richmond Lattimore and China expert Owen Lattimore.

The Lattimores were from the Washington, D. C. area where David Lattimore and his wife Margaret (Barnes) Lattimore had taught in secondary schools. They traveled by steamship to China in 1902 while Margaret was pregnant with their third child, Isabel. The Lattimores' two older children, Katharine and Owen, were born in the Washington, D. C. area; the three younger children, Isabel, Eleanor, and Richmond ("Dick") were born in China.

Eleanor Frances Lattimore came to the United States in 1920 after her father became a professor of Chinese Studies at Dartmouth College. She studied art in Oakland, California, Boston, and New York City and worked for several years as a freelance artist. But she became known as the author and illustrator of more than fifty popular children's books. A number of her stories are based on her experiences growing up in China. Her first book, Little Pear, published in 1931, is considered a children's classic. She continued to be a leading children's book author for most of five decades. Her 57th book, Proudfoot's Way, was published in 1978. "Pink Shoes", a picture book, was published as a paperback in 2016.

Eleanor Frances Lattimore married Robert Armstrong Andrews, a writer and newspaper man, in 1934 and they had two sons, Peter and Michael. The Andrews lived much of the time in Charleston and nearby Edisto Island, South Carolina, and some of her stories are based there and in New Orleans, Louisiana, and Miami, Florida where they also lived. Other stories are based on the adventures of her five grandchildren.

== Selected publications ==
- Source for this update = Eleanor Frances Lattimore's eldest son.
- 1931: Little Pear. New York: Harcourt Brace & Co.
- 1932: Jerry and the Pusa. New York: Harcourt Brace & Co.
- 1933: The Seven Crowns. New York: Harcourt Brace & Co.
- 1934: Little Pear and His Friends. New York: Harcourt Brace & Co.
- 1935: The Lost Leopard. New York: Harcourt Brace & Co.
- 1936: The Clever Cat. New York: Harcourt Brace & Co.
- 1938: Junior. New York: Harcourt Brace & Co.
- 1939: Jonny. New York: Harcourt Brace & Co.
- 1940: The Story of Lee Ling. New York: Harcourt Brace & Co.
- 1942: Storm on the Island. New York: Harcourt Brace & Co.
- 1942: The Questions of Lifu. New York: Harcourt Brace & Co.
- 1943: Peachblossom. New York: Harcourt Brace & Co.
- 1944: First Grade. New York: Harcourt Brace & Co.
- 1946: Bayou Boy. New York: William Morrow & Co.
- 1947: Jeremy's Isle. New York: William Morrow & Co.
- 1948: Three Little Chinese Girls. New York: William Morrow & Co. Published in England by Angus & Robertson
- 1949: Deborah's White Winter. New York: William Morrow & Co.
- 1949: Davy of the Everglades. New York: William Morrow & Co.
- 1950: Indigo Hill. New York: William Morrow & Co.
- 1950: Christopher and His Turtle. New York: William Morrow & Co.
- 1951: The Fig Tree. New York: William Morrow & Co.
- 1951: Bells for a Chinese Donkey. New York: William Morrow & Co. Published in England by Angus & Robertson
- 1952: Lively Victoria. New York: William Morrow & Co.
- 1953: Wu, the Gatekeeper's Son. New York: William Morrow & Co. Published in England by Angus & Robertson
- 1953: Jasper. New York: William Morrow & Co.
- 1954: Holly in the Snow. New York: William Morrow & Co.
- 1955: Diana in the China Shop. New York: William Morrow & Co.
- 1955: Willow Tree Village. New York: William Morrow & Co. Published in England by Angus & Robertson
- 1956: Molly in the Middle. New York: William Morrow & Co.
- 1956: Little Pear and the Rabbits. New York: William Morrow & Co. Published in England by Angus & Robertson
- 1957: The Monkey of Crofton. New York: William Morrow & Co.
- 1957: The Journey of Ching Lai. New York: William Morrow & Co. Published in England by Angus & Robertson
- 1958: Happiness for Kimi. New York: William Morrow & Co.
- 1958: Fair Bay. New York: William Morrow & Co. Published in England by Angus & Robertson
- 1959: The Fisherman's Son. William Morrow & Co. Published in England by Angus & Robertson
- 1959: The Youngest Artist. New York: William Morrow & Co.
- 1960: Beachcomber Boy. New York: William Morrow & Co.
- 1960: The Chinese Daughter. William Morrow & Co. Published in England by Angus & Robertson
- 1961: The Wonderful Glass House. New York: William Morrow & Co.
- 1961: Cousin Melinda. New York: William Morrow & Co.
- 1962: The Bittern's Nest. New York: William Morrow & Co. Published in England by Angus & Robertson
- 1962: Laurie and Company. New York: William Morrow & Co.
- 1963: Janetta's Magnet. New York: William Morrow & Co.
- 1963: The Little Tumbler. New York: William Morrow & Co. Published in England by Angus & Robertson
- 1964: Felicia. New York: William Morrow & Co. Published in England by Angus & Robertson
- 1965: The Mexican Bird. New York: William Morrow & Co. Published in England by Angus & Robertson
- 1965: The Bus Trip. New York: William Morrow & Co.
- 1966: The Search for Christina. New York: William Morrow & Co.
- 1967: The Two Helens. New York: William Morrow & Co.
- 1968: Bird Song. New York: William Morrow & Co.
- 1969: The Girl on the Deer. New York: William Morrow & Co.
- 1970: The Three Firecrackers. New York: William Morrow & Co.
- 1971: More About Little Pear. New York: William Morrow & Co.
- 1973: A Smiling Face. New York: William Morrow & Co.
- 1975: The Taming of Tiger. New York: William Morrow & Co.
- 1976: Adam's Key. New York: William Morrow & Co.
- 1978: Proudfoot's Way. New York: William Morrow & Co. Later published in softcopy as Which Way Black Cat?.
- 2016: Pink Shoes. Louisburg, North Carolina: Indigo Hill Books. Softcopy.
