= Prophecy of Ahijah =

Lost text mentioned in the Bible

The Prophecy of Ahijah is a lost text which may have been written by the biblical prophet Ahijah the Shilonite. The book is referred to in 2 Chronicles 9:29. The passage reads

"Now the rest of the acts of Solomon, first and last, are they not written in the book of Nathan the prophet, and in the prophecy of Ahijah the Shilonite, and in the visions of Iddo the Seer against (or concerning) Jeroboam the son of Nebat?"

Ahijah's prophecy is also mentioned in 2 Chronicles 10:15.

This manuscript is also called the Prophesy [sic] of Ahijah the Shilonite. The 1906 Jewish Encyclopedia suggests there might have been "a series of 'Tales of the Prophets' by various hands".

The account of the reign of Solomon given in 1 Kings (1 Kings 11:41) does not refer to this work.

== See also ==
- Table of books of Judeo-Christian Scripture
- Lost books of the New Testament
- Lost work
