= 2 Chronicles 33 =

Second Book of Chronicles, chapter 33

- ← chapter 32 chapter 34 →
- The complete Hebrew text of the Books of Chronicles (1st and 2nd Chronicles) in the Leningrad Codex (1008 CE).
- Book: Books of Chronicles
- Category: Ketuvim
- Christian Bible part: Old Testament
- Order in the Christian part: 14

2 Chronicles 33 is the thirty-third chapter of the Second Book of Chronicles the Old Testament of the Christian Bible or of the second part of the Books of Chronicles in the Hebrew Bible. The book is compiled from older sources by an unknown person or group, designated by modern scholars as "the Chronicler", and had the final shape established in late fifth or fourth century BCE. This chapter belongs to the section focusing on the kingdom of Judah until its destruction by the Babylonians under Nebuchadnezzar and the beginning of restoration under Cyrus the Great of Persia (2 Chronicles 10-36). It contains the regnal accounts of Manasseh and Amon, both kings of Judah.

== Text ==
This chapter was originally written in the Hebrew language and is divided into 25 verses.

=== Textual witnesses ===
Some early manuscripts containing the text of this chapter in Hebrew are of the Masoretic Text tradition, which includes the Codex Leningradensis (1008). (Note: Since 1947 the current text of Aleppo Codex is missing 2 Chronicles 26:19–35:7.)

There is also a translation into Koine Greek known as the Septuagint, made in the last few centuries BCE. Extant ancient manuscripts of the Septuagint version include Codex Vaticanus (B; $\mathfrak{G}$^{B}; 4th century), and Codex Alexandrinus (A; $\mathfrak{G}$^{A}; 5th century). (Note: The whole book of 2 Chronicles is missing from the extant Codex Sinaiticus.)

=== Old Testament references ===
- 2 Chronicles 33:1–9: 2 Kings 21:1–9
- 2 Chronicles 33:10–20: 1 Kings 21:10–18
- 2 Chronicles 33:21–25: 2 Kings 21:19–26.

== Manasseh, king of Judah (33:1–20) ==
Historically, Manasseh was regarded as an 'exceptionally skilful ruler', reigned on David's throne for 55 years, longer than any other king of Israel and Judah. The books of Kings portray him as the most godless king of all and extensively list his disgraceful behavior which mostly contributed to the downfall of Judah (2 Kings 21:1–18), but the Chronicler records his repentance during his deportation to Babylon, that when he returned to Jerusalem, he removed all foreign images, so the long reign was a result of this God-fearing behavior. The Assyrians' treatment of Manasseh (verse 11) was similar to the Babylonian's treatment of Jehoiachin at a later date (Ezekiel 19:9; 2 Chronicles 36:10). In his distress, Manasseh did as instructed in the temple-consecration prayer (cf. 2 Chronicles 6:36–39; 7:14), that he humbled himself and prayed to God, so .

=== Verse 1 ===
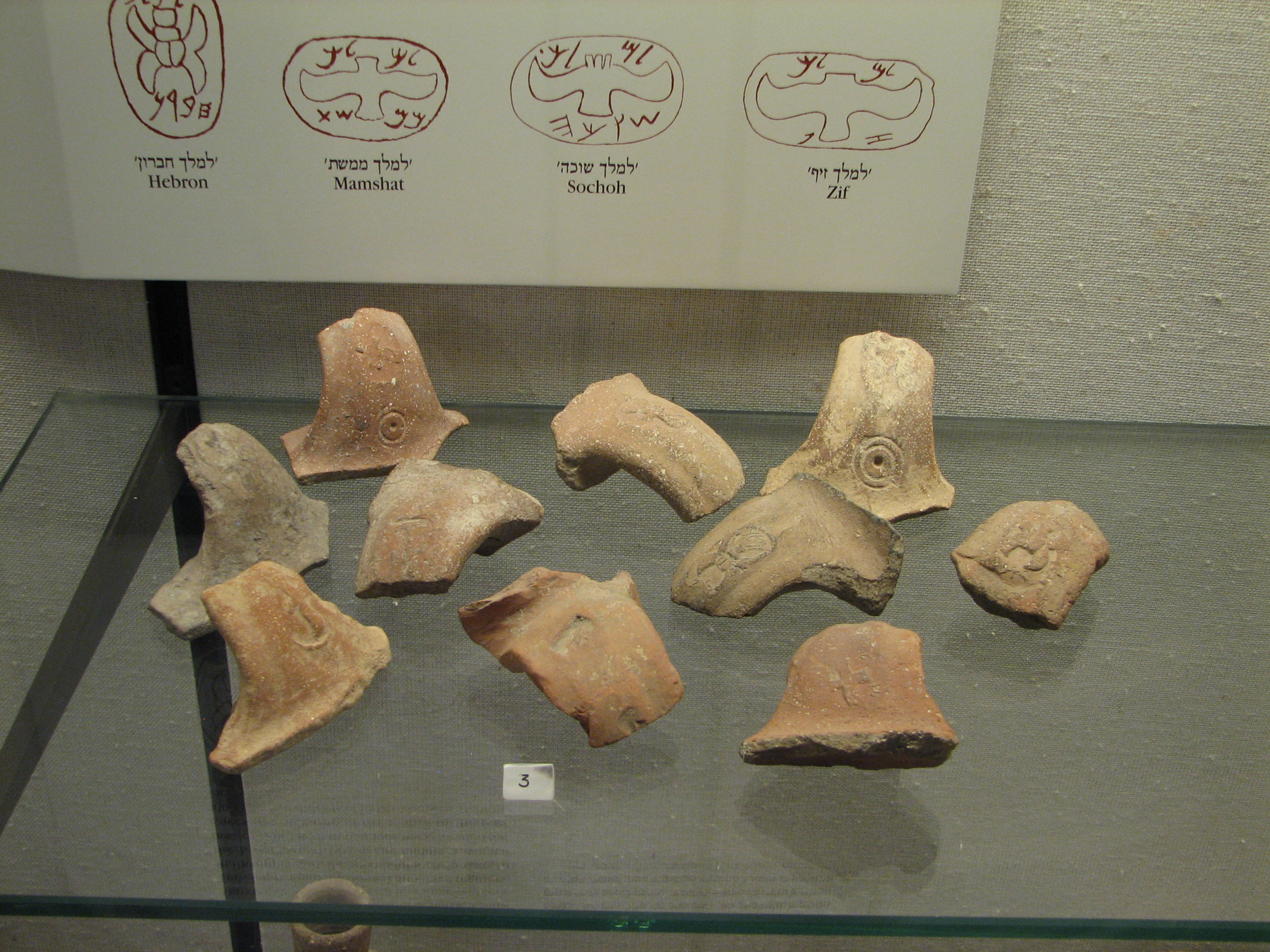
LMLK seals were stamped on the handles of large storage jars mostly in and around Jerusalem during the reign of King Hezekiah (circa 700 BC) in Hecht Museum, Israel.

Manasseh was twelve years old when he began to reign, and he reigned fifty-five years in Jerusalem.

- Cross reference: 2 Kings 21:1
- "55 years": according to Thiele's chronology, Manasseh became 'co-regent' with Hezekiah, his father, in September 697 BCE, then reigned alone starting between September 687 BCE and September 686 BCE until his death between September 643 and September 642 BCE.

Two seals appeared on the antiquities market in Jerusalem (first reported in 1963), both bearing the inscription, “Belonging to Manasseh, son of the king.” As the term "son of the king" refers to royal princes, whether they eventually ascended the throne or not, the seal is considered to be Manasseh's during his co-regency with his father. It bears the same iconography of the Egyptian winged scarab as the seals attributed to King Hezekiah, recalling the alliance between Hezekiah and Egypt against the Assyrians (2 Kings 18:21; Isaiah 36:6), and may symbolize 'a desire to permanently unite the northern and southern kingdoms together with God's divine blessing'. Jar handles bearing a stamp with a winged-beetle and the phrase LMLK ("to the king"), along with the name of a city, have been unearthed throughout ancient Judah as well as in a large administrative complex discovered outside of the old city of Jerusalem and used to hold olive oil, food, wine, etc – goods that were paid as taxes to the king, dated to the reigns of Hezekiah (cf. "Hezekiah's storehouses"; 2 Chronicles 32:27–28) and Manasseh. These artifacts provide the evidence of 'a complex and highly-organized tax system in Judah' from the time of Hezekiah extending into the time of Manasseh, among others to pay the tribute to the Assyrians.

=== Verses 11–13 ===
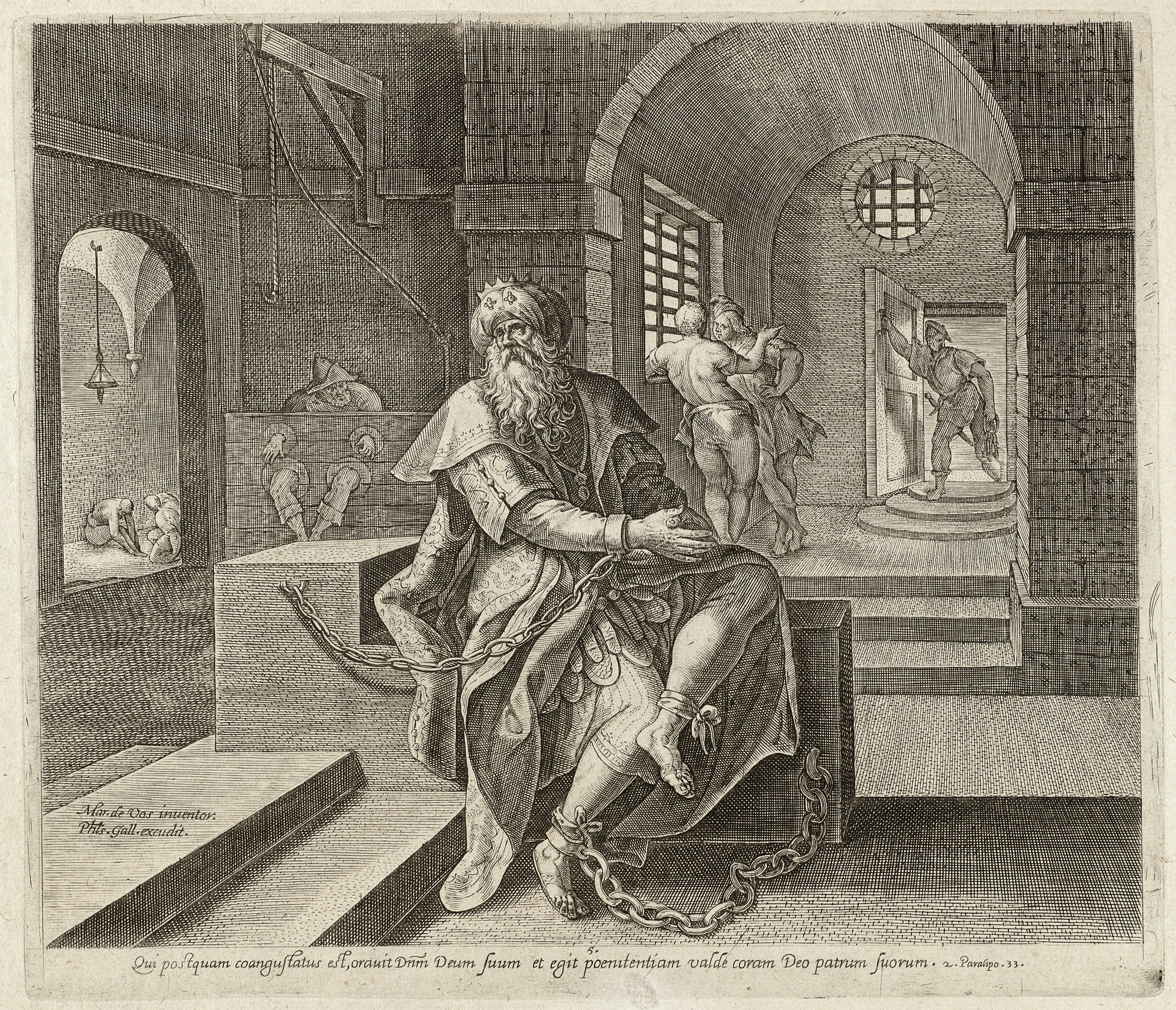
King Manasseh in prison praying to God (2 Chronicles 33:11–13). Bijbelse voorstellingen, Bijbelse figuren Literatuur. Hollstein Dutch, Maerten de Vos, 1141-1(2), dated between 1555 and 1612.

^{11} Therefore the Lord brought upon them the captains of the army of the king of Assyria, who took Manasseh with hooks, bound him with bronze fetters, and carried him off to Babylon.
^{12} Now when he was in affliction, he implored the Lord his God, and humbled himself greatly before the God of his fathers, ^{13} and prayed to Him; and He received his entreaty, heard his supplication, and brought him back to Jerusalem into his kingdom.
Then Manasseh knew that the Lord was God.

- "Hooks" or more specifically, "nose hooks"
- "Bronze fetters" or "chains"

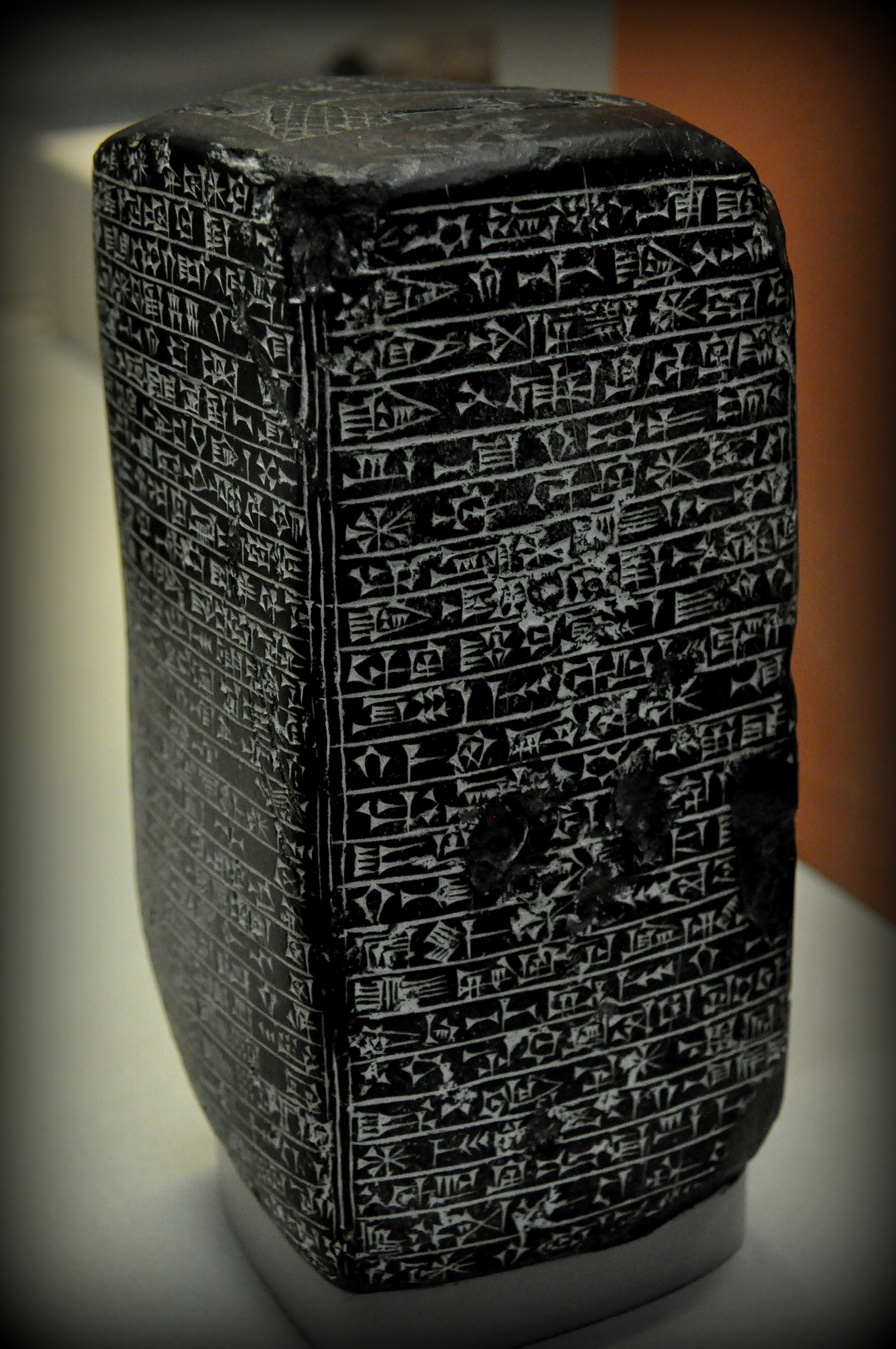
Black basalt monument of Esarhaddon in traditional Sumero-Akkadian cuneiform, which narrates his restoration of Babylon. Circa 670 BC. Exhibited at the British Museum, BM 91027.

- "Babylon": Esarhaddon is recorded to spend much time and energy to rebuild Babylon as an effort to quell Babylonian aspirations of independence, after the city had been destroyed by Esarhaddon's father, Sennacherib, in 689 BCE. The restoration of the city, announced by Esarhaddon in 680 BCE, became one of his most important projects.
- "He implored" or "he besought" (KJV), literally, "stroked the face", a phrase which also occurs in Exodus 32:11.
- "Prayed to Him": This could be related to the "Prayer of Manasseh", a short work of 15 verses recording a penitential prayer attributed to Manasseh, which appears in some Christian Bibles, but is considered apocryphal by Jews, Roman Catholics and Protestants. Another work by the same title, written in Hebrew and containing distinctly different content, was found among the Dead Sea Scrolls.

Manasseh was thought to have joined a widespread rebellion (or at least been suspected of having supported it) led by Shamash-shum-ukin, the king of Babylon, against his brother, the Assyrian king Ashurbanipal, in an attempt to take the empire for himself, in 652-648 BCE.

=== Verses 18-19 ===
Manasseh's prayer is said to have been recorded in the Annals of the Kings of Israel (verse 18) and in "the records of the seers", also called the "Sayings of Hozai" (verse 19).

== Amon, king of Judah (33:21–25) ==
The record of Amon's rule is brief (as also in 2 Kings 21) and he is mainly portrayed as a godless king.

=== Verse 21 ===
Amon was twenty-two years old when he began to reign, and he reigned two years in Jerusalem.

- Cross reference: 2 Kings 21:19
- "2 years": according to Thiele's chronology, Amon became king starting between September 643 BCE and September 642 BCE until his death between September 641 and September 640 BCE.

=== Verses 24–25 ===
^{24} Then his servants conspired against him, and killed him in his own house. ^{25} But the people of the land executed all those who had conspired against King Amon. Then the people of the land made his son Josiah king in his place.

The assassination of Amon is thought to be related to the rise of an extensive anti-Assyrian rebellion (recorded in Assyrian sources) organized in ʻEber ha-Nahar, the region between the Euphrates and the Mediterranean Sea, against the rule of Ashurbanipal, and at the same time, an attempt of Egypt under Psamtik I to conquer Assyrian territories in the southern Palestine. The faction in Jerusalem that wanted to throw off the yoke of Assyrian, succeeded in killing Amon who was pro-Assyrian, even as worshipping Assyrian gods. However, Assyrian army soon arrived in Syria and Palestine and suppressed the revolt with 'all the usual severity' (all inhabitants were killed or exiled to Assyria'), so the forces in Judah, who wanted to prevent a military clash with Assyria, exterminated the anti-Assyrian nobles.

== Extrabiblical documentation on Manasseh ==
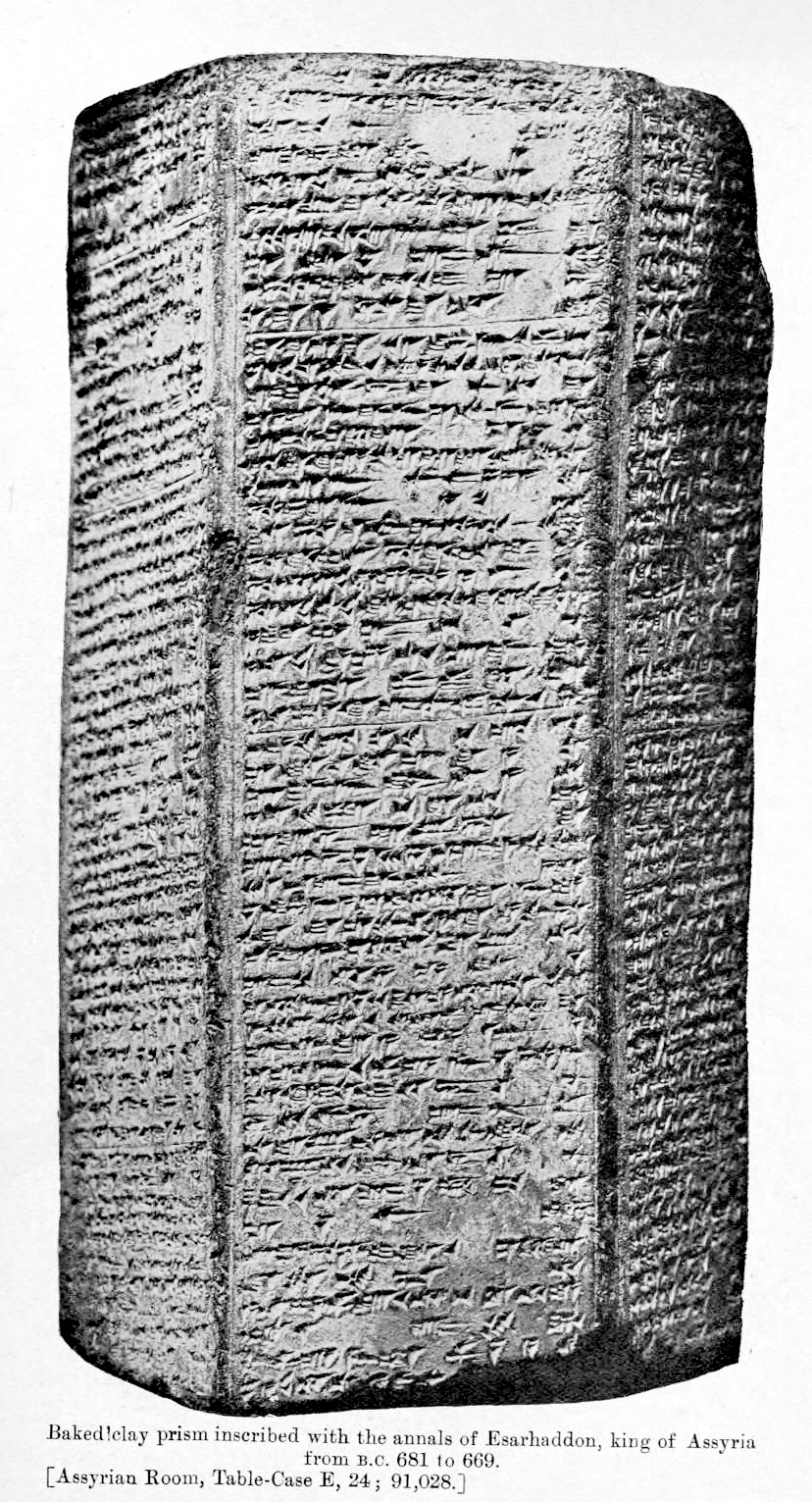
The best preserved of Esarhaddon's cylinders, British Museum BM 91028.

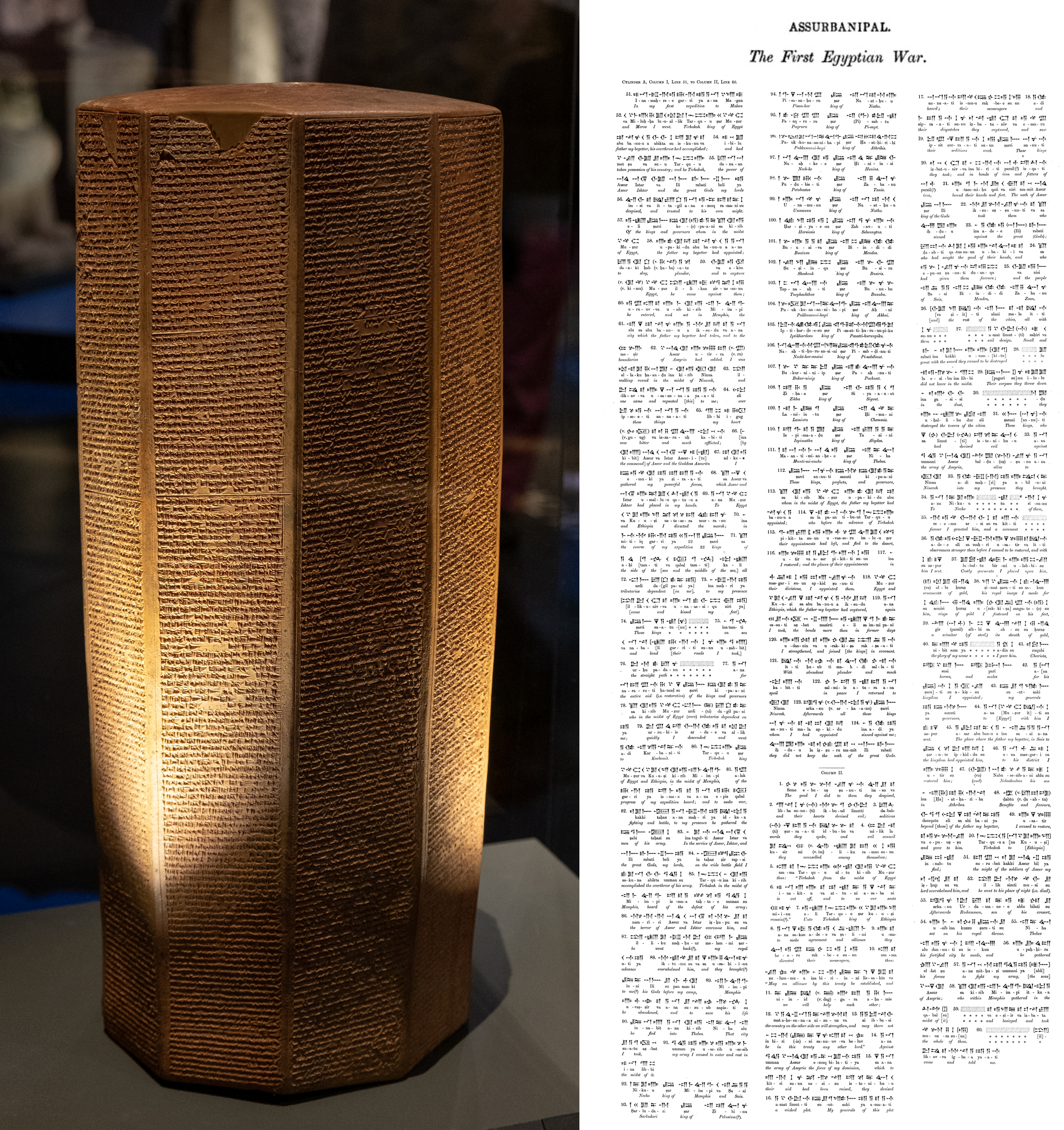
Rassam cylinder with translation of the First Assyrian Conquest of Egypt, 643 BCE.

In rabbinic literature on "Isaiah" and Christian pseudepigrapha "Ascension of Isaiah", Manasseh is accused of executing the prophet Isaiah, who was identified as the maternal grandfather of Manasseh.

Manasseh is mentioned in chapter 21 of 1 Meqabyan, a book considered canonical in the Ethiopian Orthodox Tewahedo Church, where he is used as an example of ungodly king.

Manasseh and the kingdom of Judah are only mentioned in the list of subservient kings/states in Assyrian inscriptions of Esarhaddon and Ashurbanipal.

Manasseh is listed in annals of Esarhaddon as one of the 22 vassal kings from the area of the Levant and the islands whom the Assyrian king conscripted to deliver timber and stone for the rebuilding of his palace at Nineveh.

Esarhaddon's son and successor, Ashurbanipal, mentions "Manasseh, King of Judah" in his annals, which are recorded on the "Rassam cylinder" (or "Rassam Prism", now in the British Museum), named after Hormuzd Rassam, who discovered it in the North Palace of Nineveh in 1854. The ten-faced, cuneiform cylinder contains a record of Ashurbanipal's campaigns against Egypt and the Levant, that involved 22 kings "from the seashore, the islands and the mainland", who are called "servants who belong to me", clearly denoting them as Assyrian vassals. Manasseh was one of the kings who "brought tribute to Ashurbanipal and kissed his feet".

== See also ==
- Asherah pole
- Assyria
- Babylon
- David
- Gihon
- Hezekiah
- Jerusalem
- Josiah
- Ophel
- Solomon's Temple
- Valley of Hinnom
- Related Bible parts: 2 Kings 21, 2 Chronicles 34, Zephaniah 1

== Sources ==
- Ackroyd, Peter R (1993). "Chronicles, Books of". In Metzger, Bruce M; Coogan, Michael D (eds.). The Oxford Companion to the Bible. Oxford University Press. pp. 113–116. ISBN 978-0195046458.
- Bennett, William (2018). The Expositor's Bible: The Books of Chronicles. Litres. ISBN 978-5040825196.
- Cole, Steven W.; Machinist, Peter (1998). Letters From Priests to the Kings Esarhaddon and Assurbanipal (PDF). Helsinki University Press. ISBN 978-1575063294.
- Coogan, Michael David (2007). Coogan, Michael David; Brettler, Marc Zvi; Newsom, Carol Ann; Perkins, Pheme (eds.). The New Oxford Annotated Bible with the Apocryphal/Deuterocanonical Books: New Revised Standard Version, Issue 48 (Augmented 3rd ed.). Oxford University Press. ISBN 9780195288810.
- Dietrich, Walter (2007). "13. 1 and 2 Kings". In Barton, John; Muddiman, John (eds.). The Oxford Bible Commentary (first (paperback) ed.). Oxford University Press. pp. 232–615. ISBN 978-0199277186.
- Mathys, H. P. (2007). "14. 1 and 2 Chronicles". In Barton, John; Muddiman, John (eds.). The Oxford Bible Commentary (first (paperback) ed.). Oxford University Press. pp. 267–308. ISBN 978-0199277186.
- McFall, Leslie (1991), "Translation Guide to the Chronological Data in Kings and Chronicles" (PDF), Bibliotheca Sacra, 148: 3–45, archived from the original (PDF) on August 27, 2010
- Nelson, Thomas (2014). NIV, Chronological Study Bible, EBook: Holy Bible, New International Version. Brazil: Thomas Nelson. ISBN 9781401680138.
- Porter, Barbara N. (1993). Images, Power, and Politics: Figurative Aspects of Esarhaddon's Babylonian Policy. American Philosophical Society. ISBN 9780871692085.
- Sweeney, Marvin (2007). I & II Kings: A Commentary. Westminster John Knox Press. ISBN 978-0-664-22084-6.
- Thiele, Edwin R. (1983). The Mysterious Numbers of the Hebrew Kings (3rd ed.). Grand Rapids, Michigan: Zondervan. ISBN 978-0-310-36010-0.
- Würthwein, Ernst (1995). The Text of the Old Testament. Translated by Rhodes, Erroll F. Grand Rapids, MI: Wm. B. Eerdmans. ISBN 0-8028-0788-7.
