= Source criticism (biblical studies) =

Attempt to establish the sources used by the authors and redactors of a biblical text

Source criticism, in biblical criticism, refers to the attempt to establish the sources used by the authors and redactors of a biblical text. It originated in the 18th century with the work of Jean Astruc, who adapted the methods already developed for investigating the texts of classical antiquity (in particular, Homer's Iliad) to his own investigation into the sources of the Book of Genesis. It was subsequently considerably developed by German scholars in what was known as "the higher criticism", a term no longer in widespread use. The ultimate aim of these scholars was to reconstruct the history of the biblical text and also the religious history of ancient Israel.

== Principles ==
In general, the closer a source is to the event which it purports to describe, the more one can trust it to give an accurate description of what really happened. In the Bible where a variety of earlier sources have been quoted, the historian seeks to identify and date those sources used by biblical writers as the first step in evaluating their historical reliability.

In other cases, Bible scholars use the way a text is written (changes in style, vocabulary, repetitions, and the like) to determine what sources may have been used by a biblical author. With some reasonable guesswork it is possible to deduce sources not identified as such (e.g., genealogies). Some inter-biblical sources can be determined by virtue of the fact that the source is still extant, for example, where the Books of Chronicles quotes or retells the accounts of the books of Samuel and Kings.

== Tanakh ==
Source criticism has been applied to several parts of the Tanakh (the Hebrew Bible or Old Testament).

=== Documentary hypothesis ===
The documentary hypothesis considers the sources for the Pentateuch (the first five books of the Bible), claiming that it derives from four separate sources: the Yahwist, Elohist, Deuteronomist, and Priestly:

- The Jahwist (J) source is characterized by calling God "YHWH", depicts him as human-like, and is especially concerned with the kingdom of Judah. It is thought to have been written c. 950 BCE.
- The Elohist (E) source is characterized by calling God "Elohim" and deals more with the kingdom of Israel. It is thought to have been written c. 850 BCE.
- The Deuteronomic (D) source is characterized by a sermon-like style mostly concerned with law. It is thought to have been written c. 721–621 BCE.
- The Priestly (P) is characterized by a formal style that is mostly concerned with priestly matters. It is thought to have been written c. 550 BCE.

For example, of the two creation stories at the start of Genesis, the first is ascribed to P, while the second (the creation of Adam and Eve in chapter 2) is ascribed to J.

The documentary hypothesis historically dominated Pentateuch scholarship and continues to influence many scholars, though its classic JEDP form has been substantially revised or abandoned by many researchers in favor of alternative models such as supplementary, fragmentary, or neo-documentary approaches.

=== Other cases ===
The writers of the Tanakh sometimes mention sources they use. These include Acts of Solomon (1 Kings 11:41), Chronicles of the Kings of Judah (1 Kings 14:29 and in a number of other places), Chronicles of the Kings of Israel (1 Kings 14:19 and in a number of other places), the Book of Jashar (Josh 10:12–14, 2 Sam 1:18–27, and possibly to be restored via textual criticism to 1 Kings 8:12), and Book of the Wars of the Lord (Num 21:14).

A more complicated and speculative form of source criticism results from critical evaluation of style, vocabulary, reduplication, and discrepancies. An example of this kind of source criticism is found in the book of Ezra–Nehemiah (typically treated by biblical scholars as one book) where scholars identify four types of source material: letters to and from Persian officials, lists of things, the Ezra memoir (where Ezra speaks in first person), and the Nehemiah memoir (where Nehemiah speaks in first person). It is thus deduced that the writer of Ezra–Nehemiah had access to these four kinds of source material in putting together his book.

Source criticism also leads many scholars towards redaction of the book of Isaiah from original multiple authorship.

== New Testament ==
In the study of the New Testament, an example of source criticism is the study of the Synoptic problem. Critics noticed that the three Synoptic Gospels, Matthew, Mark and Luke, were very similar, indeed, at times identical. The most popular view accounting for the duplication is called the two-source hypothesis. The 2SH attempts to solve the synoptic problem by advancing Marcan priority to explain the triple tradition, and the existence of the Q document to solve the double tradition. Matthew and Luke used Mark and a second source, called Q not extant, for the sayings found in both of them but not in Mark. However, other theories that posit direct use of Matthew by Luke or vice versa without Q are increasing in popularity within scholarship.

There has been a scholarly turn against source-criticism of the gospels. Johannine scholars have moved away from proposing hypothetical sources or reconstructions behind the gospel of John, and the rise of the Farrer Hypothesis in Synoptic studies can be attributed to this shift as well.

== See also ==
- Historical criticism in Bible studies
