= Story of the Prophet Iddo =

Lost biblical text attributed to Iddo

The Story of the Prophet Iddo (also called the Midrash of the Prophet Iddo and Visions of Iddo the Seer, Hebrew: בחזות יעדי החזה, romanized: baḥăzōṯ Ye‘dî ha-ḥōzeh) is a lost work mentioned in the Bible, attributed to the biblical prophet Iddo who lived at the time of King Rehoboam.

== Biblical references ==
The book is described at 2 Chronicles 9:29, relating to the acts of Solomon:

"Now the rest of the acts of Solomon, first and last, are they not written in the book of Nathan the prophet, and in the prophecy of Ahijah the Shilonite, and in the visions of Iddo the seer against Jeroboam the son of Nebat?"

It is also described in 2 Chronicles 12:15, relating to acts of Rehoboam:

"Now the acts of Rehoboam, first and last, are they not written in the book of Shemaiah the prophet, and of Iddo the seer concerning genealogies? And there were wars between Rehoboam and Jeroboam continually."

The book is also described at 2 Chronicles 13:22, relating to relating to acts of Abijah:

"And the rest of the acts of Abijah, and his ways, and his sayings, are written in the story of the prophet Iddo."

Nehemiah 12:16 and Zech 1:1 tell us that Zechariah the Prophet was a descendant of a man named Iddo, but this is not the same person as Iddo the Prophet.
