= Far Eastern Bible College =

Far Eastern Bible College 远东神学院 (Chinese) Kolej Alkitab Timur Jauh (Malay) தூர கிழக்கு வேதாகம கல்லூரி (Tamil)

Location
- 9A Gilstead Road; 309063; Singapore
- Coordinates: 1.3156°N 103.8382°E

Information
- Type: Seminary
- Motto: "Holding forth the Word of Life" (Phil 2:16) "Holding fast the Faithful Word" (Titus 1:9)
- Religious affiliation: Christianity
- Denomination: Bible-Presbyterian
- Established: 17 September 1962
- Founder: Timothy Tow
- Principal: Jeffrey Khoo
- Staff: 8
- Faculty: 14
- Gender: Mixed
- Enrolment: Approx. 100
- Colours: Blue, gold
- Graduates: Approx. 700
- Website: www.febc.edu.sg

Far Eastern Bible College (abbreviation: FEBC; Chinese: 远东神学院; Malay: Kolej Alkitab Timur Jauh; Tamil: தூர கிழக்கு வேதாகம கல்லூரி) is a reformed, fundamentalist, and separatist Bible-Presbyterian theological institution located at Gilstead Road, under the Novena Planning Area, within the Central Region of Singapore. Founded in 1962 by Timothy Tow, FEBC is the fourth oldest Bible college in the country. The current principal is Jeffrey Khoo.

The college motto is "Holding forth the Word of Life" (Phil 2:16) and "Holding fast the Faithful Word" (Titus 1:9).

== History ==
Far Eastern Bible College was established on 17 September 1962 as an autonomous institution independent of ecclesiastical control. It shares premises with the Life Bible-Presbyterian Church (LBPC), but the two organisations had a falling out over a doctrinal issue. In 2008, the church sued the college over what it considered to be "deviant Bible teachings", and sought to force FEBC to leave the Gilstead Road premises.

The FEBC faculty had been promoting a doctrine known as "Verbal Plenary Preservation", which states that the text of Scripture has been perfectly preserved. However the church failed as the Court of Appeal, the apex court in the Singapore legal system, held on 26 April 2011 that (i) “the VPP doctrine is actually closely related to the VPI doctrine which both parties [i.e., FEBC and LBPC ] adhere to,” (rejecting LBPC's contention in [59] of the Court of Appeal Judgement that it is “an entirely different creature from the VPI doctrine");” (ii) “the College, in adopting the VPP doctrine, has not deviated from the fundamental principles which guide and inform the work of the College right from its inception, and as expressed in the Westminster Confession”; (iii) “[i]t is not inconsistent for a Christian who believes fully in the principles contained within the Westminster Confession (and the VPI [Verbal Plenary Inspiration] doctrine) to also subscribe to the VPP doctrine”; and (iv) “[i]n the absence of anything in the Westminster Confession that deals with the status of the apographs, we [the Court] hesitate to find that the VPP doctrine is a deviation from the principles contained within the Westminster Confession.

== Doctrine ==
Far Eastern Bible College subscribes to the system of theology called "Reformed" as expressed in the Westminster Confession of Faith, and its Larger and Shorter Catechisms (1643–1648). The college rejects the documentary hypothesis, source criticism, Form criticism, and redaction criticism.

== Culture ==
=== College anthem ===
The "FEBC Anthem" was written by the founding principal to music composed by M. D. Buell and arranged by Dave Haas. The early years of hardships and difficulties moved the founding principal to write the lyrics while on a train journey from Singapore to Kuala Lumpur in 1966.

=== Dean Burgon Oath ===
Since 1979, the Dean Burgon Oath has been taken by members of the board of directors and Faculty at every annual convocation to publicly affirm their allegiance to the Bible:

I swear in the name of the triune God—Father, Son and Holy Spirit—that the Bible is none other than the voice of Him that sitteth upon the throne. Every book of it, every chapter of it, every verse of it, every word of it, every syllable of it, every letter of it, is the direct utterance of the Most High. The Bible is none other than the Word of God, not some part of it more, some part of it less, but all alike the utterance of Him that sitteth upon the throne, faultless, unerring, supreme. So help me God. Amen.

== Academic programmes ==
=== Non-degree programmes ===
- Certificate of Religious Knowledge (CertRK)
- Certificate of Biblical Studies (CertBS)
- Diploma of Theology (DipTh)

=== Degree programmes ===
- Bachelor of Religious Education (BRE)
- Bachelor of Theology (Th.B.)
- Master of Religious Education (MRE)
- Master of Divinity (M.Div.)
- Master of Theology (Th.M.)
- Doctor of Theology (Th.D.)

=== In-ministry programmes ===
- Master of Ministry (M.Min.)
- Doctor of Education (Ed.D.)

== Publications ==
The Burning Bush
- Discipline: Theology
- Language: English
- Edited by: Jeffrey Khoo

Publication details
- History: 1995–present
- Publisher: Far Eastern Bible College (Singapore)
- Frequency: Biannual

Standard abbreviations
- ISO 4: Burn. Bush

Indexing
- ISSN: 0219-5984
- OCLC no.: 939112232

Links
- Journal homepage

The college publishes a theological journal, The Burning Bush, a biannual academic journal. It is distributed for free to students and alumni of the college and members of the Bible-Presbyterian churches. The editor-in-chief is Jeffrey Khoo. The journal was established in 1971 as a newsletter of the college. In 1995 it was replaced with the present journal format to allow for longer articles such as term papers, graduate theses, and faculty write-ups. The papers published reflect the reformed, premillennial, and separatist stance of the college.

== Principals ==
- Timothy Tow (17 September 1962 - 20 April 2009)
- Jeffrey Khoo (1 May 2009 – present)

== See also ==
- Khoo Jeffrey and others v Life Bible-Presbyterian Church and others
