= Khoo Jeffrey and others v Life Bible-Presbyterian Church and others =

Landmark case decided in 2011 by the Court of Appeal of Singapore

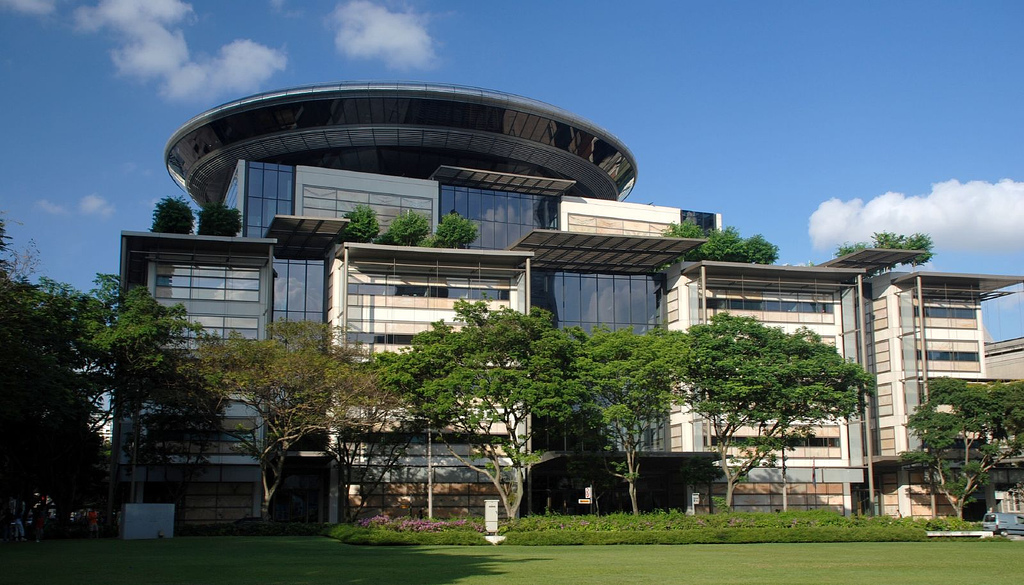
- The Supreme Court Building, photographed in April 2007
- Court: Court of Appeal of Singapore
- Full case name: Khoo Jeffrey and others v Life Bible-Presbyterian Church and others
- Decided: 26 April 2011
- Citations: Khoo Jeffrey and others v Life Bible-Presbyterian Church and others [2011] SGCA 18

Case history
- Prior actions: Life Bible-Presbyterian Church v Khoo Eng Teck Jeffrey and others and another suit [2010] SGHC 187
- Subsequent actions: Khoo Jeffrey and others v Life Bible-Presbyterian Church and others [2012] SGCA 37

Court membership
- Judges sitting: Chao Hick Tin, Andrew Phang Boon Leong and V.K. Rajah JJ.A.

Case opinions
- Charitable purpose trusts

Khoo Jeffrey and others v Life Bible-Presbyterian Church and others [2011] SGCA ("FEBC v Life Bible-Presbyterian Church") is a landmark case decided in 2011 by the Court of Appeal of Singapore. It is the first case in Singapore which the apex court considered the issue of a breach of a charitable purpose trusts when a religious charity is alleged to have deviated from the fundamental principles upon which it was founded.

== Background ==
In 2008, as a result of a dispute between Life Bible-Presbyterian Church and Far Eastern Bible College ("FEBC") over the doctrine of verbal plenary preservation ("VPP"), the church sued the college directors, including the church's founding pastor Timothy Tow, over allegedly “deviant Bible teachings” in an attempt to force FEBC to leave the Gilstead Road premises (the “Premises”).

The Church's suit, Suit No 648 of 2008, was filed on 15 September 2008 in the High Court. After the Attorney-General, in responding to FEBC's application which was objected to by the Church, had given his consent on 8 October 2008 to certain FEBC directors to institute a suit in the High Court for a declaration that the registered proprietors of the Premises hold the properties on a charitable purpose trust for the benefit and use of a Bible College administered by the directors of FEBC, the FEBC directors filed in January 2009 Originating Summons 6 of 2009 which was converted into a writ action in Suit 278 of 2009. The two actions (Suit 648 of 2008 and Suit 278 of 2009) were consolidated in March 2009 with the Church named as the plaintiffs and the FEBC directors as the defendants in Life Bible-Presbyterian Church v Khoo Eng Teck Jeffrey and others and another suit [2010] SGHC 187 ("Life Bible-Presbyterian Church v FEBC").

The Church (as plaintiffs) prevailed in Life Bible-Presbyterian Church v FEBC heard in the High Court. However, the FEBC directors (as appellants) won the appeal in FEBC v Life Bible-Presbyterian Church heard in the Court of Appeal.

== High Court decision ==
The High Court, which disagreed with the College’s submission that the Church had not obtained the Attorney-General’s consent before commencing its suit and therefore the suit had to fail in limine, agreed with the Church that no such consent was required as its pleaded case was founded in the law of trespass in that the Church was attempting to exercise its proprietary right to evict persons the Church alleged to be trespassers from the Premises; this was unlike the College which contended that it was trying to enforce a charitable trust and therefore would require the Attorney-General’s consent (which was duly obtained), as the existence of such a trust in the College’s favour grants it the right to occupy the Premises. Consequently, without the Church’s case ruled by the High Court as failing, it found that the Church was entitled to the reliefs claimed.

=== Issues before the High Court ===
See paras 26-31 of the High Court Judgment [2010] SGHC 187 for the issues before the Court.

The Church contended that the College is a ministry of the Church. However, if the College is regarded as a separate charitable purpose and entitled to the joint use of the Premises, the Church contended that the Defendants in registering the FEBC in 2004 as a charity with a new constitution (with VPP stated as a doctrine) no longer has the right to use and occupy the Premises. The Church also contended that while the Defendants are members of the 2004 College, they have not proven themselves to be the (original) College's board of directors and the Church is ready and willing to continue with the ministry of the College or a Bible college with the original FEBC constitution.

The Defendants denied the Church's allegations that the College is a ministry of the Church and they have constituted a new college by registering FEBC as a charity in January 2004 with a new constitution to “formalise” the College's independence, since the new constitution was only used because the original constitution could not be found.

=== Holding of the High Court ===
On 30 June 2010, the learned Judith Prakash J, as she then was, held that the College is not a ministry of the Church but is an independent organisation constituted as an unincorporated association. While she also agreed with the Defendants that the Premises are subject to charitable purpose trusts for the use and benefit of the Church and the College, because the funds for the acquisition of the land and the construction of the properties on the Premises were raised for both the Church and the College, she ruled that the college run by the Defendants is a different one as it has an entirely new constitution.

As the courts have recognised that doctrine is fundamental to the nature and character of a religious purpose trust (Bishop of Natal v Gladstone (1866) LR 3 Eq 1), Prakash J further held that the 2004 College could not benefit from the charitable purpose trusts as the new constitution has VPP as a cornerstone doctrine while the (original) Constitution makes no mention of the same doctrine. She also held that while the Defendants are the directors of the 2004 College, they have not shown themselves to be the directors of the College. As such, she held that they have no locus standi to bring an application for a declaration of trust on behalf of the College, and the 2004 College has no basis to occupy, possess or use the Premises. The Church was therefore held entitled to the reliefs claimed, which include an injunction to restrain the Defendants and the 2004 College from remaining on or continuing in occupation of the Premises and to vacate and deliver up vacant possession of those parts of the Premises occupied, and to an account of the money held in the accounts of the College as of the date of registration of the 2004 College under the Charities Act.

== Court of Appeal decision ==
The Defendants appealed the decision of the learned Prakash J to the Court of Appeal of Singapore, the apex court in Singapore's legal system, and their appeal was allowed: see Court of Appeal [2011] SGCA 18.

In allowing the appeal, the appellate court in its judgement of 26 April 2011 remarked – with regard to whether the Appellants (i.e. the Defendants in the High Court case) are the current members of the College Board – that if the High Court Judge was of the opinion that the members of the College Board (who are members of the College as an unincorporated association) cannot be ascertained, she should have ordered the dissolution of the College under the equitable jurisdiction of the High Court: Re Lead Company’s Workmen’s Fund Society [1904] 2 Ch 196 – but she did not – and the property held for the purpose of the College should have been dealt with according to the relevant provisions in the Charities Act. (See below in "Issues before the Court of Appeal" on the third and the fourth issues.)

=== Issues before the Court of Appeal ===
Chao Hick Tin JA, in delivering the judgment of the Court of Appeal, listed in para 18 the appellate court's analysis of the High Court Judge's decision on the following issues:

(i) Is the College a ministry of the Church?

(ii) Is the College an unincorporated association or a charitable trust?

(iii) Are the Premises impressed with a charitable trust in favour of the joint use of the College and the Church?

(iv) Are the Appellants the current directors of the Board of the College?

(v) What is the legal effect arising from the Appellants’ act of registering a college in the College's name but with a different constitution?

Also before the appellate court was the issue of whether the College's adoption (and teaching) of VPP, as alleged by the Respondents, would constitute such a fundamental shift that the College should be regarded as pursuing something so different from its original objects that it ceases to be entitled to use the Premises, as trustees holding the Premises must ensure that only persons/entities pursuing the objects of the trust will be allowed to enjoy the benefits under it.

=== Holding of the Court of Appeal ===
On the first two issues, while the Court of Appeal agreed with Prakash J that the College is not a ministry of the Church and the College is an unincorporated association, the latter finding is regarded by the appellate court as hardly of any consequence since a charity may exist in one of several legal structures with the most basic forms being the trust, the unincorporated association or the incorporated entity (see Peter Luxton, The Law of Charities (Oxford University Press, 2001) at 255). In addition, the appellate court pointed out that there is no reason why Prakash J should require the Appellants to give the Respondents an account of the money held in the accounts of the College as of the date of its registration as a charity, since the College is found to be not a ministry of the Church.

On the third issue, the appellate court also agreed with Prakash J that the Premises are impressed with a charitable trust for the joint use of the Church and the College. However, it disagreed with Prakash J on the fourth issue that the Appellants have not established, on a balance of probabilities, that they are the members of the Board of Directors of the College. The appellate court pointed out that if Prakash J was of the opinion that the members of the Board (who are members of the College as an unincorporated association) cannot be ascertained, she should have ordered – which she did not – that the College be dissolved under the equitable jurisdiction of the High Court and the property that is held for the purpose of the College (i.e., that part of the Premises that is impressed with a charitable purpose in favour of the College and the money in the College's accounts) should then either be applied cy-pres, handed to the Public Trustee, or turned over to the Commissioner of Charities (ss 21, 23 and 26B respectively). (Section 26B is now section 27 in the current version of the Charities Act: see “Power to direct application of charity property after charity ceases to exist” in section 26B of the 2 January 2021 version (pdf) and in section 27 of the 31 December 2021 version (pdf) of the Charities Act 1994 at the Singapore Attorney-General Chambers' website.)

On the fourth issue, the appellate court was of the view that the College's board did not dissolve in 1989 when Dr Tow Siang Hwa stepped down as President and new members were appointed/elected to replace those who had resigned after Dr Tow left. The Church's witness Mr Khoo Peng Kiat, who was a member of the board from 1979 to 2003, had during cross-examination said that “the board continues” after the resignations in 1989. Although Mr Khoo was ambivalent on re-examination, the Judges of Appeal were fortified in their view that the Board did not dissolve in 1989 as the FEBC Constitution does not have any provision for the dissolution of the Board. Under the Constitution, the Board was intended to be a self-perpetuating body whereby the current members would elect new individuals to fill any vacancies on the Board.

On whether the Appellants had adduced sufficient evidence to show that they are the current members of the Board, the appellate court underscored that none of the Respondents’ witnesses, who claimed to be past members of the Board (Mr Khoo Peng Kiat, Mr Quek Kiok Chiang, Mr Joshua Lim, etc.), produced any documentation as proof of their membership. The Judges of Appeal held that it would be unfair to challenge the Appellants’ claim to membership of the Board as what is sauce for the goose must certainly be sauce for the gander.

In addition, the Respondent's counsel did not in his submissions challenge the composition of the Board as reflected in its minutes before 1989, and four of the nine Appellants were “welcomed” as new board members by the existing members, including Mr Khoo Peng Kiat, in the 1990 minutes. There was also no objection to Dr Jeffrey Khoo joining the Board in 2001 as evident in the 2001 minutes; and no problem too with the other three current Board members who joined after Dr Jeffrey Khoo. Despite the widespread publicity which the case engendered, the Judges of Appeal pointed out that no one, including the Respondents, had intervened in the litigation on the basis that they were the current members of the Board and the Appellants have been in control of the College and running it since 1990. The correspondence between the Respondents and the Appellants show that the Respondents had dealt with the Appellants in their capacities as members of the Board, and it was only until the commencement of the litigation that they started to deny the Appellants’ capacities.

On the fifth issue of the legal effect arising from the Appellants’ act of registering a college in the College's name but with a different constitution, the appellate court was unable to agree with Prakash J's holding that the Appellants had created a new entity because they could not show that they had followed the amending provisions in the Constitution, which require the assent of at least two-thirds of the board at an annual general meeting, to make any amendment. As the principle that any purported amendment of an association's constitution by its members that does not follow the prescribed procedure is void is well settled, it should only mean that the act of registering the College with the new constitution was wrongful and perhaps the registration is a nullity.

The appellate court noted that the Appellants had only used a new constitution to effect the registration of FEBC as a charity as they could not find a copy of the (original) Constitution. While the Appellants could have amended the Constitution as the Board members were all before the Court as Appellants, the Judges of Appeal were of the view that the Appellants’ subjective and objective intentions were clearly to register the College as a charity and not to create a new entity. This is because they had informed the Commissioner of Charities that the college they were registering was formed in 1962 and they had submitted to him the College's audited accounts for the years 2000, 2001 and 2002 as part of the application form to register the College.

Notwithstanding that the Court of Appeal does not share the High Court Judge's view that the 2004 College was a different entity from the College, the Judges of Appeal went on to discuss if the change in doctrine by the FEBC is so fundamental that it ceases to be entitled to use the Premises. The appellate court looked to precedents from other jurisdictions for guidance.

While it is clear from the principles established in the cases that it is a breach of trust/gift for the members of a religious institution to deviate from the purpose of that trust/gift, the mere fact that the members of that religious institution have deviated from the original doctrines and practices of that institution does not ipso facto amount to a breach of the purposes of the trust/gift as the deviation must be material and relate to a “fundamental and essential” doctrine/practice of that institution: see Craigdallie v Aikman (1813) 1 Dow 1, HL (Scot) and Craigdallie v Aikman (No 2) (1820) 2 Bli 529, HL (Scot) (“Craigdallie”) and General Assembly of Free Church of Scotland v Lord Overtoun [1904] AC 515 ("Overtoun") (also known as Bannatyne v Overtoun [1904] AC515). In Craigdallie, the addition of a preamble to provide an explanation to a formula for the admission of members into the congregation of a church was found not to create any “intelligible” difference with the original doctrines/practices of the congregation.

Neither party adduced expert evidence on the question of the compatibility of the VPP doctrine with the Westminster Confession of Faith (the “Westminster Confession”) other than the expert opinions of the pastors of the various churches who adhered to the Westminster Confession. Notwithstanding the absence of such evidence (at trial in the High Court), the Court of Appeal – which took into account the fundamental doctrine of the College is the Confession of Faith – applied the rule of judicial notice by taking cognisance of the well-known fact that the Confession of Faith “has been highly influential within Presbyterian churches worldwide, many of which use it as a standard of doctrine that is second only to the teaching contained within the Bible itself” to look into the relevant part of the Westminster Confession at Article VIII Ch 1 which reads as follows:

“The Old Testament in Hebrew (which was the native language of the people of God of old), and the New Testament in Greek (which, at the time of the writing of it, was most generally known to the nations), being immediately inspired by God, and, by His singular care and providence, kept pure in all ages, are therefore authentical; so as, in all controversies of religion, the Church is finally to appeal unto them. But, because these original tongues are not known to all the people of God, who have right unto, and interest in the Scriptures, and are commanded, in the fear of God, to read and search them, therefore they are to be translated in to the vulgar language of every nation unto which they come, that, the Word of God dwelling plentifully in all, they may worship Him in an acceptable manner; and through patience and comfort of the Scriptures, may have hope.”

Pursuant to the principles laid down in Overtoun that the question of whether a certain doctrine is in accord with the fundamental doctrines of a religious institution is purely a question of construction, the Court of Appeal went on to hold that (i) “the VPP doctrine is actually closely related to the VPI doctrine which both parties [i.e., FEBC and the Church] adhere to,” (rejecting in [59] of the Court of Appeal Judgement the Church's contention that it is “an entirely different creature from the VPI doctrine");”(ii) “the College, in adopting the VPP doctrine, has not deviated from the fundamental principles which guide and inform the work of the College right from its inception, and as expressed in the Westminster Confession”; (iii) [i]t is not inconsistent for a Christian who believes fully in the principles contained within the Westminster Confession (and the VPI [Verbal Plenary Inspiration] doctrine) to also subscribe to the VPP doctrine”; and (iv) “[i]n the absence of anything in the Westminster Confession that deals with the status of the apographs, we [the Judges of Appeal] hesitate to find that the VPP doctrine is a deviation from the principles contained within the Westminster Confession.”

The appellate court held that the Respondents (who, importantly, bear the burden of proof) have not shown that the Appellant's adoption of the VPP doctrine is inconsistent with the fundamental doctrines of the College. The appellate court further held that the College's status as a beneficiary under the purpose trust over the Premises was not conditioned on its continued doctrinal alignment with the Church.

The appellate court also endorsed the non zero-sum approach adopted by the English Court in Varsani v Jesani [1999] Ch 219 (“Varsani”) in exercising its power under s 13(1)(e)(iii) of the Charities Act 1993 (UK / England and Wales) to resolve a religious dispute between two groups of followers of a Hindu sect, each claiming to be adhering to the true faith, and it was not possible to determine which group had departed from the fundamental tenets of the faith. A cy-pres scheme was settled in Varsani so that the sect's property was not appropriated to one group to the exclusion of the other as this would be contrary to the spirit in which the gift was made.

Varsani confirms the widening or modernisation of the cy-pres doctrine under the English Charities Act 1960, the precursor to the English Charities Act 1993. In Varsani, “the court accepted that under the law as it stood before 1960 [i.e., before the Charities Act 1960] it could not have made a scheme: ‘It could not be said that it was either impossible or impractical to carry out the purposes of the charity so long as either or both of the groups professed the faith … If either group continued to profess the faith then there would be no jurisdiction to make a cy-pres scheme’ (per Morritt LJ at 282). However, the Court of Appeal approved a scheme under s 13(1)(e)(iii) [of the English Charities Act 1993] whereby the funds were divided between the majority and minority groups. Chadwick LJ summarised the position (at 288): ‘The original purposes specified in the declaration of trust … are no longer a suitable and effective method of using the property … because the community is now divided and cannot worship together … Nothing that the court may decide will alter that. To appropriate the use of the property to the one group to the exclusion of the other would be contrary to the spirit in which the gift was made.’”

Other than the words "appropriate considerations" in the 1993 Act replacing "spirit of the gift" in the 1960 Act, s13(1)(e)(iii) of the English Charities Act 1993 remained the same as its counterpart in the English Charities Act 1960: “ceased in any other way to provide a suitable and effective method of using the property available by virtue of the gift, regard being had to the appropriate considerations” in the 1993 Act compared with “ceased in any other way to provide a suitable and effective method of using the property available by virtue of the gift, regard being had to the spirit of the gift” in the 1960 Act. S 13(1A) of the 1993 Act goes on to explain that “the appropriate considerations” in s 13(1) means (a) (on the one hand) the spirit of the gift concerned, and (b) (on the other) the social and economic circumstances prevailing at the time of the proposed alteration of the original purposes. (The current charities legislation of England and Wales is the Charities Act 2011 which came into force on 14 March 2012, with s62 in the 2011 Act reflecting the provisions of s13 in the 1993 Act.)

As s 13(1)(e)(iii) of the English Charities Act 1993 (or, more accurately, the English Charities Act 1960 with "spirit of the gift" at the end) is in pari materia with s 21(1)(e)(iii) of the Singapore Charities Act (which has "spirit of the gift" at the end), the Judges of Appeal affirmed that it is within the power of the Singapore court to adopt the approach advanced in Varsani to settle a cy-pres scheme without inquiring into whether there has been a departure from the fundamental tenets of the faith where the original purposes of the gift had ‘ceased in any other way to provide a suitable and effective method of using the property available by virtue of the gift, regard being had to the appropriate considerations.’

In the case here, however, the Singapore appellate court found that the College has not deviated from its fundamental doctrines/tenet and is entitled to continue using the Premises. As in Varsani where it was ruled that the courts could still make a cy-pres scheme under the widened cy-pres doctrine in s 13(1)(e)(iii) of the English Charities Act even if a disputing party was carrying out the purposes of the charity, as the College here is doing, a scheme was finally settled (see below in "Supplementary Judgement") as s 21(1)(e)(iii) of the Singapore Charities Act is in pari materia with s 13(1)(e)(iii) of the English Charities Act (see above).

For the reasons stated, the Judges of Appeal allowed the appeal and indicated that they would hear the parties on the exact orders which are necessary to give effect to the relief claimed by the Appellants for the College to remain and operate on the Premises. In order to avoid further controversies, the appellate court indicated that the parties may consider it necessary to draw up a more detailed arrangement than that set out in the 1970 Agreement as to how the Premises are to be maintained and used by the parties. The parties were also requested, within the next fortnight of the judgment, to let the Court have their written submissions on the question of costs of the appeal and the trial below.

For the costs order made against the Church, it paid to the College on 17 December 2014 a sum of $75,000 for the costs of the appeal and (in 2011) a sum of $188,519 for the costs and disbursements in respect of the trial below (i.e., the High Court trial which was held from 25 to 29 January 2010).

== Supplementary Judgment ==
On 25 July 2012, after the parties had appeared before the Judges of Appeal on 11 April 2012 following an unsuccessful attempt to mutually agree on the terms of a scheme (the “Scheme”) as to how the Premises are to be maintained and used by the College and the Church, Chao Hick Tin JA delivered a supplementary judgment [2012] SGCA 37 to designate a High Court judge to draw up the Scheme to:

(a) equitably cater to the present and reasonably foreseeable future needs of the Church and the College without unfairly subordinating the interests of one institution to the interests of the other;

(b) fairly apportion the obligations and responsibilities pertaining to the maintenance, upkeep and upgrading of the Premises between the Church and the College;

(c) prevent or reduce the incidence of disputes concerning the use/occupation and maintenance of the Premises; and

(d) devise a resolution process to determine operational issues that may arise from time to time.

Prakash J was designated to draw up the Scheme and she visited the Premises on 23 January 2014.

== Aftermath ==
The Scheme was completed and finalised on 27 November 2014 with certain areas in 9/9A and 10 Gilstead Road allocated for the exclusive use of the Church and certain areas allocated for the exclusive use of the College while other areas were designated for shared use by both parties and with the periods for each to use them fully defined. FEBC was allotted 1,811.88 sqm of space in the Premises for its exclusive use whereas the Church was allotted 1,999.72 sqm for its exclusive use. The details of the Scheme can be found in FEBC's semi-annual theological journal, The Burning Bush, July 2015, Volume 21, Number 2, pp. 83–91.

Notwithstanding, potential flashpoints or conflict remain.

== Citations ==
The case was cited in: Tan Kim Hock Anthony v. Public Prosecutor and another appeal [2014] SGHC 32, Chee Hock Keng v. Chu Sheng Temple [2015] SGHC 192, Zhao Hui Fang and others v Commissioner of Stamp Duties [2017] SGHC 105, Lian Chee Kek Buddhist Temple v Ong Ai Moi and others [2023] SGHC 172, and DHS v NUHS Fund Ltd [2023] SGHC 336.
