= Book of Nathan the Prophet =

Lost biblical text

The Book of Nathan the Prophet and the History of Nathan the Prophet (Hebrew: דברי נתן הנביא, romanized: diḇrê Nāṯān ha-nāḇî) are among the lost books quoted in the Bible, attributed to the biblical prophet Nathan. They may be the same text, but they are sometimes distinguished from one another. No such text is found anywhere in the Hebrew Bible, so it is presumed to have been lost or removed from earlier texts.

== Description ==
This text is sometimes called Nathan the Prophet or The Acts of Nathan the Prophet. It is distinguished from a similar text referenced in 2 Chronicles, the History of Nathan the Prophet, which may both refer to the same text.

=== Biblical references ===
The Book is described at 1 Chronicles 29:29:

"Now the acts of David the king, first and last, behold, they are written in the book of Samuel the seer, and in the book of Nathan the prophet, and in the book of Gad the seer."

The History is described in 2 Chronicles 9:29:

"Now the rest of the acts of Solomon, first and last, are they not written in the history of Nathan the prophet, and in the prophecy of Ahijah the Shilonite, and in the visions of Iddo the seer against Jeroboam the son of Nebat?"

These writings of Nathan and Gad may have been included in 1 and 2 Samuel.

== See also ==
- Table of books of Judeo-Christian Scripture
- Non-canonical books referenced in the Bible
- Lost books of the New Testament
- Lost work
