= Annals of King David =

The Annals of King David (Hebrew: הימים למלך דויד, romanized: hayyāmîm lammeleḵ Dāwîḏ, alternatively translated as the Chronicles of King David) is a lost work mentioned in the Hebrew Bible.

It may have been written by the Biblical prophet Nathan, who was one of King David's contemporaries.

== Quotation ==
Joab son of Zeruiah began to count the men but did not finish. Wrath came on Israel on account of this numbering, and the number was not entered in the book of the annals of King David.

— 1 Chronicles 27:24
