= Non-canonical books referenced in the Bible =

The non-canonical books referenced in the Bible include known, unknown, or otherwise lost non-Biblical cultures' works referenced in the Bible. The Bible, in Judaism, consists of the Hebrew Bible; Christianity refers to the Hebrew Bible as the Old Testament, with a canon including the New Testament. Non-canonical books referenced in the Bible include the Biblical apocrypha and Deuterocanon.

It may also include books of the Anagignoskomena (Deuterocanonical books § In Eastern Orthodoxy) that are accepted in only Eastern Orthodoxy. For the purposes of this article, "referenced" can mean direct quotations, paraphrases, or allusions, which in some cases are known only because they have been identified as such by ancient writers or the citation of a work or author.

== Hebrew Bible ==
The following are mentioned in the Hebrew Bible:

Israelite books quoted or alluded to are:

- The Book of Jasher is mentioned in Joshua 10:13 and 2 Samuel 1:18 and also possibly referenced in the Septuagint rendition of 1 Kings 8:53. From the context in the Book of Samuel, it is implied that it was a collection of poetry. Several books have claimed to be this lost text, some of which are discounted as pseudepigrapha. Certain members of the Church of Jesus Christ of Latter-day Saints secured the copyright to a particular English translation of one of these and republished it in 1887 in Salt Lake City.
- The Book of the Wars of the Lord is mentioned in Numbers 21:14. The Book of the Wars of the Lord is also cited in the Medieval Book of Jasher (translated by Moses Samuel c. 1840, edited by J. H. Parry 1887) (separate from the above Book of Jasher) chapter 90:48 as being a collaborative record written by Moses, Joshua and the children of Israel.
- The Chronicles of the Kings of Israel and Chronicles of the Kings of Judah are mentioned in the Books of Kings (1 Kings 14:19, 29). They are said to tell of events during the reigns of Kings Jeroboam of Israel and Rehoboam of Judah, respectively. The Chronicles of the Kings of Israel is again mentioned in 1 Kings 16:20 regarding King Zimri, and both books are mentioned no less than 30 other times throughout 1 and 2 Kings.
- The Book of Shemaiah the Prophet and Story of the Prophet Iddo (also called Visions of Iddo the Seer or The Annals of the Prophet Iddo) are mentioned in 2 Chronicles 9:29, 12:15, 13:22. This book has been completely lost to history, save for its title.
- The Manner of the Kingdom (also called The Book of Statutes or 3 Samuel); referenced in 1 Samuel 10:25.
- The Acts of Solomon; referenced in 1 Kings 11:41.
- The Annals of King David (also called The Book of the Annals of King David or The Chronicles of King David, which could be a reference to the rest of 1 Chronicles); referenced in 1 Chronicles 27:24.
- The Book of Samuel the Seer (also called Samuel the Seer or The Acts of Samuel the Seer, which could be the same as 1 and 2 Samuel); referenced in 1 Chronicles 29:29.
- The Book of Nathan the Prophet (also called Nathan the Prophet, The Acts of Nathan the Prophet or History of Nathan the Prophet); referenced in 1 Chronicles 29:29, and also 2 Chronicles 9:29.
- The Book of Gad the Seer (also called Gad the Seer or The Acts of Gad the Seer); referenced in 1 Chronicles 29:29.
- The Prophecy of Ahijah (also called The Prophesy of Ahijah the Shilonite, which may be a reference to 1 Kings 14:2–18); referenced in 1 Chronicles 29:29.
- The Book of the Kings of Judah and Israel (also called The Book of the Kings of Israel and Judah); referenced in 2 Chronicles 16:11, 2 Chronicles 27:7 and 2 Chronicles 32:32. May be the same as 1 and 2 Kings.
- The Book of Jehu (also called The Book of Jehu the son of Hanani) could be a reference to 1 Kings 16:1–7. Referenced in 2 Chronicles 20:34.
- The Story of the Book of Kings (also called Midrash on the Book of Kings); referenced in 2 Chronicles 24:27.
- The Acts of Uzziah (also called The Book by the prophet Isaiah); perhaps the same as the Book of Isaiah. Referenced in 2 Chronicles 26:22.
- The Vision of Isaiah (also called The Vision of the Prophet Isaiah); may be identical to the pseudepigraphal Ascension of Isaiah, and may also refer to the existing Book of Isaiah. Referenced in 2 Chronicles 32:32.
- The Acts of the Kings of Israel (also called The Acts and Prayers of Manasseh); may be identical to The Book of the Kings of Israel. Referenced in 2 Chronicles 33:18.
- The Sayings of the Seers (also called The Acts of the Seers); referenced in 2 Chronicles 33:19.
- The Laments for Josiah (also called Lamentations). This event is recorded in the existing Book of Lamentations, referenced in 2 Chronicles 35:25.
- The Chronicles of King Ahasuerus (also called The Book of Records of the Chronicles or The Book of the Chronicles of the Kings of Media and Persia); referenced in Esther 2:23, 6:1, 10:2, and Nehemiah 12:23.

Egyptian books quoted or alluded to are:

- Instruction of Amenemope; referenced in Proverbs 22:17–29 and 23:1–12.

== Deuterocanon / Apocrypha ==
Aramaic books quoted or alluded to are:

- Book (or Wisdom) of Ahikar; referenced in Tobit 1:22, 2:10, 11:18, and 14:10.

Greek books quoted or alluded to are:

- Aesop's fable of The Two Pots; referenced in Sirach 13:2–3.
- "five books by Jason of Cyrene" referenced in 2 Maccabees 2:23: the author of 2 Maccabees here states that their work is abridged from the history by Jason.
- "letters of the kings" referenced in 2 Maccabees 2:13.
- "the king's letter" referenced in 2 Maccabees 11:22.

Egyptian books quoted or alluded to are:

- The Egyptian Satire of the Trades, or another work in that tradition referenced in Sirach 38:24–39:11.

Israelite books quoted or alluded to are:

- Annals of John Hyrcanus referenced in 1 Maccabees 16:23–24.
- "The archives" referenced in 2 Maccabees 2:1.
- Memoirs of Nehemiah referenced in 2 Maccabees 2:13, which may be the same as the Book of Nehemiah.

== New Testament ==
Mennonite scholar David Ewart has mentioned that Nestle's Greek New Testament lists some 132 New Testament passages that appear to be verbal allusions to paracanonical books.

Israelite books quoted or alluded to are:

- Book of Enoch (Jude 1:4, 6, 13, 14–15, 2 Peter 2:4 and 3:13, and John 7:38).
- Book of Jubilees (Matthew 26:52); "For this reason it was ordained on the heavenly tablets; the instrument with which a man kills his neighbor with the same shall he be killed." Not a word for word quote. May have been a common colloquialism. However, Jubilees interprets this as an extension of the law give in Exodus 21:23.
- Life of Adam and Eve (2 Corinthians 11:14, "Satan as an angel of light", and 12:2, "Third Heaven").
- A lost section of the Assumption of Moses (Jude 1:9 "Michael... body of Moses").
- Ascension of Isaiah (Hebrews 11:37, "they were sawn in two").
- An unknown messianic prophecy possibly from a non-canonical source, quoted in Matthew 2:23 that states "he will be called a Nazorian" (ὅτι Ναζωραῖος κληθήσεται). "Nazorian" is typically rendered as "Nazarene" ("from Nazareth"), as in Acts 24:5, where Christians are referred to as "the sect of the Nazorians/Nazarenes" (τῶν Ναζωραίων αἱρέσεως). This is speculated to be a vague allusion to a quote about Samson in Judges 13:5 that uses a similar-sounding word: "the child shall be a Nazirite" (ναζιρ).
- An unknown version of Genesis (possibly a targum, midrash or other commentary), quoted by Paul in 1 Corinthians 15:45, as a reference to Christ's being "the Last Adam who became a life-giving spirit" (οὕτως καὶ γέγραπται· Ἐγένετο ὁ πρῶτος ἄνθρωπος Ἀδὰμ εἰς ψυχὴν ζῶσαν· ὁ ἔσχατος Ἀδὰμ εἰς πνεῦμα ζῳοποιοῦν). It has been speculated that Paul is simply paraphrasing Genesis 2:7, but there is no clear indication that this is not a complete quote.
- An unknown text quoted by Paul in 1 Corinthians 2:9, suggested by Origen to be a lost apocryphal book: "But as it is written, 'No eye has seen, no ear has heard, and no mind has imagined the things that God has prepared for those who love him." This may also be an allusion to the similar Isaiah 64:4, "For from days of old they have not heard or perceived by ear, nor has the eye seen a God besides You, Who acts in behalf of the one who waits for Him.'"
- An unknown messianic prophecy, possibly from a non-canonical source, quoted in Luke 24:46, speculated to be a vague allusion to Hosea 6:2: "Thus it is written, and thus it behoved Christ to suffer, and to rise from the dead the third day."
- An unknown messianic prophecy, possibly from a non-canonical source, quoted in Mark 9:12, speculated to be a vague allusion to Isaiah 53: "and how it is written of the Son of man, that he must suffer many things, and be set at nought."

Greek books quoted or alluded to are:

- Paul's letter to the Corinthians before 1 Corinthians (1 Corinthians 5:9, "I wrote to you in my letter...")
- Paul's letter to the Ephesians before Ephesians (Ephesians 3:3, "As I wrote afore in few words..."); this is disputed as many translations of the Greek term προγράφω ("to write before[hand]") interpret it as referring to what has been written earlier in Ephesians itself.
- Epistle to the Laodiceans (Colossians 4:16, "read the epistle from Laodicea").
- Apocryphon of Jannes and Jambres, according to Origen (2 Timothy 3:8 "... as Jannes and Jambres withstood Moses").
- Menander's Thais 218, quoting Euripides, "Evil company corrupts good habits" (1 Corinthians 15:33).
- Epimenides' Cretica 1, (Titus 1:12–13 where Paul introduces Epimenides as "a prophet of the Cretans"; see Epimenides paradox).
- Aratus' Phaenomena 5, (Acts 17:28, where Paul refers to the words of "some of your own poets").

== See also ==
- Agrapha
- Biblical apocrypha
- Biblical canon
- Jewish apocrypha
- List of Gospels
- List of names for the biblical nameless
- List of Old Testament pseudepigrapha
- New Testament apocrypha
