= Acts of Uzziah =

The Acts of Uzziah (Hebrew: דברי עזיהו, romanized: diḇrê ‘Uzzîyāhū) is a lost text that may have been written by Isaiah, who was one of King Uzziah's contemporaries. The book is described in 2 Chronicles 26:22. The passage reads: "Now the rest of the acts of Uzziah, first and last, did Isaiah the prophet, the son of Amoz, write."

This manuscript is sometimes called Second Isaiah or The Book by the prophet Isaiah.

== See also ==
- Table of books of Judeo-Christian Scripture
- Lost books of the New Testament
- Lost work
