= Life Bible-Presbyterian Church =

Coordinates: 1.3156°N 103.8382°E

Life Bible-Presbyterian Church 笃信圣经长老会生命堂
- Life Bible-Presbyterian Church 笃信圣经长老会生命堂
- Location: 9 Gilstead Road
- Country: Singapore
- Denomination: Bible-Presbyterian churches (Singapore)
- Website: www.lifebpc.com

History
- Founded: 15 October 1950
- Founder: Rev Dr Timothy Tow

Architecture
- Architect(s): Ang Kheng Leng & Associates
- Style: New Classical
- Groundbreaking: 1960
- Completed: 1962
- Construction cost: SGD 500,000

Clergy
- Pastor: Rev Charles Seet

Life Bible-Presbyterian Church (Abbreviation: LBPC; Chinese: 笃信圣经长老会生命堂) is a reformed, fundamental, and separatist Bible-Presbyterian church located at Gilstead Road, under the Novena Planning Area, within the Central Region of Singapore. It is the first and oldest Bible-Presbyterian church in Singapore and Southeast Asia, and the mother church of Bible-Presbyterian churches in the region. Church members are referred to as "Lifers." The pastor is the Rev Charles Seet.

The church motto is "Holding Forth the Word of Life" (Philippians 2:16).

== History ==
Life Bible-Presbyterian Church ("LBPC") was established by Timothy Tow, who in 1950 became pastor of the Life Church English Service at Say Mia Tng a Chinese Presbyterian Church at Prinsep Street (not to be confused with Prinsep Street Presbyterian Church). In 1955 Tow and others left the Chinese Presbyterian Synod to form the Bible-Presbyterian Church and LBPC was established. In 1963, LBPC moved into new premises in 9 & 9A Gilstead Road. The acquisition of 10 Gilstead Road was completed on 30 April 1990.

In 1988, the Synod of the Bible-Presbyterian Church was dissolved, but LBPC and other Bible-Presbyterian churches continue to exist under their respective names.

In 1990, the church acquired Beulah House, a bungalow located across the road. The church had reportedly been seeking to purchase the property for several decades as a "potential expansion to the Church activities." On 10 February 1992, the church received approval from the authorities to use the building as a hostel. It was gazetted for conservation by the Urban Redevelopment Authority on 19 May 2003. The church later restored the building, which involved removing the alterations it had received, including its mezzanine flooring and the boarding up of its arches windows and floors, and reinstating and recovering its original features, such as its terrazzo flooring. Broken tiles were replaced by identical ones made in Vietnam. It was renamed the Beulah House by the church and serves as a venue for the church's "supplementary activities". The restoration project received the Urban Redevelopment Authority Architectural Heritage Award in 2009.

== Doctrine ==
Article 4.1 of LBPC's constitution states that the church's doctrine shall be in accordance with that system commonly called "the Reformed Faith" as expressed in the Confession of Faith” as set forth by the historic Westminster Assembly together with the Larger Catechism and the Shorter Catechism.

== Controversy ==
The Far Eastern Bible College ("FEBC") shares premises with LBPC, but it had a falling out with LBPC over Verbal Plenary Preservation (VPP). FEBC teaches that God has supernaturally preserved each and every one of His inspired Hebrew/Aramaic OT words and Greek NT words to the last jot and tittle so that God's people will always have in their possession His infallible and inerrant Word kept intact without the loss of any word, and that the infallible and inerrant words of Scripture are found in the faithfully preserved Traditional/Byzantine/Majority manuscripts and fully represented in the Printed and Received Text (or Textus Receptus) that underlie the Reformation Bibles best represented by the KJV, and not in the corrupted and rejected texts of Westcott and Hort that underlie the many modern versions of the English Bible like the NIV, NASV, ESV, RSV, TEV, CEV, TLB, etc., but the Board of Elders of LBPC disagrees.

== Lawsuits ==
LBPC wrote in its weekly of 13 July 2008 regarding “1 Corinthians 6 which teaches us not to take fellow Christians to court.” However, LBPC commenced two lawsuits against FEBC: (i) Suit 648 in the High Court of Singapore on 15 September 2008; and (ii) DC1956/2013R in the Subordinate Courts of Singapore (later renamed the State Courts of Singapore) on 27 June 2013.

Brutus Balan in a letter dated 30 January 2008, addressed to Seet and the Board of Elders of LBPC with a plea to them to avoid carrying out their legal threat to evict the College from the Gilstead Road premises, had concluded: “You [LBPC leaders] have the most inconsistent and contradictory position over this matter and yet the charge of heresy is thrown at FEBC. It has ceased to be a theological debate and has become personal. Now the legal threat to evict the college over your own inconsistent stand is heartless … The fiery darts of evil have struck deep the armor-less leadership. Isn't there any one in the Life BP church session with wisdom and understanding? Will not the silent church rise to wake the dead? God have mercy!” However, this did not stop LBPC from commencing Suit 648 in the High Court less than eight months later.

Seet and the Elders of LBPC had in January 2008 written to their church members in “Mark Them Which Cause Divisions” that “the mouths of heretics must be stopped” within the Gilstead Road premises from teaching VPP, which Seet and the Elders viewed to be heresy, “for the sake of protecting the flock of God from being influenced and infiltrated by their teaching.”

=== Suit 648 in the High Court ===
In Suit 648, LBPC sued the college directors, including Timothy Tow, over allegedly “deviant Bible teachings” in an attempt to force FEBC to leave the Gilstead Road premises. Bearing the burden of proof, LBPC however failed to adduce the requisite expert evidence to show that FEBC's adoption of the VPP doctrine is inconsistent with the fundamental doctrines of the College, viz. the Westminster Confession of Faith (“WCF”). The Court of Appeal of Singapore, the apex court in the Singapore legal system, looked at Article VIII Ch 1 in the WCF and – in overturning the High Court decision – ruled on 26 April 2011 that:

 (i) “the VPP doctrine is actually closely related to the VPI doctrine which both parties [i.e., FEBC and LBPC] adhere to,” (rejecting LBPC's contention in [59] of the Court of Appeal Judgement that it [i.e., the VPP doctrine] is “an entirely different creature from the VPI doctrine");”

 (ii)  “the College, in adopting the VPP doctrine, has not deviated from the fundamental principles which guide and inform the work of the College right from its inception, and as expressed in the Westminster Confession;”

 (iii) “[i]t is not inconsistent for a Christian who believes fully in the principles contained within the Westminster Confession (and the VPI [Verbal Plenary Inspiration] doctrine) to also subscribe to the VPP doctrine;” and

 (iv) “[i]n the absence of anything in the Westminster Confession that deals with the status of the apographs, we [the Court] hesitate to find that the VPP doctrine is a deviation from the principles contained within the Westminster Confession."

Despite expressing in “Mark Them Which Cause Divisions” about the need for “protecting the flock of God from being influenced and infiltrated by [FEBC's] teaching” (see above), LBPC did not take up FEBC's suggestion of 9 March 2012 made to the Court of Appeal, in accordance with the Abrahamic principle of Genesis 13:8–9, that the two parties be housed on separate land parcels – 9/9A Gilstead Road and 10 Gilstead Road (collectively, the “Premises”) – located on opposite sides of the road, with FEBC allowing LBPC to have the first pick.

After an unsuccessful attempt by the parties to mutually agree on a scheme (the “Scheme”) on how the Premises are to be maintained and used by the College and the Church, the parties appeared before the Court of Appeal on 11 April 2012 to make their submissions on the terms of the Scheme as well as the course to take to move forward. The appellate court in a Supplementary Judgment issued on 25 July 2012 ruled that a High Court judge be designated to further hear the parties and to conduct a detailed examination before drawing up the Scheme to set out the parties’ respective rights and obligations in relation to the use, occupation and maintenance of the Premises.

The Scheme was finalised on 27 November 2014 with certain areas in the Premises allocated for the exclusive use of LBPC and certain areas allocated for the exclusive use of FEBC while other areas were designated for shared use by both parties and with the periods for each to use them fully defined. FEBC was allotted 1,811.88 sqm of space in the Premises for its exclusive use whereas the Church was allotted 1,999.72 sqm for its exclusive use. The details of the Scheme can be found in FEBC's semi-annual theological journal, The Burning Bush, July 2015, vol. 21, Number 2, pp. 83–91.

For the costs order made against LBPC, it paid to FEBC on 17 December 2014 a sum of SGD75,000 for the costs of the appeal and in 2011 a sum of SGD188,519 for the costs and disbursements in respect of the trial below (i.e., the High Court trial which was held from 25 to 29 January 2010).

=== Suit DC1956/2013R in the State Courts ===
In Suit DC1956/2013R, LBPC sued FEBC over money, and not doctrine. After filing the Writ of Summons for the suit, LBPC claimed in their pastoral announcement on 14 July 2013 that FEBC had failed and refused to honour its commitment to pay for past maintenance and upkeep of the premises at 9&9A Gilstead Road after they [LBPC] had made many requests to FEBC and indicated their being prepared to accept the amount offered by FEBC as an amicable compromise. FEBC disputed this in True Life Bible-Presbyterian Church's weekly of 11 August 2013 by publishing that contrary to LBPC's “pastoral announcement,” there was no indication from LBPC that they intended to accept an “amicable compromise” and the letters from LBPC's lawyers dated 25 January 2013, 4 February 2013 and 12 March 2013, which "were not written in the form of a request, but a demand coupled with threats of legal action," contained no unambiguous or amicable offer "to accept the sum previously tendered.”

The “sum previously tendered” by FEBC was SGD225,000 and this was included in the sum of SGD250,000 claimed by LBPC in Suit DC1956/2013R as owing by FEBC for utilities and maintenance from March 1970 to May 2008 even though LBPC had on their own accord returned on 28 January 2008 all FEBC cheques totaling SGD225,000 for contributions to such expenses and advised FEBC not to tender any further cheques as they were prepared to let FEBC occupy the Premises “free of charge for this extended period."

LBPC's pastoral announcement gave as background and impression that because the Court of Appeal had on 26 April 2011 ruled (with the High Court here) that FEBC is separate and independent from LBPC, LBPC then requested FEBC to pay the sum claimed as FEBC's obligation to contribute towards the past maintenance and upkeep of the premises. But LBPC had already taken the view in 2008 that FEBC had become separate and independent from the church after its registration as a charity in January 2004 and the courts could also find FEBC not to be a ministry of the church but a separate charity from the outset. No amount was alleged or claimed as owing by FEBC to LBPC in Suit 648. In fact, LBPC returned “the sum previously tendered” on 28 January 2008 and advised FEBC not to tender any further cheques for maintenance expenses before commencing Suit 648 on 15 September 2008 to evict FEBC.

LBPC's pastoral announcement of 14 July 2013 also requested prayer (from the congregation) for the claim in Suit DC1956/2013R to be resolved expeditiously and amicably without the need for adjudication by the Courts, notwithstanding the filing of the Writ of Summons. However, the matter was not resolved expeditiously and amicably as it went to trial before LBPC requested amicable settlement when faced with the prospect of losing another lawsuit. (See details in "The Battle for the Bible: Chronology of Events II" in The Burning Bush, July 2015, Volume 21, Number 2, pp. 95–98.)

LBPC first rejected on 18 November 2013 FEBC's offer of a love gift of SGD350,000 made on 5 November 2013, based on “the higher law of Christian charity,” as full and final settlement of any and all claims by LBPC up to the date of the Scheme despite FEBC having received legal advice that it had strong grounds to resist the claim. Then, in efforts to have the parties resolve their dispute by alternative dispute resolution, the State Courts arranged for mediation in their Primary Dispute Resolution Centre with two District Judges (Ong Chin Rhu and Joyce Low) appointed as mediators. Despite FEBC offering at the first mediation meeting on 29 January 2014 to pay LBPC the sum of SGD250,000 sued for in Suit DC1956/2013R and, at the next two mediation meetings on 19 February 2014 and 6 March 2014, an additional sum of SGD5,000 per month until the implementation of the Scheme, as full and final settlement of all claims, LBPC rejected FEBC's offers so that the mediation process had to be terminated by the mediators for directions to be given regarding procedures to be followed and the setting down for trial of the matter to be adjudicated by the courts. (See details in "The Battle for the Bible: Chronology of Events II" in The Burning Bush, July 2015, Volume 21, Number 2, Events 23 November 2013, 29 January 2014, 19 February 2014 and 6 March 2014, pp. 95–96.)

Although LBPC sued for only SGD250,000, being restricted by the jurisdictional limit based on the venue or court (viz the State Courts in this instance) where the action was commenced, it was clear that LBPC had wanted much more than this sum. However, after a 2-day open court trial before District Judge Seah Chi Ling on 24–25 July 2014 when it became clear that FEBC would be able to successfully make a “no case to answer” submission (upon resumption of the court hearing), LBPC requested FEBC to make an offer for settlement which FEBC obliged even though it had viewed LBPC's claim to be devoid of any legal basis and FEBC's earlier offers of settlement (see above) had been rejected. FEBC responded with an offer of SGD300,000 on 8 August 2014 – lower than the SGD350,000 offered on 5 November 2013 (because of further legal costs incurred)—and this was accepted on 14 August 2014 despite LBPC threatening on 4 August 2014 to transfer the suit to the High Court to sue for a higher sum of SGD615,000, which action never materialised (although an application for transfer was filed on 8 August 2014) and the suit was finally discontinued on 21 January 2015. (See details in "The Battle for the Bible: Chronology of Events II" in The Burning Bush, July 2015, Volume 21, Number 2, pp. 95–98.)

On the termination of Suit DC1956/2013R, Seet wrote briefly, without any details, at the end of his pastoral message “Live At Peace With All Men” in LBPC's weekly of 4 January 2015: “Regarding what the church claimed from the college for using the premises, both parties have agreed to an out-of-court settlement. This concludes the maintenance suit amicably.” The brief statement here on the ending of Suit DC1956/2013R is understandable as Seet's pastoral announcement of 14 July 2013 before the lawsuit's commencement was rebutted by Jeffrey Khoo for inaccuracy without any rejoinder from Seet, and LBPC had also contradicted itself by letting its claim proceed to trial despite Seet asking in the pastoral announcement to pray that “[the] matter will be resolved expeditiously and amicably, without the need for adjudication by the Courts.” (See above.)

Seet had also in 2004 preached a sermon titled "Can Christians Sue One Another?" based on 1 Cor 6:1-8 and this was published as an article in the LBPC's weekly of 23 May 2004 with the conclusion that Christians should follow the example of the Lord Jesus Christ to absorb whatever grief or loss caused to them and not sue fellow Christians in secular courts. The apparent motivation for Seet's sermon and article was to pre-empt or deter those Lifers who had stood with Timothy Tow on the VPP doctrine from suing LBPC in the courts and staking their claim to the Gilstead Road premises as Tow had started a new church, True Life Bible-Presbyterian Church, by holding worship services in rented premises at the Regional English Language Centre (RELC) in Orange Grove Road. Seet's sermon and article boomeranged on him and dented his credibility and that of LBPC as they later commenced two lawsuits against FEBC: Suit 648 in the High Court and Suit DC1956/2013R in the Subordinate (later renamed State) Courts (see above).

== See also ==
- Khoo Jeffrey and others v Life Bible-Presbyterian Church and others
- Bible-Presbyterian churches (Singapore)
