= Apographa =

Apographa refers to established copies or transcripts of certain texts, usually religious or ecclesiastical, rather than the original autographs by the original authors or writers.

== Issues ==
There are scholars and theologians who consider only the original autographs of Scripture as infallible and as final authority, while others hold more to what is called the "Ecclesiastical Text" view, that Scripture canon is also authoritative in various renderings in later copies or manuscript traditions, or established "apo-grapha" (meaning "copied-writings"), and not just the original autographs alone. The reason being that the "original autographs" no longer actually exist, in tangible extant form, so later verified copies of copies, or "apographa", are the only real tangible or present "canon" that we have, and providentially preserved for current knowledge. And that the "apographa" or "Ecclesiastical Text" is all that is really available and should be mainly considered realistically, from established and accepted confessions, church traditions, revivals, productivity, understandings, and interpretations, and should be all that is accepted reasonably, efficiently, or sufficiently, for study or edification.

Regarding Westcott and Hort's work, according to Bible scholar and translator Bruce M. Metzger, "the general validity of their critical principles and procedures is widely acknowledged by scholars today."

== See also ==
- Textual criticism
- Verbal plenary preservation
