= Verbal plenary preservation =

Protestant theological doctrine

In Protestant theology, verbal plenary preservation (VPP) is a doctrine concerning the nature of the Bible. While verbal plenary inspiration (VPI) applies only to the original autographs of the Bible manuscript, VPP views that, "the whole of scripture with all its words even to the jot and tittle is perfectly preserved by God in the apographs without any loss of the original words, prophecies, promises, commandments, doctrines, and truths, not only in the words of salvation, but also the words of history, geography and science; and every book, every chapter, every verse, every word, every syllable, every letter is infallibly preserved by the Lord Himself to the last iota so that the Bible is not only infallible and inerrant in the past (in the autographs), but also infallible and inerrant today (in the apographs)."

== Basis ==
The doctrine of VPP is founded on God's promise in the Scripture to perfectly preserve his words and this is affirmed in the historical confessional statements of the Christian faith.

=== Scripture ===
"The words of the Lord are pure words: as silver tried in a furnace of earth, purified seven times. Thou shalt keep them, O LORD, thou shalt preserve them from this generation for ever" (Psalm 12:6-7). Those who deny that the Bible teaches preservation say that verse 7 here refers to the preservation of God's people, not His words.

The late Carl McIntire, the founding pastor of the historic Bible Presbyterian Church, understood verse 7 to mean preservation of the divinely inspired words of God as he had preached in 1992 a sermon entitled "Help, Lord!", from Psalm 12, saying:

"Now come verse 6, ‘The words of the LORD are pure words,’ not one of them is mistaken, ‘as silver tried in the furnace of earth, purified seven times.’ All the dregs are out. Here is a marvelous affirmation and vindication that God's Word is perfect. ... Now, ‘The words of the LORD are pure words.’ And then verse 7, how I love this: ‘Thou shalt keep them O LORD,’ that is, keep His words; ‘thou shalt preserve them from this generation forever.’ No matter what happens, one generation come and another passes away, God is going to preserve His words ... from one generation to another. The words of God will be preserved throughout all the generations.

Other Bible verses quoted to support divine preservation being verbal (words) and plenary (all, full, entire or complete) include the following:

- Psalm 105:8: "He hath remembered his covenant for ever, the word which he commanded to a thousand generations."
- Ecclesiastes 3:14: "l know that, whatsoever God doeth, it shall be for ever: nothing can be put to it, nor any thing taken from it: and God doeth it, that men should fear before him."
- Matthew 4:4: "But he answered and said, It is written, Man shall not live by bread alone, but by every word that proceedeth out of the mouth of God." (See also Luke 4:4 for similar verse.)
- Matthew 5:18: "For verily I say unto you, Till heaven and earth pass, one jot or one tittle shall in no wise pass from the law, till all be fulfilled.
- Matthew 24:35: "Heaven and earth shall pass away, but my words shall not pass away." (See also Mark 13:31 and Luke 21:33 for similar verses.)
- John 10:35: "If he called them gods, unto whom the word of God came, and the scripture cannot be broken."
- 1 Peter 1:25: "But the word of the Lord endureth for ever. And this is the word which by the gospel is preached unto you."

=== Confessional statements ===
The confessional statements supporting VPP include the following:

=== Westminster Confession of Faith (1643–1648) ===
The Old Testament in Hebrew (which was the native language of the people of God of old), and the New Testament in Greek (which, at the time of writing of it, was most generally known to the nations), being immediately inspired by God, and, by His singular care and providence, kept pure in all ages, are therefore authentical; so as, in all controversies of religion, the Church is finally to appeal unto them (Chapter 1:8)

The 1658 Savoy Declaration of Faith and Order, the 1677/1689 London Confession of Faith and the 1742 Philadelphia Confession of Faith all follow WCF 1:8.

=== Helvetic Consensus (1675) ===
God, the supreme Judge, not only took care to have His Word, which is the ‘power of God unto salvation to every one that believeth’ (Rom 1:16), committed to writing by Moses, the prophets, and the apostles, but has also watched and cherished it with paternal care ever since it was written up to the present time, so that it could not be corrupted by craft of Satan or fraud of man. Therefore, the church justly ascribes it to His singular grace and goodness that she has, and will have to the end of the world, a ‘sure word of prophecy’ (2 Pet 1:19) and ‘holy Scriptures’ (2 Tim 3:15), from which, though heaven and earth perish, ‘one jot or one tittle shall in no wise pass’ (Matt 5:18). (Canon I)

Like the Helvetic Consensus Formula, the Westminster Confession of Faith cites Matthew 5:18 as proof text of the special providential preservation of the divinely inspired Holy Scripture. The late Rev Dr Carl McIntire also understood Chapter 1 of the Westminster Confession of Faith to be teaching the special providential preservation of God's words when continuing from what was quoted above in his 1992 sermon entitled "Help, Lord!", from Psalm 12, he said with regard to verses 6 and 7:

Now I am very happy that in the great Confessions of the Christian world, our Confession—the Westminster Confession—has its Chapter 1 on the Word of God. ... Now the Lord says, "I am going to keep my Word—it is like silver that has been tried. I am going to keep that to all generations, all generations." That means that no matter what the conditions are, God is going to have on this earth some churches and some pastors until the last generation were taken away who will maintain this Word like we are doing here and like we are seeking to do throughout the whole Christian world.

== Views ==
=== Timothy Tow (Singapore) ===
On VPI and VPP Timothy Tow, founding pastor of the Bible-Presbyterian Church and founding principal of Far Eastern Bible College ("FEBC"), wrote: "We believe the preservation of Holy Scripture and its Divine inspiration stand in the same position as providence and creation. If Deism teaches a Creator who goes to sleep after creating the world is absurd, to hold to the doctrine of inspiration without preservation is equally illogical. ... Without preservation, all the inspiration, God-breathing into the Scriptures, would be lost. But we have a Bible so pure and powerful in every word and it is so because God has preserved it down through the ages."

=== Ian Paisley (Northern Ireland) ===
On the same twin doctrines Ian Paisley, moderator of the Ulster Free Presbyterian Church for more than 57 years, said: "The verbal Inspiration of the Scriptures demands the verbal Preservation of the Scriptures. Those who would deny the need for verbal Preservation cannot be accepted as committed to verbal Inspiration. If there is no preserved Word of God today then the work of Divine Revelation and Divine Inspiration has perished."

=== Edward F. Hills (U.S.) ===
Edward F. Hills also penned: "If the doctrine of divine inspiration of the Old and New Testament Scriptures is a true doctrine, the doctrine of the providential preservation of these Scriptures must also be a true doctrine. It must be that down through the centuries God has exercised a special, providential control over the copying of the Scriptures and the preservation and use of the copies, so that trustworthy representatives of the original text have been available to God's people in every age. God must have done this, for if He gave the Scriptures to His Church by inspiration as the perfect and final revelation of His will, then it is obvious that He would not allow this revelation to disappear or undergo any alteration of its fundamental character."

=== William Aberhart (Canada) ===
William Aberhart, pastor, high school principal, Bible school dean, radio Bible teacher and Premier of Alberta from 1935 to 1943, wrote in 1925: "I can still believe the Lord Jesus Christ, when he said: ‘For verily I say unto you, Till heaven and earth pass, one jot or one tittle shall in no wise pass from the law, till all be fulfilled’ (Matt. 5:18). ‘Heaven and earth shall pass away, but my words shall not pass away’ (Matt. 24:35). If these words mean anything, they inform us that the Lord Jesus intended to see to it that the Bible, His Word, would be preserved for us in a perfect, infallible state."

=== Others ===
More views upholding the doctrine of perfect preservation or VPP can be found quoted in "The Historic Views of the Church Concerning Preservation" by Rev (Dr) P. S. Ferguson. These views include those of English puritan Thomas Cartwright, William Whitaker, Bishop and Divine John Jewel, Cambridge-educated puritan preacher Nicholas Gibbens, German Lutheran dogmatician Johannes Andreas Quenstedt, English Presbyterian clergyman John Flavel, English puritan and theologian Edward Leigh (1602–1671), Puritan Thomas Watson, Puritan John Owen, first regent and first principal of the University of Edinburgh Robert Rollock, Swiss-Italian Reformed scholastic theologian Francis Turretin, Westminster divine Richard Capel, original member of the Westminster assembly John Lightfoot, Pastor Dr Jack Moorman, Professor Albert J. Hembd and the Rev N. Pffeifer.

== Identification of the Preserved Text ==
=== Garnet Howard Milne (New Zealand) ===
Garnet Howard Milne, who has served as pastor of two Reformed churches in Wainuiomata and Wanganui in New Zealand, in Has the Bible been kept pure? The Westminster Confession of Faith and the providential preservation of Scripture (2017) writes that Presbyterian William Jenkyn, who succeeded the distinguished Westminster divine William Gouge (1575–1653) at West Friars London, believed with Augustine and Whitaker that the “inspired words had been preserved and could be identified and that if they could not, they could have no assurance that they have the Word of God at all”.

Milne in the same book, after quoting Professor Whitaker at p. 328 Disputation on Holy Scripture (Cambridge: The University Press, 1849), says “the canon of Scriptures was confirmed and received individually throughout the centuries ever since God had dictated those Scriptures for the church” and this means “the common or received Greek text of the New Testament and the Masoretic text of the Old” which Whitaker sees as “the authentic texts of Scripture” and such a view precludes the possibility of discovering any ancient codex in the future that would recalibrate the Word of God with a fundamentally different text than the one “endorsed by the Holy Spirit in the multitude of believers”. Quoting pp. 165 & 117 Disputation on Holy Scripture, Milne says that Whitaker also believes in the very words of the text, and not merely the sense, to be important and “the church possessed the very words, and all the words of the Holy Spirit in the extant originals in his day”, i.e. the Hebrew and Greek texts or the apographa which “so closely reflected the autographs that ‘in one sense’ could be called ‘originals’”.

Milne goes on to say that the believing church has always taught God’s Word is locatable in the Masoretic text of the OT and the Greek common or majority text of the NT, which have not been hidden, and, where there are variants in the manuscripts, the church has not found it an onerous task to collate the texts and arrive at the authentic autographic text, the Holy Spirit confirming the divine authority of God’s Word in the hearts of His people down through the ages, while the lack of spiritual insight is possibly why those who are not or are less spiritually awakened have adopted without much thought or consideration translations based upon the critical texts and eclectic texts of Westcott and Hort and other modern textual critics.

=== Samuel Joseph (Singapore) ===
Samuel Joseph in The Preservation of God’s Inspired Words in the Holy Scriptures says that if God has promised to preserve His Word, and has in fact preserved it down to every jot and tittle according to His promise, the crucial question is whether He has told us where to find His Word today as there would be little point in saying that the preserved words of God are "somewhere out there", if we did not know where and had no way to find out; he goes on to say that the application of the principles codified into seven "biblical axioms" by Dr Jeffrey Khoo (The Burning Bush, July 2011, pp. 74–95) leads unmistakably to the Hebrew Masoretic text of the Old Testament and the Greek Textus Receptus of the New Testament being the Preserved Text.

=== Bible Presbyterian Church and School ===
The Bible Presbyterian Church of Collingswood, New Jersey state at 4. Bible Translations: “We believe that God literally and verbally inspired the text of the Bible in the original Hebrew and Greek manuscripts (including certain passages in Daniel and elsewhere, in Aramaic). We also believe that God has faithfully and accurately preserved this original text in the Masoretic Text (Old Testament) and the ‘Textus Receptus’ (New Testament), the ‘majority text’ manuscripts used to translate the King James Version of the Bible”.

The Faith Christian School, also in Collingswood, leaves no room for doubt about the school’s belief in VPI and VPP and where the autographic text can be found today in the school’s Statement of Faith at Inspiration: “We believe that ... the 66 canonical books of the Bible are alone the inspired, "God breathed", Word of God ... We believe that the inspiration of the Bible is plenary (inspiration extends to all parts of the Bible equally), verbal (inspiration extends to the words, letters, tenses and other parts of speech used in Scripture), ... inerrant (contains no factual error), infallible (never teaches error as truth although it records the sins and folly of man and reveals it as such), authoritative (is the final authority for the believer in all areas of faith and practice) and preserved today in the Hebrew and Greek Texts underlying the King James Version of the Bible, not merely in the original manuscripts.”

=== Thomas Ross and Kent Brandenburg / Bethel Baptist Church ===
Thomas Ross and Kent Brandenburg, both of Bethel Baptist Church in CA in the U.S., subscribe to VPI and VPP and identify where all of the inspired words can be found; they believe that “the Bible’s very words, and all of its words, are inspired, and that those very words, and all of those words, are perfectly and providentially preserved (that is, verbal, plenary inspiration and verbal, plenary preservation) in the Hebrew Masoretic Text and the Greek Textus Receptus (Received Text) that underlies the Authorized or King James Version of the Bible”.

=== Other persons and churches in the U.S. and the U.K. ===
Among the many persons and organisations cited by Paul Ferguson as pro-KJV and VPP – i.e., they accept that the perfectly preserved words of God in the Holy Scripture are the Hebrew Masoretic Text and the Greek Textus Receptus underlying the KJV – are (a) Clarence Sexton, Founder and President of Crown College of the Bible and Pastor of Temple Baptist Church in Powell, TN; (b) Lloyd Streeter, co-pastor (until his resignation) of Campus Church (click The Bible) of Pensacola Christian College; (c) the Free Presbyterian Church of Scotland; and (d) Ian Paisley, Founder of the Free Presbyterian Church of Ulster. In respect of (d), Ferguson says it is clear, from Paisley’s quoted words in pp. 102–3 and 106 of My Plea for the Old Sword: the English Authorised Version (KJV) (Belfast: Ambassador, 1997), that the “‘true Scriptures’ were only preserved in a ‘full, complete, perfect’ manner in the ‘true copies of the originals... at hand’”: Tyndale’s translation of God's Holy Word into English and the KJV were translated from the ‘Preserved Word of God’, not the ‘Perverted Word of God’, in the Hebrew Masoretic Text and the Greek Textus Receptus.

=== Trinitarian Bible Society England ===
The TBS in England “maintains that the providentially preserved true and authentic text is to be found in the Masoretic Hebrew and the Greek Received Texts” (bold and italic added) and in so doing, the society “follows the historic, orthodox Protestant position of acknowledging as Holy Scripture the Hebrew and Greek texts consistently accessible to and preserved among the people of God in all ages” (bold and italic added), these being the texts “in common use in different parts of the world for more than fifteen centuries” which “faithfully represent the texts used in New Testament times”. The society views that the doctrine of providential preservation teaches that the Church is - and always has been - in possession of the true text of Scripture; it rejects the Majority Text of Zane C. Hodges and Arthur L. Farstad (1982) which allows for the discovery of further manuscripts that could change minority readings to majority readings, or vice versa.

=== The International Council of Christian Churches ===
The ICCC, a worldwide fellowship of fundamental churches opposed to liberalism, ecumenism, charismatism and neo-evangelicalism, passed a resolution at Jerusalem in 2000, when McIntire was President, affirming the council's belief that the King James Version in English has been faithfully translated from the God-preserved Masoretic text for the O.T. and the Textus Receptus for the N.T., which texts combined gave the complete Word of God, the Holy Scripture, the originals fully inspired and without errors preserved in all ages for all eternity as the Westminster Confession of Faith standard says – “the O.T. in Hebrew and the N.T. in Greek... being immediately inspired by God and by His singular care and providence kept pure in all ages are therefore authentical ....”

== Neutral Arbiter of VPP ==
Although VPP is embraced in many countries in the world, the VPP issue was litigated for the first time before a neutral secular arbiter in Singapore.

=== FEBC on VPP ===
FEBC embraces the VPP doctrine based on WCF 1:8 (see Westminster Confession of Faith (1643-1648) above) and teaches that God has supernaturally preserved each and every one of His inspired Hebrew/Aramaic OT words and Greek NT words to the last jot and tittle so that God's people will always have in their possession His infallible and inerrant Word kept intact without the loss of any word, and that the infallible and inerrant words of Scripture are found in the faithfully preserved Traditional/Byzantine/Majority manuscripts and fully represented in the Printed and Received Text (or Textus Receptus) that underlie the Reformation Bibles best represented by the KJV, and NOT in the corrupted and rejected texts of Westcott and Hort that underlie the many modern versions of the English Bible like the NIV, NASV, ESV, RSV, TEV, CEV, TLB, etc.

=== Disagreement of Life Bible-Presbyterian Church with FEBC on VPP ===
The Board of Elders (“BOE”) of Life BPC disagreed with FEBC and called VPP a “theory”. FEBC responded by asserting that VPP is a biblical doctrine.

The BOE of Life BPC issued in January 2008 their paper headed Mark Them Which Cause Divisions to declare the church’s non-VPP position and to require the FEBC to give a written unconditional undertaking that the college would not promote the VPP doctrine in its night classes or it would not be allowed to use the premises from that month onwards as the BOE viewed VPP to be a heresy because it is ‘new’, ‘infectious’ and ‘dangerous’. FEBC rebutted with Jeffrey Khoo’s response headed Making the Word of God of None Effect which argued that without a presently infallible and inerrant Word of God to the jot and tittle (Matt 5:18), the elders of Life BPC had no basis to condemn VPP as a heresy and VPP proponents as heretics.

Paul Ferguson chimed in with his paper which was also entitled Mark Them Which Cause Divisions to criticize Life BPC for misusing the word “heresy”, maligning godly men as “heretics”, displaying inconsistency and muddled up thinking on the VPP issue, totally misrepresenting the VPP position as a "new" concept, and showing poor scholarship and research in plagiarizing the views of anti-KJV and anti-Preservation writers.

Brutus Balan (now retired from pastoring Faith Baptist Church in Hobart, Tasmania) wrote a letter dated 30 January 2008 addressed to Charles Seet and the BOE of Life BPC with a plea to them to avoid carrying out their legal threat to evict the college from the Gilstead Road premises and remarking that Seet and the elders had the most inconsistent and contradictory position over the matter – saying the original writings (autographs) were ‘inerrant, infallible’ in the past and the ‘providentially preserved’ copies (apographs) today have errors and then claiming to hold to an ‘inerrant and infallible Bible and the full preservation of God’s holy Word’ with the use of ‘full’ being questionable for ‘not full’ preservation – but yet accused the FEBC of heresy. Balan’s plea and admonition failed to stop Life BPC from commencing Suit 648 in the High Court less than eight months later.

=== Court of Appeal's judgment on VPP ===
On 15 September 2008, the church sued the college's directors, including Timothy Tow (the church's founding pastor), over allegedly "deviant Bible teachings" to evict FEBC from the Gilstead Road premises shared by both parties. However, the church failed as the Court of Appeal, the apex court in Singapore's legal system (coram: Chao Hick Tin, Andrew Phang Boon Leong and V.K. Rajah JJ.A), ruled unanimously on 26 April 2011 – after examining WCF 1:8 – that:

1. "the VPP doctrine is actually closely related to the VPI doctrine which both parties [i.e., the College and the Church] adhere to,” (rejecting the Church's contention in [59] of the Court of Appeal Judgement that it is “an entirely different creature from the VPI doctrine)";”
2. "the College, in adopting the VPP doctrine, has not deviated from the fundamental principles which guide and inform the work of the College right from its inception, and as expressed in the Westminster Confession;"
3. "[i]t is not inconsistent for a Christian who believes fully in the principles contained within the Westminster Confession (and the VPI doctrine) to also subscribe to the VPP doctrine;" and
4. "[i]n the absence of anything in the Westminster Confession that deals with the status of the apographs, we [the Court] hesitate to find that the VPP doctrine is a deviation from the principles contained within the Westminster Confession."

The Court of Appeal at [94] of its judgment noted that adherents of the VPP doctrine believe that the KJV is the most accurate English translation of the Bible. Although Life BPC under Charles Seet as Pastor does not subscribe to the VPP doctrine, the Court of Appeal at [99] of its judgment noted that Seet had admitted during cross-examination (in the High Court) that Life BPC has always subscribed to the view that the KJV is the best English translation of the Bible because of its textual superiority [in the Hebrew Masoretic Text and the Greek Textus Receptus underlying the KJV]. (Life BPC’s use of the KJV has been entrenched as when Life BPC started as the English service of Say Mia Tng in 1950 with Timothy Tow as its founding pastor, he wanted the service that he founded and pastored to be a distinct Bible-believing church and to also stick to the KJV.)

== See also ==
- Bible code
- Biblical inerrancy
- Biblical literalism
- Bible-Presbyterian churches (Singapore)
- Khoo Jeffrey and others v Life Bible-Presbyterian Church and others
