= Nathan (prophet) =

Prophet in the Hebrew Bible

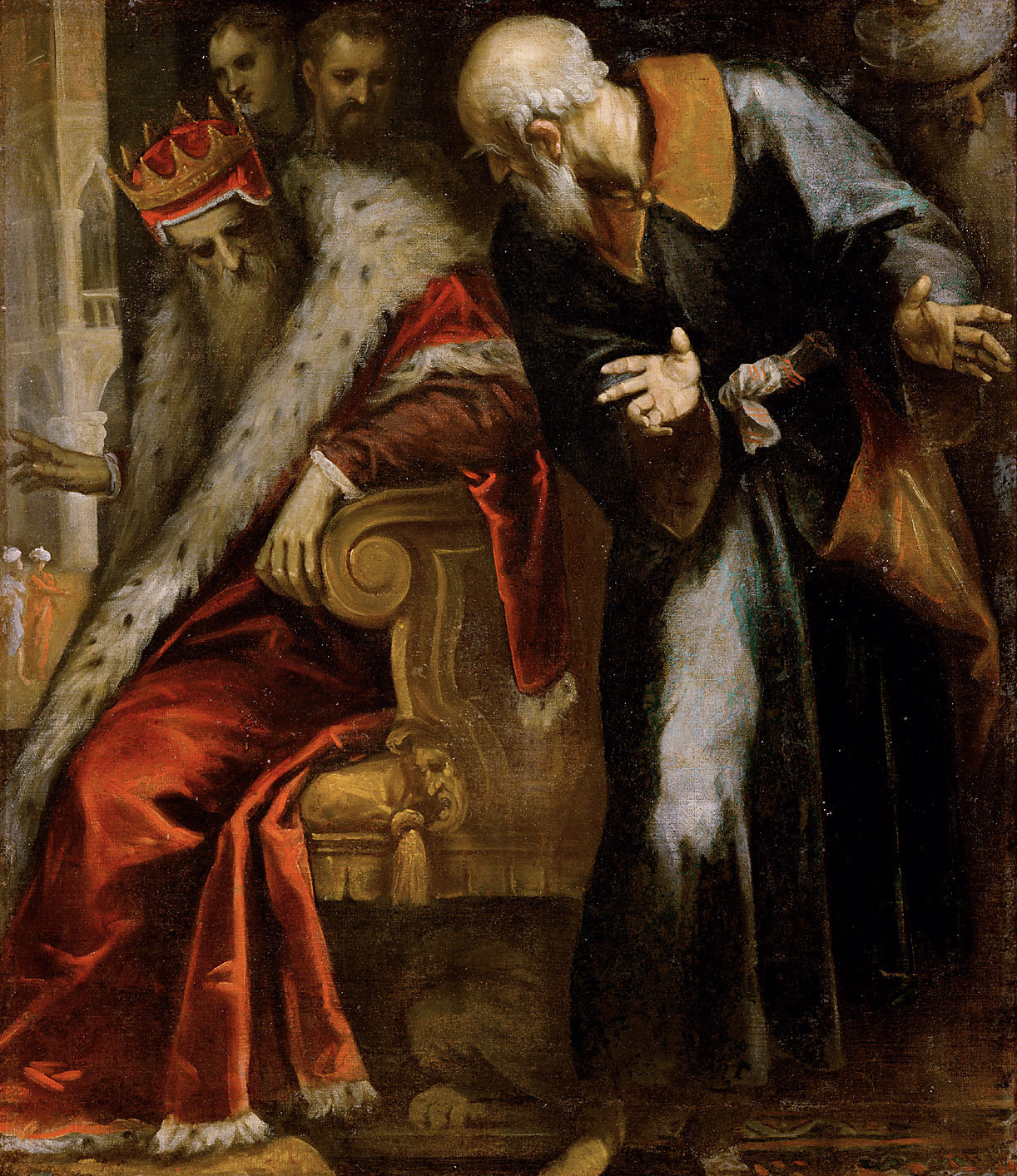
- The prophet Nathan admonishes King David by Palma il Giovane, 1600s

Prophet
- Honored in: Judaism; Islam; Protestant Church; Eastern Orthodox Church; Roman Catholic Church
- Feast: Sunday of the Holy Forefathers

Nathan (Hebrew: נָתָן Nāṯān 'given'; fl. c. 1000 BC) is a prophet in the Hebrew Bible. His actions are described in the Books of Samuel, Kings, and Chronicles (especially 2 Samuel 7:2–17, 12:1–25).

== Biblical accounts ==
Nathan was a court prophet in the time of King David. He is introduced in 2 Samuel 7:2 and 1 Chronicles 17:1 as an advisor to David, with whom David reflects on the contrast between his own comfortable home and the tent in which the Ark of the Covenant is accommodated. Nathan then announces to David the covenant God was making with him (2 Samuel 7:4–17, a passage known as Nathan's Oracle), contrasting David's proposal to build a house (i.e. a building) for the Ark with God's plan to build a house (i.e. a dynasty) for David. Later, he comes to David to reprimand him for committing adultery with Bathsheba while she was the wife of Uriah the Hittite, whose death the King had also arranged to hide his previous transgression (2 Samuel 12:7–14).

According to Chronicles, Nathan wrote histories of the reigns of both David (1 Chronicles 29:29) and Solomon (2 Chronicles 9:29), and was involved in the music of the temple (see 2 Chronicles 29:25).

In 1 Kings 1:8–45 it is Nathan who tells the dying David of the plot of Adonijah to become king, resulting in Solomon being proclaimed king instead. Nathan presides at the anointing of King Solomon. The Midrash teaches that two honorary seats flanked the throne of King Solomon, one for Nathan and the other for Gad the Seer.

A lost Book of Nathan the Prophet is mentioned in 1 and 2 Chronicles. Although the work appears to have been lost, some speculate that some of its content have been incorporated into the books of Samuel or Kings. The 15th century Jewish scholar, Isaac Abarbanel, proposed that Samuel started his book, but Nathan completed the work.

David had promised the succession to Solomon, his son by Bath-sheba. Nathan advises Bath-sheba to remonstrate with the king against the pretensions of Adonijah, promising to give timely confirmation to her words. The plan succeeds, and, by order of David, Nathan and Zadok the priest proclaim and anoint Solomon the successor to the throne (I Kings i. 5-39).

In addition to these passages, Nathan is mentioned in (1) II Sam. xii. 25, as giving to Solomon the name of Jedidiah ("friend of God"); (2) Ps. li. (in the title); (3) I Chron. xvii. 2-15, which is a repetition of II Sam. vii.; (4) I Chron. xxix. 29; and (5) II Chron. ix. 29. In the last two passages Nathan is named as the historian of the reigns of David and Solomon. He is not mentioned in Chronicles in connection with the Bath-sheba episode or with the anointment of Solomon. A grave at Halhul, near Hebron, is pointed out as that of Nathan, but this is doubtful. Two sons of Nathan, Azariah and Zabud, are mentioned as princes and officers under Solomon (I Kings iv. 5).

About Nathan the Rabbis are all silent, saving in but one passage, in which R. Judah remarks that the "threefold cord that is not easily broken" was the joint effort of Bath-sheba, David, and Nathan to save the throne for Solomon against Adonijah (Eccl. R. iv. 12). An echo of Nathan's parable of the rich man with many flocks and the poor man with but one lamb is found in both Christian (Bible Samuel 2 12:1-4) and Islamic tradition (Koran, sura xxxviii. 20-25).

== Feast day ==
In the Eastern Orthodox Church, and those Eastern Catholic Churches which follow the Byzantine Rite, he is commemorated as a saint on the Sunday of the Holy Fathers (i.e., the Sunday before the Great Feast of the Nativity of the Lord).

== As a name ==
Derived from this biblical character, "Nathan" is used as a male first name in various languages.

== See also ==
- Nathan (son of David)
