= Story of the Book of Kings =

The Story of the Book of Kings, also called the Midrash on the Book of Kings, is a lost work mentioned in the Bible. The book is found nowhere in the Old Testament, so it is presumed to have been lost or removed from the earlier texts.

The book is described in 2 Chronicles 24:27:

"Now concerning his sons, and the greatness of the burdens laid upon him, and the repairing of the house of God, behold, they are written in the story of the book of the kings. And Amaziah his son reigned in his stead."
