= Book of Gad the Seer =

Religious text

The Book of Gad the Seer (Hebrew: דברי גד החזה, romanized: diḇrê Gāḏ ha-ḥōzeh) is a presumed lost text, supposed to have been written by the biblical prophet Gad, which is mentioned at 1 Chronicles (1 Chronicles 29:29). The passage reads: "Now the acts of David the king, first and last, behold, they are written in the book of Samuel the seer, and in the book of Nathan the prophet, and in the book of Gad the seer."

Some traditional Rabbinic commentaries understood this to be a reference to the books of I and II Samuel which were started by Samuel himself and completed by Nathan the Prophet and Gad the Seer.

== Pseudepigraphic book of the same name ==
There is a pseudepigraphic book by the same title, extant in the form of a manuscript from the Jews of Cochin, India. The manuscript now in the Cambridge Library is a relatively recent (19th century) copy. According to Solomon Schechter, this manuscript was copied from a document purporting to be from Rome, and the late linguistic forms and features of the Hebrew manuscript, as well as its substantial similarity with some medieval Kabbalistic literature and some aspects of Christianity, indicate a relatively late date. He therefore regarded it as not dating back to antiquity. However, according to Professor Meir Bar Ilan, although some linguistic aspects of the Hebrew manuscript are of late date, there is evidence that the book originated in approximately the 1st or 2nd century A.D.

A scholarly edition of the book was published in August 2015, edited by Professor Meir Bar Ilan of Bar Ilan University. The book also includes an English translation of the original text. The work is included in the contemporary The 120-Book Holy Bible and Apocrypha Collection: Literal Standard Version (LSV).

== See also ==
- Lost work
- Non-canonical books referenced in the Bible
- Table of books of Judeo-Christian Scripture
