= Sayings of the Seers =

Lost text referenced in Genesis

The Sayings of the Seers (or Sayings of Hozai, Hebrew: דברי חוזי, romanized: diḇrê Ḥōzāy, in the Masoretic Text) is a lost text referred to in 2 Chronicles 33:19. Referring to Manasseh, king of Judah, the passage reads:

"His prayer also, and how God was intreated of him, and all his sin, and his trespass, and the places wherein he built high places, and set up groves and graven images, before he was humbled: behold, they are written among the sayings of the seers."

The Sayings of the Seers could be a source text, or else an indication to the reader of matter for "further reading".

== See also ==
- Table of books of Judeo-Christian Scripture
- Lost work
- Non-canonical books referenced in the Bible
