= Ahijah the Shilonite =

Biblical prophet

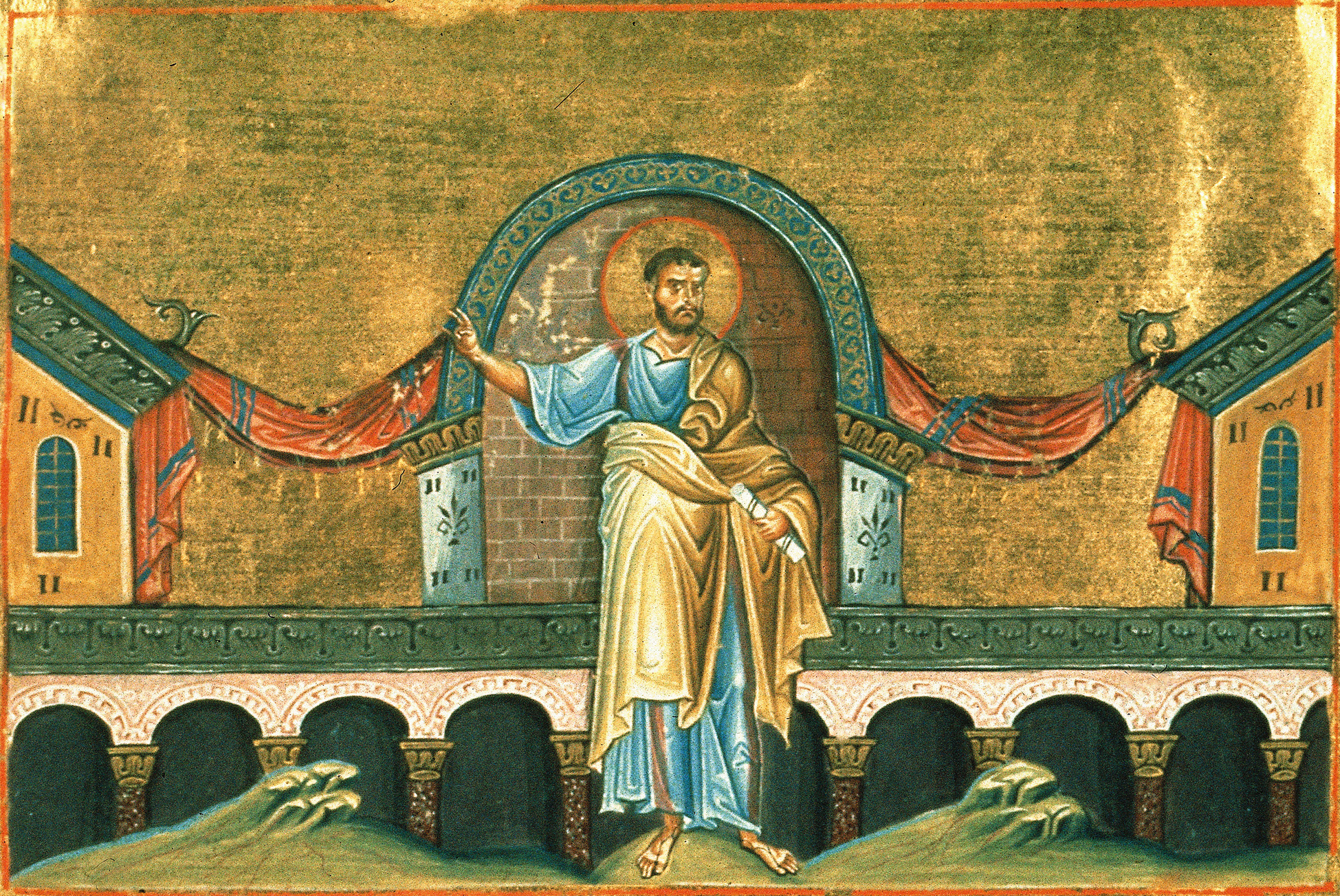
Prophet Ahijah the Shilonite

Ahijah the Shilonite (Hebrew: אֲחִיָּה הַשִּׁילֹנִי, romanized: ʾĂḥiyyā hašŠilōnī; Latin: Achias) is a Levite prophet of Shiloh in the Hebrew Bible's First Books of Kings. Ahijah foretold to Jeroboam that he would become king (1 Kings 11:29).

The Hebrew Bible records two of his prophecies. In 1 Kings 11:31–39, he announced the separation of the Northern ten tribes from Solomon's United Kingdom of Israel, forming the Northern Kingdom. In 1 Kings 14:6–16, Ahijah's prophecy, delivered to the wife of Jeroboam, foretold the death of the king's son, the destruction of the House of Jeroboam, and the fall and captivity of Israel "beyond the River", a stock expression for the land east of the Euphrates.

According to the Second Book of Chronicles, Ahijah also authored a book, described as the "Prophecy of Ahijah the Shilonite," which contained information about Solomon's reign. This text, however, has not survived and is one of the non-canonical books referenced in the Bible. In 1 Kings 11:41 it is referred to as the Acts of Solomon.

Rabbinic tradition credits Ahijah with having lived a very long life, linking his life-span with that of antediluvian patriarchs such as Methuselah and Adam.

== Rabbinic literature ==
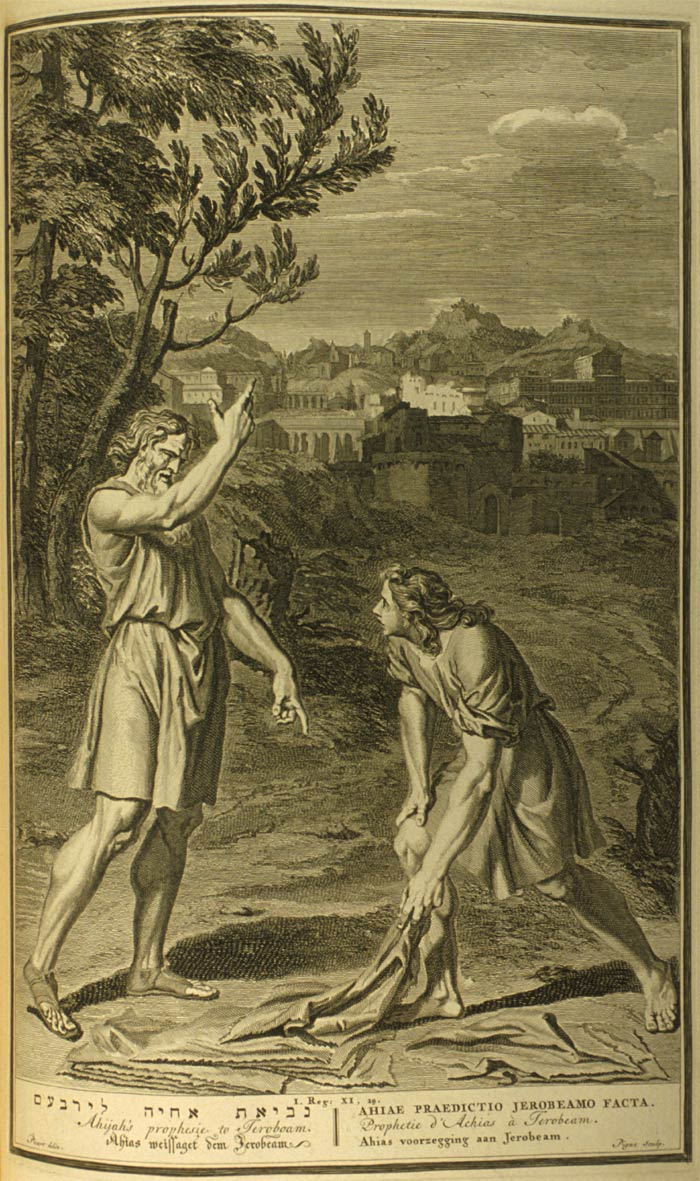
Gerard Hoet, Ahijah's prophecy to Jeroboam, 1728

Ahijah, the prophet of Shiloh, instigated Jeroboam's secession and predicted the downfall of his kingdom. The Midrash, basing itself on the fact that, according to II Chron. ix. 29, Ahijah is described as extremely aged in Jeroboam's time (I Kings, xiv. 4), and with no pedigree, identified him with Ahiah, son of Ahitub, the oracle-giving priest at Shiloh in King Saul's time (I Sam. xiv. 3). He is accordingly singled out by rabbinical tradition as one of the seven long-lived saints whose successive lives extend over the whole history of mankind; each having transmitted the sacred lore from his predecessor to the one succeeding him, while shielding the generations of his time by means of his piety. These saints are: (1) Adam; (2) Methuselah; (3) Shem (Tanna debe Eliyahu R. xxiv.); (4) Jacob (Gen. R. xciv.); (5) Serah, the daughter of Asher, or, as others have it, Amram, the father of Moses; (6) Ahijah of Shiloh; (7) Elijah the prophet, who lives until the coming of the Messiah (Ab. R. N. version B. xxxviii., Seder 'Olam R. i., and B. B. 121b). For the underlying idea, see Ḥag. 12b, and Yoma, 38b, with reference to Prov. x. 25, Heb., "The righteous is the foundation of the world," and Prov. ix. 1, "Wisdom hath hewn seven pillars." According to this tradition Ahijah lived over six hundred years, having received his "wisdom" from either Amram, the father of Moses (see Amram), or from Serah, the daughter of Asher (see Serah).

If from Serah, his age was considerably less, since she was supposed to have lived for more than four hundred years, until the days of David (YalḲ., Sam. § 152). The reason why Ahijah was regarded as having attained so unusual an age seems to be that, according to II Chron. ix. 29, the history of Solomon's reign was written by him; and that he was supposed to be identical with Ahijah the Levite, who was placed by King David in charge of the treasures of the house of God and of the treasures of the dedicated things (I Chron. xxvi. 20; see B. B. 121b, Rashi).

Simon ben Yoḥai is reported to have said: "The world must have thirty righteous men to serve as its pillars. I and my son are counted among these ... and if Abraham would carry the past generations by his merit, I will carry the future generations until the advent of the Messiah. And if Abraham would not, I would count Ahijah of Shiloh with me, and we together would carry the world by our merits" (Gen. R. xxxv.; see Suk. 45b, in which King Jotham is given in place of Abraham and Ahijah).

That Ahijah, though one of the pillars of righteousness, should have been sent to Jeroboam with a divine message inducing him to establish his idolatrous kingdom is explained by the rabbis in the following manner: They say that he was entrapped by a ruse of Jeroboam's idolatrous friends, who circulated a document requesting Jeroboam to become king and stipulating that, if he were elected, he set up a golden calf at Dan and Beth-El. Ahijah signed this document, believing firmly that Jeroboam would not belie his trust. Herein he was mistaken in his pupil. Jeroboam had shown great wisdom and learning, and appeared to Ahijah "as pure as the new garment" he wore when Ahijah saw him coming out of Jerusalem (I Kings, xi. 29). Moreover, as he excelled all the rest of the pupils, he had been initiated by Ahijah into the innermost secrets of the Law (Sanh. 101b et seq.). Just as the words said of Isaac, "his eyes were dim, so that he could not see" (Gen. xxvii. 1), are taken to refer to spiritual blindness, because he favored his wicked son Esau, so the words, "Ahijah could not see, for his eyes were set by reason of his age" (I Kings, xiv. 4), imply spiritual blindness on the part of Ahijah, who favored a wicked pupil and set him up as ruler (Gen. R. lxv.). For this reason Ahijah was stricken with the plague (Gen. R. lxv., Yer. Yeb. xvi. 15c and parallels).

Maimonides, in his introduction to "Yad ha-ḤazaḲah," says:

"Ahijah was a Levite, a disciple of Moses, one of those who went out of Egypt—the tribe of Levi not being included in the divine decree of death in the wilderness [see B. B. 121b], and also a disciple of David [Abraham ben David of Posquières, in his notes, corrects this, and says instead, "a member of David's court of justice"]; and finally he became the teacher of Elijah before his death."
