= Iddo (prophet) =

Minor biblical prophet

Iddo (Hebrew: עִדּוֹ ʿĪddō; also Jedo; Greek: Αδει, Αδδω, Adei, Addō) was a biblical prophet. According to the Books of Chronicles, he lived during the reigns of King Solomon and his heirs, Rehoboam and Abijah, in the Kingdom of Judah.

== Hebrew Bible ==
Although little is known about Iddo, the Books of Chronicles say that the events of Solomon's reign, as well as Iddo's prophecies concerning king Jeroboam I of Israel, were recorded in writing. The alleged records composed by Iddo are no longer extant. He is also credited with a history of King Rehoboam and his son King Abijah.

== Other mentions ==
A tradition of identifying Iddo with the unnamed prophet of 1 Kings 13 can be found in the Talmud, first-century BC Jewish historian Josephus, the fourth- and fifth-century Christian commentator Jerome, and the medieval Jewish commentator Rashi. The protagonist of 1 Kings 13 is identified simply as "a man of God" who prophesies against Jeroboam, as Iddo is said to have done elsewhere. After an unfortunate encounter with an older prophet of Bethel who lies to him, saying that God's angel has instructed him to provide hospitality to him, the "man of God" is killed by a lion as punishment for disobeying a divine command. The older prophet then used his own tomb as a burial place for the "man of God" and ordered his heirs to place his body beside that of the prophet when he died and foretold that the prophesies will come true.

The second Book of Kings records that, 300 years later, during the reign of king Josiah, the king was engaged in the process of burning human bones to ritually defile Jeroboam's altar. During the trip to do so, Josiah noticed the tombstone of the "man of God", and when he asked was told that it was the tomb of the man who had predicted the destruction of Jeroboam's altar. Josiah ordered that the tomb be left unmolested in commemoration of his prophecy.

In addition to claiming that Iddo the prophet is the unnamed man of 1 Kings 13, Jerome also identifies Iddo the prophet with Oded the father of Azariah, who is found in 2 Chronicles 15:8.

== Other individuals with this name ==
Another Iddo is mentioned in Ezra 8:17 as the chief man in a place named Casiphia. Ezra requests assistance from Iddo and his brethren to bring servants for the Temple. It is this Iddo to whom Ezra refers when he calls the prophet Zechariah a "son of Iddo" in Ezra 5:1 and 6:14. Zechariah 1:1 and 1:7 refer to Iddo as the paternal grandfather of Zechariah.

== See also ==
- Acts of Solomon
- Jadon
- Story of the Prophet Iddo
