= Timothy Tow =

Singaporean pastor

Timothy Tow Siang Hui 杜祥辉
- Born: Tow Siang Hui; December 28, 1920; Swatow, Guangdong, China
- Died: April 20, 2009 (aged 88)
- Education: BD, STM, Faith Theological Seminary; DD, Shelton College
- Occupation: Pastor
- Years active: 1950-2009
- Spouse(s): Nancy Loh (1940-1965); Ivy Tan (1938-2024)
- Religion: Christianity - Bible-Presbyterian
- Ordained: August 1950

Timothy Tow Siang Hui (28 December 1920 – 20 April 2009) was a Singaporean pastor who founded the Bible-Presbyterian Church. He was also founding principal of the Far Eastern Bible College.

== Personal life ==
Tow was educated at the Anglo-Chinese School. He was influenced first by John Sung, and later by Carl McIntire. He studied at Faith Theological Seminary and was ordained in Geneva in 1950 at a special meeting of the Philadelphia Presbytery of the Bible Presbyterian Church. Tow returned to Singapore and became pastor of the Life Church English Service at "Say Mia Tng Teck Khah" or Life Church Teck Khah (located at 144 Prinsep Street) which was later renamed Singapore Life Church. In 1955, he led a group out of the Chinese Presbyterian Synod to form the Bible-Presbyterian Church. Tow's congregation became known as Life Bible-Presbyterian Church (Life BPC). He later returned to Faith Theological Seminary and completed a Master of Sacred Theology degree.

In 2003, Tow resigned from Life BPC and founded True Life Bible-Presbyterian Church. He had been criticized for holding to the doctrine of Verbal Plenary Preservation (VPP) and, together with the other directors of the Far Eastern Bible College (FEBC), was sued in 2008 by Life BPC for teaching this doctrine in the Church's attempt to evict the College from the Gilstead Road premises which had been shared by the two institutions from the outset. However the Church failed as the Court of Appeal of Singapore, the apex court in the Singapore legal system, ruled on 26 April 2011 that (i)“the VPP doctrine is actually closely related to the VPI doctrine which both parties [i.e., FEBC and Life BPC] adhere to,” (rejecting Life BPC’s contention in [59] of the Court of Appeal Judgement that it is “an entirely different creature from the VPI doctrine");” (ii) “the College, in adopting the VPP doctrine, has not deviated from the fundamental principles which guide and inform the work of the College right from its inception, and as expressed in the Westminster Confession;” (iii) “[i]t is not inconsistent for a Christian who believes fully in the principles contained within the Westminster Confession (and the VPI [Verbal Plenary Inspiration] doctrine) to also subscribe to the VPP doctrine;” and (iv) “[i]n the absence of anything in the Westminster Confession that deals with the status of the apographs, we [the Court] hesitate to find that the verbal plenary preservation doctrine is a deviation from the principles contained within the Westminster Confession."

== Publications ==
- John Sung My Teacher (1985) ISBN 9971-991-13-6
- The Law of Moses and of Jesus (1986) ISBN 9971-991-15-2
- Asian Awakening (1988) ISBN 981-05-3257-1
- A Glimpse of the Life and Works of John Calvin (1993) ISBN 9971-991-29-2
- William C. Burns: Grandfather of Bible-Presbyterians (1994) ISBN 9971-991-34-9
- Pattern for Church Growth and Missions (1996) ISBN 981-00-7539-1
- An Abridgement of Calvin's Institutes of the Christian Religion Book I-IV (1997) ISBN 981-00-9335-7
- A Theology for Every Christian Book I: Knowing God and His Word (1998) co-authored with Jeffrey Khoo ISBN 981-04-0076-4
- Theology for Every Christian: A Systematic Theology in the Reformed and Premillennial Tradition of J Oliver Buswell (2007) co-authored with Jeffrey Khoo ISBN 978-981-05-9034-5

Academic offices
Preceded by New Office	Principal of the Far Eastern Bible College; 1962-2009	Succeeded by Jeffrey Khoo
