= Acts of Solomon =

Lost biblical text

The similarly named Biblical book is located at Song of Solomon.

The [Book of the] Acts of Solomon (Hebrew: ספר דברי שלמה, romanized: sêp̄er diḇrê Šəlōmōh), also referred to as the Book of the Annals of Solomon, is a lost text referred to in 1 Kings 11:41, which reads:

And the rest of the acts of Solomon, and all that he did, and his wisdom, are they not written in the book of the acts of Solomon?

In 2 Chronicles 9:29–31 the names of the writers of the royal household record are given:

the history of Nathan the prophet, the prophecy of Ahijah the Shilonite, and the visions of Iddo the seer concerning Jeroboam the son of Nebat

The prophet Ahijah, who played the role of secretary in the administrative office of King Solomon, has authored this book. This book is referenced as "...the Prophecy of Ahijah the Shilonite".

The biblical prophet Iddo was the author of other lost texts.

The Geneva Bible editors suggested that it was lost during the exile in Babylon.

== See also ==
- Table of books of Judeo-Christian Scripture
- Lost books of the New Testament
- Lost literary work
