= Anthos (play) =

- Original language: Ancient Greek
- Written by: Agathon
- Genre: Athenian tragedy

Premiere
- Date: 5^{th} century BCE
- Place: Athens

Anthos or Antheus (Ancient Greek: Ἄνθος, lit. 'The Flower') is a play by the 5th-century BCE Athenian dramatist Agathon. The play has been lost in its entirety. The play is mentioned by Aristotle in his Poetics (1451b) as an example of a tragedy with a plot which gives pleasure despite the incidents and characters being entirely made up. Anthos is thus the only known Greek tragedy play whose plot was entirely invented by the poet. Other 5th-century BCE tragedies were based on myths, or less frequently on actual history.

== Possible contents ==
The play's plot is not clear due to no fragment from it surviving; H. J. Rose claimed that Parthenius of Nicaea sourced the story of Antheus and Cleoboea from this Anthos (or rather Antheus if this was the case), a typical Potiphar's wife tale where Antheus rejects the married Cleoboea's amorous advances, and she in revenge kills him by throwing a boulder on him after convincing him to go down into a well. Other scholars suggested that the stage play was the origin of the tale of Anthus, the unfortunate youth who was devoured by the family mares and was transformed into some kind of bird by the gods.

== See also ==
- Hippolytus
- Philonome
- Yusuf and Zulaikha
- Phaedra
- Stheneboea

== Bibliography ==
- Aristotle (2000). "Poetics". Classical Literary Criticism. Translated by Dorsch, T.S. Penguin Classics. ISBN 9780140446517.
- Austin, N. (2011). Sophocles' Philoctetes and the Great Soul Robbery. University of Wisconsin Press. ISBN 9780299282745.
- Celoria, Francis (1992). The Metamorphoses of Antoninus Liberalis: A Translation with a Commentary. Routledge. ISBN 0-415-06896-7.
- Forbes Irving, Paul M. C. (1990). Metamorphosis in Greek Myths. Clarendon Press. ISBN 0-19-814730-9.
- Pitcher, Seymour M. (1939). "The Anthus of Agathon". The American Journal of Philology. 60 (2). doi:10.2307/291196. JSTOR 291196.
- Rose, Herbert J. (2004). A Handbook of Greek Mythology (6th ed.). London, New York: Routledge. ISBN 0-415-04601-7.
- Wright, W.C.F. (1907). A short history of Greek literature from Homer to Julian. University of California.
