= Cretans (play) =

Lost tragedy by Euripides

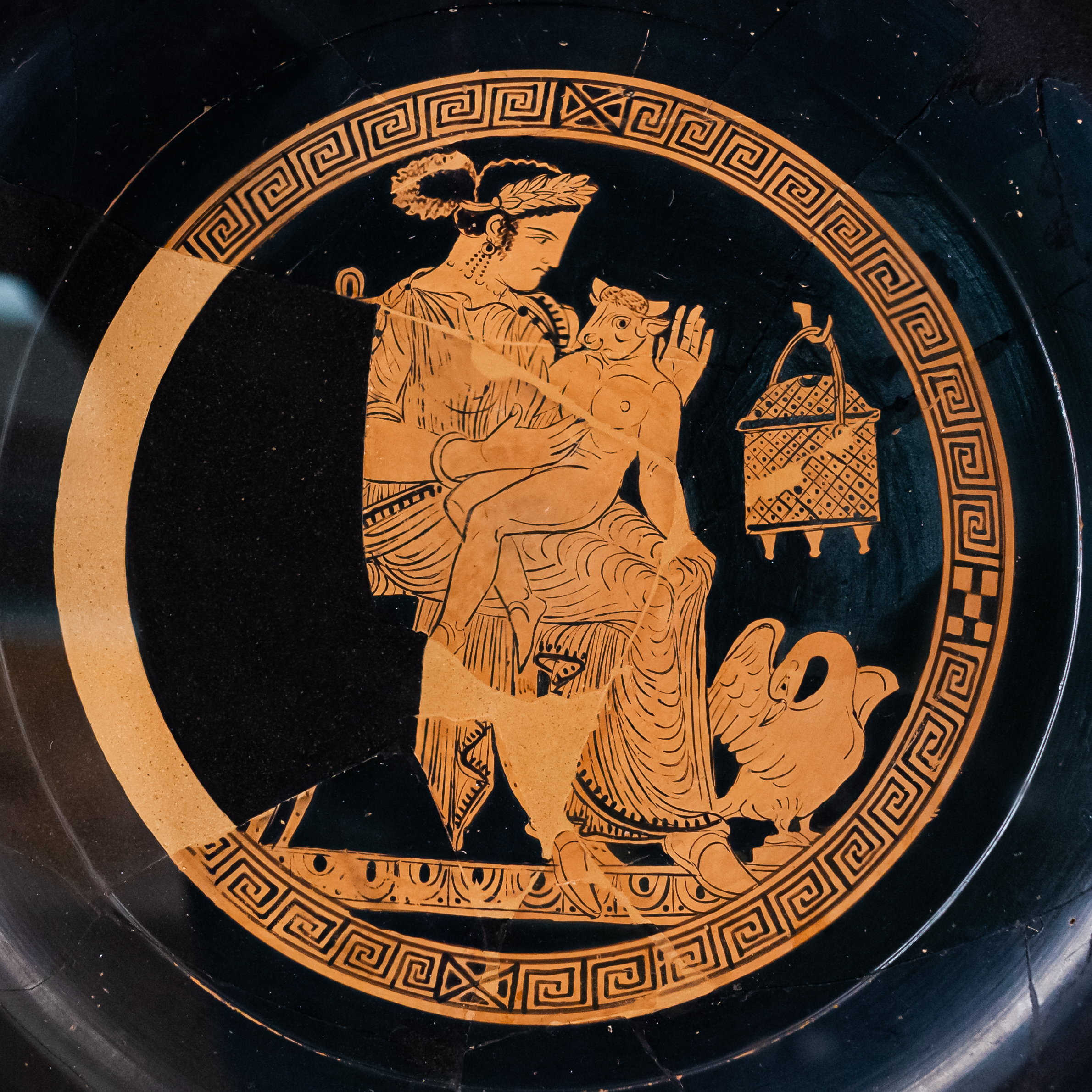
- Pasiphaë and the infant Minotaur, Etruscan red-figure cylix from the first half of the 4th century BC, housed in the BnF Museum
- Written by: Euripides
- Chorus: Cretan men
- Characters: Pasiphaë; Minos; Icarus; Daedalus ? Nurse ? Messenger ?
- Original language: Ancient Greek
- Subject: Birth of the Minotaur
- Genre: Greek tragedy
- Setting: Minos' palace in Crete

Premiere
- Date premiered: c. 438 BC ?

The Cretans or Cretes (Ancient Greek: Κρῆτες) is a lost ancient Greek tragedy by playwright Euripides, written some time during the later half of the fifth century BC, with few fragments surviving. It retold the story of the birth of the Minotaur, the half-bull half-man monster that King Minos kept in the labyrinth before it was killed by the Athenian hero Theseus.

It was probably produced around the 430s BC, but its accompanying plays are unknown, as is the reception and place at the competition it got. Its plot cannot be reconstructed easily due to the small amount of testimonies about the play.

== Background ==
Pasiphaë appears in fifth-century BC Greek literature, where she is presented as the wife of Minos and mother of the Minotaur. Minos was supposed to sacrifice to Poseidon a splendid bull he was gifted from the god in order to secure the throne of Crete. Poseidon in anger made Pasiphaë fall in love with the bull, and she asked help from the inventor Daedalus. Daedalus built a hollow cow suit for her, and in time she gave birth to the Minotaur. Minos locked up the man-eating monster inside the labyrinth, another invention of Daedalus'.

Since the most extensive surviving accounts of Pasiphaë's myth date to the Hellenistic and Roman periods it is hard to know what the myth that Euripides knew was like. The only archaic source to mention the tale is the Catalogue of Women where Minos' wife lies with a bull and bears a monster; later, during the classical era, Bacchylides writes that Pasiphaë had Daedalus help her out with her passion which is described as a 'disease', potentially a node to the curse's godsent status. Euripides is the earliest author who includes Poseidon's role in the story.

Until 1907, nothing but the title and a reference to Icarus was known about this play, until a damaged papyrus surfaced with Pasiphaë's speech, followed by more papyrus fragments in 1962. Its setting is Minos' palace in Crete, with a chorus made up of the titular Cretan men. The metrical features of the play, only comparable to Euripides' early play Alcestis, suggest an early date for the Cretans, and Pohlenz dated it to around 438 BC. The obscurity surrounding this title is notable. It has no surviving summary, ancient scholars seem to have ignored its existence entirely, and no later authors ever quoted lines from it.

== Fragments ==
The tragedy likely began with someone, perhaps Poseidon or Aphrodite (if she was the agent of Pasiphaë's infatuation), narrating the play's backstory to the audience followed by Minos' discovery of the unusual birth. A chorus of Cretan priests of Zeus make their appearance then, addressing Minos directly and describing their rites. Next Minos is interrogating someone, perhaps a nurse, about the newborn infant and its nature; it has a bull's head, a tail but is bipedal, and the nurse also informs him that Pasiphaë breastfeeds the creature. The chorus appeals to Apollo for help.

If later accounts from pseudo-Apollodorus and Hyginus can be used safely to reconstruct the plot of the Cretans, then Minos subsequently orders Daedalus to build a prison for the Minotaur. The central episode seems to have been Minos and Pasiphaë's argument, perhaps an agon or a debate common in Euripidean drama, partially preserved in a long fragment where the two royals have a heated row about Pasiphaë's actions. Minos' accusations are largely not preserved, but Pasiphaë delivers a masterful speech defending herself using advanced rhetorical techniques, such as the argument of probability and her character, rhetorical question and counter-accusation in which she puts the blame on Minos for her woes, arguing that it was his transgression that caused their grief. The speech bespeaks of Euripides' mastery of lawcourt rhetoric. Minos, not convinced, sentences her to death as the chorus in vain tries to change his mind.

Now, if I had thrown myself at a man and tried to sell my body for sex in secret, I would already and rightly be revealed as libidinous. As it is, because a god's onslaught made me mad, I suffer; but my sin is not voluntary. Why, it has no likelihood! What was there I saw in a bull to eat at my heart, in such shameful affliction?

— Pasiphaë in Euripides frag. 472e, lines 5–12 (trans. Collard 1995).

From ancient scholia we know that Icarus, Daedalus' son, had a monody in the play with a bold character. This would have been before his fatal flight, possibly a lamentation of his and Daedalus' imprisonment; the beginning of their flight was probably accomplished through the use of the flying-machine, while its disastrous (for Icarus) ending would have been related through a messenger. Pasiphaë's fate is also a puzzle, but probably a deus-ex-machina (possible candidates include Poseidon and Athena) freed her, and she might have even assisted in the escape of Daedalus and Icarus; perhaps a messenger announced all these people's escapes.

== Analysis and parallels ==
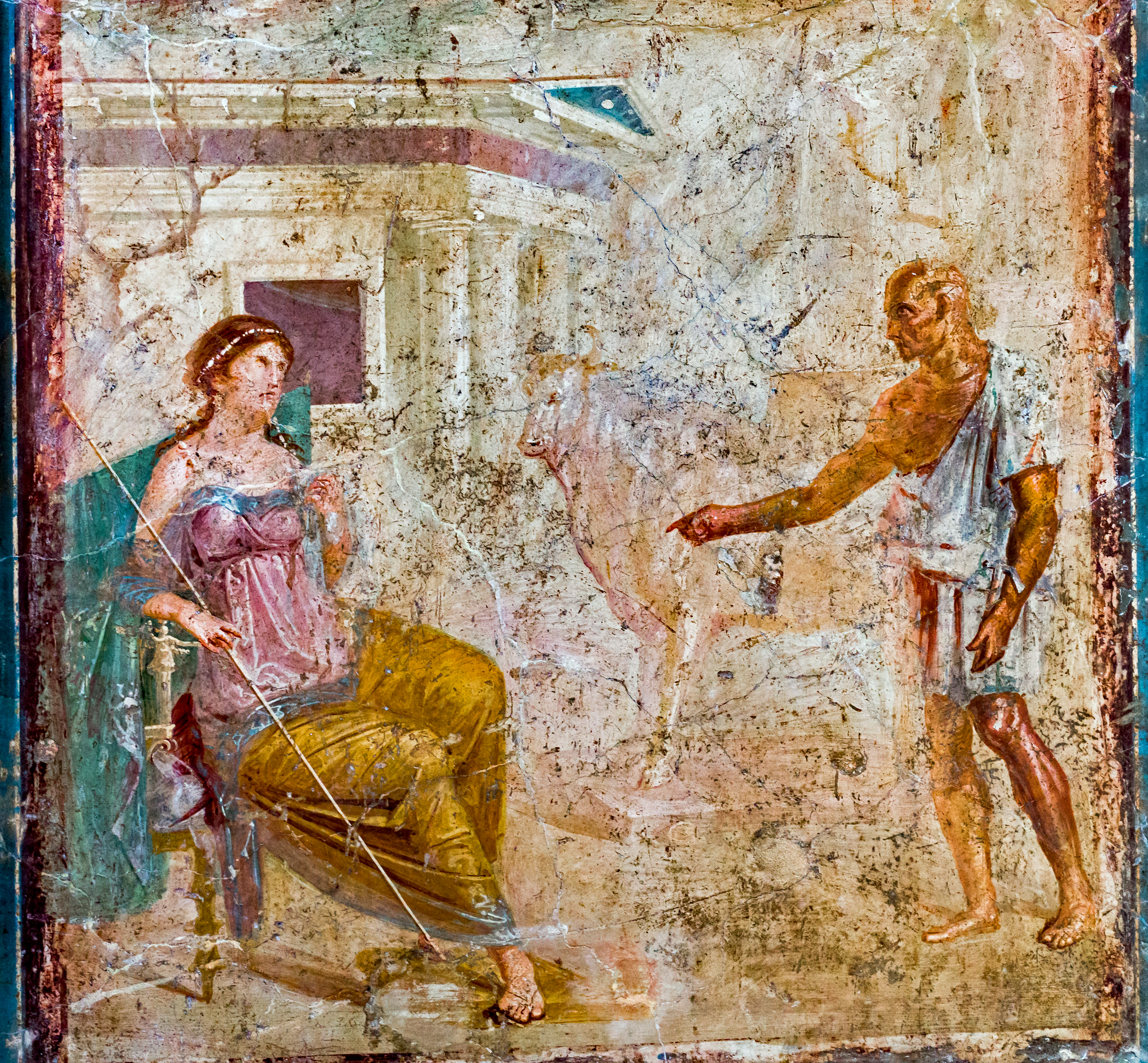
Daedalus and Pasiphaë, Roman wall-painting from Pompeii.

Pasiphaë and Minos' argument has been compared to that of Hippolytus and his father Theseus (from the extant Hippolytus tragedy); Minos, like Theseus, is harsh and abruptly condemns the accused, whom he also sentences to death. Pasiphaë's portrayal in the tragedy is an example of Euripides' exploration of 'wicked women' who were promiscuous and often unfaithful to their husbands such as Phaedra (Pasiphaë's own daughter), Stheneboea and Aerope. Euripides' plays on bad women feature improper sexual misconducts by said women, be it infidelity, incest or bestiality. Pasiphaë's speech, which gives us access to her own thoughts and feelings about the situation, might indicate a sympathetic presentation in the play. Like Phaedra in Euripides' second attempt at adapting the myth, Pasiphaë is cursed with uncontrollable lust by a god and might have been characterised as a victim rather than a perpetrator.

That being said, Pasiphaë's bestiality sets her apart from the other women, and it may well be that her attempt at self-defence was portrayed as inefficient and weak. The problem in our efforts to decipher her portrayal is the lack of information, as Euripides could have either used the myth literally to show an innocent person suffering from greater causes, or exposed the traditional myth to criticism with an examination of the queen's autonomy and irrationality. The involuntariness of the accused was a common defence in fifth-century BC Athenian lawcourts.

The argument between the king and queen has been proposed to be an agon, a debate between two characters, common in Euripides' plays. However her speech is followed by a short and brutal reply by Minos, instead of the counter-argument typical in agones where he would reject Pasiphaë's narrative. It is unlikely that a full speech by Minos followed in the missing section. Moreover, Pasiphaë does not reference her opponent's claims, and the chorus' leading comment is lyrical rather than in trimeter.

== See also ==
Similar motifs:

- Stheneboea
- Phaedra
- Leda

== Bibliography ==
- Battezzato, Luigi (2020). "Fragmented Self and Fragmented Responsibility: Pasiphae in Euripides' Cretans". In Finglass, Patrick J.; Coo, Lyndsay (eds.). Female Characters in Fragmentary Greek Tragedy. Cambridge University Press. doi:10.1017/9781108861199. ISBN 9781108861199.
- Collard, Christopher; Cropp, Martin; Lee, K.H., eds. (1995). Euripides: Selected Fragmentary Plays. Vol. I. UK, USA: Oxbow Books. ISBN 978-0-85668-619-1.
- Collard, Christopher; Cropp, Martin, eds. (2008). Euripides Fragments: Aegeus-Meleager. Loeb Classical Library 504. Cambridge, MA: Harvard University Press.
- Cropp, Martin; Fick, G. (1985). Resolutions and Chronology in Euripides: The Fragmentary Tragedies. Institute of Classical Studies. ISBN 0-900587-46-6.
- Gantz, Timothy (1993). Early Greek Myth: A Guide to Literary and Artistic Sources. Vol. I. Johns Hopkins University Press. ISBN 978-0-8018-5360-9.
- Hard, Robin (2004). The Routledge Handbook of Greek Mythology: Based on H. J. Rose's "Handbook of Greek Mythology". Routledge. ISBN 9780415186360.
- Hathorn, Richmond Y. (1967). Crowell's Handbook to Classical Drama. NYC, United States: Thomas Y. Crowell Company. ISBN 0-690-22501-6.
- Lexicon Iconographicum Mythologiae Classicae (LIMC). VII.1: Oidipous – Theseus, Zurich and Munich, Artemis Verlag, 1994. ISBN 3760887511. Internet Archive.
- Sampatakakis, Georgios (2007). Ευριπίδης: Κρήτες [Euripides: Cretans] (in Greek). Athens, Greece: Smilis. ISBN 978-960-7793-75-1.
- Schmitz, Leonhard (1867). Smith, William (ed.). A Dictionary of Greek and Roman Biography and Mythology. London, UK: John Murray, printed by Spottiswoode and Co. Online version at the Perseus Digital Library.
- Wright, Matthew (2019). The Lost Plays of Greek Tragedy. Vol. 2: Aeschylus, Sophocles and Euripides. London, UK: Bloomsbury Academic. ISBN 978-1-4742-7646-7.
