= Eunostus (hero) =

Hero of Tanagra in Greek mythology

In Greek mythology, Eunostus (Ancient Greek: Εὔνοστος, romanized: Eúnostos, "good yield" or "happy return") was a hero of Tanagra, Boeotia. His parents were Elieus, son of Cephissus, and Scias. He was said to have received his name from the nymph Eunosta who reared him.

== Mythology ==
The story of Eunostus' death, related by Plutarch with a reference to the poet Myrtis of Anthedon, is as follows: Ochne, a daughter of Colonus and cousin of Eunostus, fell in love with him, but he rejected her advances and was going to report the matter to her brothers, Echemus, Leon and Bucolus. She forestalled him by telling her brothers that Eunostus had taken her by force; they laid an ambush against Eunostus and killed him. Elieus seized the murderers of his son and put them in bonds. Then Ochne, overcome with remorse, confessed to Elieus that her accusations were false. Colonus, who judged the matter, sent his sons into exile, and Ochne committed suicide by throwing herself off a height.

Plutarch further relates that there was a sanctuary of Eunostus in Tanagra, and that women were not allowed to enter the precinct, not even in emergency cases like earthquakes.

== See also ==
- Phaedra and Hippolytus
- Cleoboea and Antheus
- Stheneboea and Bellerophon
- Tenes and Philonome
