= Phaedra (Sophocles play) =

Lost tragedy by Sophocles

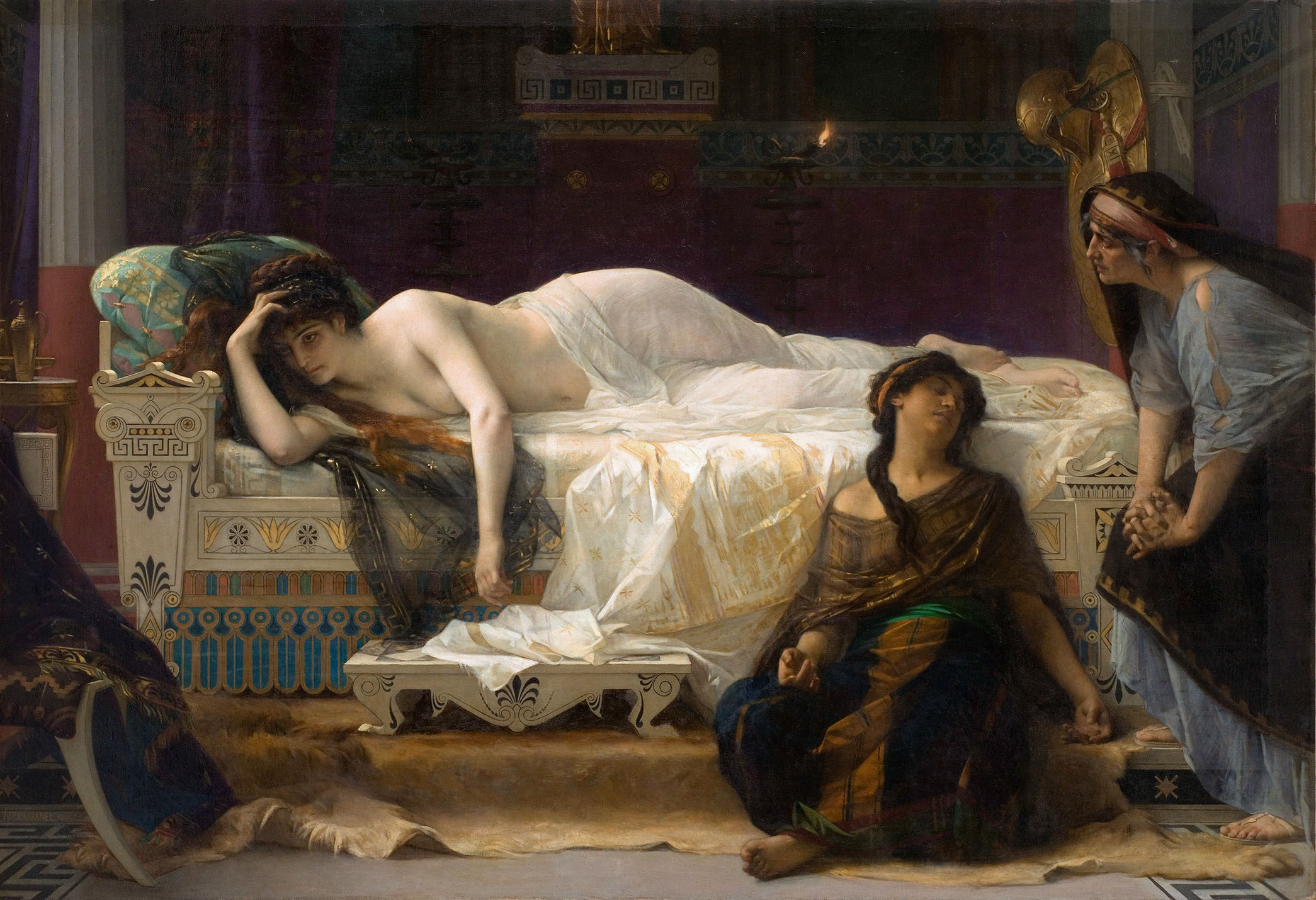
- Phaedra, 1880 painting by Alexandre Cabanel
- Original language: Ancient Greek
- Written by: Sophocles
- Chorus: Athenian women
- Characters: Phaedra; Hippolytus; Theseus; Nurse ?
- Subject: Phaedra's love for Hippolytus
- Genre: Greek tragedy
- Setting: Athens

Premiere
- Date: c. 435–429 BC
- Place: Athens

Phaedra (Ancient Greek: Φαίδρα) is a lost ancient Greek tragedy by fifth-century BC Athenian playwright Sophocles, which dramatised the myth of Phaedra, the queen of Athens and wife of Theseus who fell in love with her stepson Hippolytus. The brief and few fragments remaining of the play make it hard to reconstruct it faithfully, though its influence on contemporary and later treatments of the myth, including the tragedies of Euripides on the same subject, is evident. Likewise it is not known what year and festival it premiered, which other tragedies it was produced with, or what place it got in the competition. While Euripides faced severe criticism for his portrayal of Phaedra in his first attempt, there is no confirmation the same happened to Sophocles.

== Background ==
In the traditional myth, Phaedra is the wife of the Athenian hero and king Theseus and stepmother to Hippolytus, his son by an Amazon. Phaedra fell ardently in love with Hippolytus, but he rejected her so she accused him of raping her. Theseus believed her, and asked his father Poseidon to kill Hippolytus before he figured out (or was told) the truth. Phaedra took her own life as well. Both Sophocles and Euripides produced plays based on Phaedra's myth, followed by Seneca the Younger during the Roman era. Since Seneca did not take the title of his play or his focus on the queen from Euripides, he might have taken these elements from Sophocles.

It is important however to note that other than Phaedra's small appearance in the Odyssey, Sophocles and Euripides themselves are the oldest known treatments of her and Hippolytus' myth. Euripides produced two Hippolytus plays, the second of which is the extant one. It is not known when Sophocles' Phaedra premiered in relation to the Hippolytus plays, nor how much it influenced and was influenced by them, though their relation has been studied meticulously by scholars. At least one, or even both, of Euripides' tragedies was likely written in response to Phaedra, though some researchers theorise that the order of production of those plays was Hippolytus I – Phaedra – Hippolytus II, meaning that each playwright gradually offered a different characterisation of the two leads (and presented Phaedra more sympathetically) in each new version that came out. Barrett describes Sophocles' Phaedra as neither as shameless as the first Euripidean Phaedra nor as virtuous as the second one.

== Condition and fragments ==
The plot of the lost Phaedra is very hard to reconstruct. It is even more obscure than the lost Hippolytus, and few things can be stated about it with certainty. Attempts for reconstruction based on later accounts, such as Seneca's Phaedra, are 'unconvincing' according to Lloyd-Jones. Twenty fragments remain, most of which are gnomic or lexicographic, mostly quotations of erotic nature. They mostly deal with pleasure and shame, or bad versus good wives, which seems to tie to Phaedra's moral dilemma. It remains unclear, but plausible, whether in Sophocles' version Phaedra actively tried to seduce her stepson herself or used a middleman, such as a nurse.

Although similar to Euripides' surviving play, notable differences can be detected as well. Fragment 680 implies that Zeus had something to do with Phaedra's uncontrollable lust for Hippolytus, and not Aphrodite like in Euripides' drama(s), although Sommertein claims that Zeus in this context only refers to divine power. But most notably, Theseus was not only absent but considered dead due to being trapped in the Underworld after he ventured there along with his friend Pirithous to kidnap Persephone. This has been described as very significant, because it seems to extenuate Phaedra's behaviour; if she thought her husband was dead, her proposition to Hippolytus would not be stained by infidelity, though it would still be seen as improper. As a widow, Phaedra's loyalty should lie to her children, to whom Hippolytus could be a potential rival. Thus Sophocles' heroine is one who is driven the most by ignorance, tragedy arising from events she could not have foreseen.

== Possible reconstruction ==
A 2nd-century AD Roman sarcophagus with Phaedra and Hippolytus from Tripoli, now kept in the Istanbul Archaeology Museums, Turkey.

The tragedy was very possibly set in Athens, in a departure from the traditional story, with a chorus consisting of women. Phaedra appears to be ashamed of her passion for the younger man, but has no restrain against loving him. Fragment 693a has been doubtfully attributed to this tragedy, but if genuine it means Phaedra had a female advisor or counsellor who offered advice to her, of which she strongly disapproved. This might have been a nurse like in the preserved Hippolytus, who might even have been the one to make the proposition to Hippolytus. It seems that the nurse disagreed at first, but perhaps Phaedra convinced her to help her out eventually. Phaedra probably made her move then (through the nurse or not), but was rebuffed; fragment 678 states that 'he spat out the proposal', which no doubt is Hippolytus' reaction to (and rejection of) his stepmother's love. The rejection scene likely happened off-stage and was reported to the audience. Hippolytus departed on his chariot after rejecting Phaedra but before the arrival of Theseus, and was never seen alive again, which also means that father and son did not interract on stage.

Fragments 686 and 687 show someone express surprise that some other character is alive, and someone talking about a dog; this has to be Theseus, who informs someone—possibly the chorus leader—of his escape from the Underworld. Phaedra afterwards made her rape charge, but what exactly was her motivation remains unknown. A fragment shows a speaker talk about women and children, so Phaedra must have been motivated by the need to remain the mother her children need, and despair due to Theseus' unexpected return and the likelihood of Hippolytus reporting her to him. The details of Phaedra's suicide are also obscure; she must have been alive for the accusation, as Theseus made a long description of his Underworld adventures, an odd decision if he returned to find the household in chaos due to Phaedra's suicide. Theseus then likely cursed Hippolytus like he does in the extant play. Kiso on the other hand suggested that Theseus' arrival did lead to Phaedra's suicide, and the play featured a scene between Theseus and Hippolytus where the young man failed to clear himself of all suspicions and convince his father of his innocence.

However, if we accept that Hippolytus predeceased Phaedra (as is more common) and that Seneca's version was based on Sophocles', then Hippolytus' dead and mangled body was brought on stage following his gruesome death, Theseus expressed both satisfaction and grief at his child's demise, while Phaedra in remorse confessed the truth and took her life off-stage as the chorus and Theseus continued to mourn. Seneca's Phaedra cutting a lock from her hair was likely taken from Sophocles too.

== Dating ==
There is no reliable surviving information about what year Phaedra premiered in, or the tetralogy it was part of, and its date can only be determined when compared to the two tragedies of Euripides. If the hypothesis that Phaedra was later than the first Hippolytus but earlier than the second one is accepted, then it was written some time between 435 and 429 BC (428 BC being the date the second Hippolytus was made), and surely no later than 421 BC.

== See also ==
- Potiphar's wife, the mythological motif regarding Phaedra
- Ochne
- Cleoboea
- Stheneboea, similar play

== Bibliography ==
- Barrett, William Spencer, ed. (1964). Euripides: Hippolytos, edited with Introduction and Commentary. Oxford, Toronto: Oxford University Press, Clarendon Press.
- Grimal, Pierre (1987). The Dictionary of Classical Mythology. Wiley-Blackwell. ISBN 0-631-13209-0.
- Hard, Robin (2004). The Routledge Handbook of Greek Mythology: Based on H. J. Rose's "Handbook of Greek Mythology". Routledge. ISBN 9780415186360.
- Hathorn, Richmond Y. (1967). Crowell's Handbook to Classical Drama. NYC, United States: Thomas Y. Crowell Company. ISBN 0-690-22501-6.
- Kiso, Akiko (1973). "Sophocles' Phaedra and the Phaedra of the First Hippolytus". Bulletin of the Institute of Classical Studies (20).
- Lloyd-Jones, Hugh (1996). Sophocles: Fragments. Loeb Classical Library 483. Cambridge, MA: Harvard University Press. ISBN 978-0-674-99532-1.
- Schmitz, Leonhard (1867). Smith, William (ed.). A Dictionary of Greek and Roman Biography and Mythology. London, UK: John Murray, printed by Spottiswoode and Co. Online version at the Perseus.tufts library.
- Sommerstein, Alan H. (2020). "Women in Love in the Fragmentary Plays of Sophocles". In Finglass, Patrick J.; Coo, Lyndsay (eds.). Female Characters in Fragmentary Greek Tragedy. Cambridge University Press. doi:10.1017/9781108861199. ISBN 9781108861199.
- Sommerstein, Alan H.; Fitzpatrick, David; Talboy, Thomas, eds. (2006). Sophocles: Selected Fragmentary Plays with Introductions, Translations and Commentaries. Vol. I. Oxbow Books. ISBN 978-0-85668-765-5.
- Sutton, Dana F. (1984). The Lost Sophocles. University Press of America. ISBN 0-8191-4030-9.
- Waldner, Katharina (October 1, 2006). "Phaedra". In Cancik, Hubert; Schneider, Helmuth (eds.). Brill's New Pauly. Translated by Christine F. Salazar. Berlin: Brill Reference Online. ISSN 1574-9347.
- Wright, Matthew (2019). The Lost Plays of Greek Tragedy. Vol. 2: Aeschylus, Sophocles and Euripides. London, UK: Bloomsbury Academic. ISBN 978-1-4742-7646-7.
- Zwierlein, Otto (2004). "Senecas 'Phaedra' und ihre Vorbilder nach dem Fund der neuen 'Hippolytos'-Papyri". In Junge, Rebekka; Schmitz, Christine (eds.). Band 1 Seneca (in German). Berlin, Boston: De Gruyter.
