= Epigoni (disambiguation) =

In Greek mythology, the Epigoni are the progeny of the heroes who fought in the First Theban War.

Epigoni can also refer to:

- Epigoni (play), a lost play by Sophocles
- Epigoni (epic), a lost early Greek epic poem, sequel to the Thebaid
- Epigoni (phalangites), Alexander the Great’s Asiatic phalanx
- Epigoni, the progeny of the Diadochi of Alexander the Great
