= Antenorides =

Antenorides (Ancient Greek: Ἀντηνορίδης) was a patronymic of ancient Greece, used in Greek mythology, from the mythological Antenor, and applied to his sons and descendants, the Antenoridae. Pindar and the scholiast on Pindar suggest that the Antenoridae were worshipped in ancient Cyrene because of the legend of their migration to Cyrene from Troy.

The historian Strabo makes reference to a lost play of Sophocles called the Antenoridae (Ἀντηνορίδαι), which may have dealt with the history of the family following the Trojan War.

According to the medieval writer and printer William Caxton in his translation of Raoul Lefèvre, Recuyell of the Historyes of Troye, "Antenorides" was also the name of one of the six gates of Troy, named after Antenor, though this is not recorded in any known ancient source. This gate is also later mentioned in William Shakespeare's play Troilus and Cressida.
