= Cleoboea (queen of Miletus) =

Queen in Greek mythology

In Greek mythology, Cleoboea (/ˌkliːəˈbiːə/; Ancient Greek: Κλεόβοια, romanized: Kleóboia, lit. 'renowned cattle'), also called Philaechme (Ancient Greek: Φιλαίχμη, romanized: Philaíkhmē), is the wife of Phobius and queen consort of Miletus who falls desperately in love with Antheus, a royal hostage of their court, an infatuation that leads them both to their doom. Cleoboea's myth is known thanks to the works of Hellenistic and Roman-era Greek grammarian Parthenius of Nicaea, who attributes the story to Aristotle and authors of the Milesian tales.

== Mythology ==
Queen Cleoboea and King Phobius ruled over Miletus, an ancient Greek city-state on the western coast of Asia Minor. One day they received in their court a royal hostage from nearby Halicarnassus, a young and handsome man named Antheus. Cleoboea fell in love with the youth, and employed all means possible to make him return her affections. However Antheus kept rejecting her, appealing to the danger of them being discovered, and the fact that an affair between them would be unholy to Zeus, the god of hospitality, who would not look favourly upon a man who slept with his host's wife in his own house. She accused him of arrogance and mercilessness, and seeing how her words fell on deaf ears, Cleoboea's passion grew for the worse, and she swore vengeance against him.

For a time, she pretended to have fallen out of love with him and was very civil around Antheus, until one day she chased a particularly tame partridge down a deep well, or alternatively threw her golden cup down the well. She then asked Antheus to go down the well and fetch it out for her. Antheus, being none the wiser, agreed, not suspecting her ill intentions. When he was deep down the well looking for it, Cleoboea pushed down a large boulder on him, which crushed and killed the unfortunate Antheus instantly. She was immediately overcome with regret and remorse over her crime, and still deeply enamored with Antheus, took her own life by hanging. Witnessing the great tragedy that struck his palace and interpreting it as a bad omen, Phobius considered himself damned, and gave the Milesian throne over to another man named Phrygius.

== Culture ==
This story is one of the several variants of the common motif of Potiphar's wife found in Greek mythology, a very popular theme in which a married woman fails to seduce a man and then tries to destroy him; other examples include Hippolytus and Phaedra, Bellerophon and Stheneboea, Tenes and Philonome. Usually those false accusations are due to the spurned woman's hurt pride, though also fear of being reported to their husbands. Unlike the other women, Cleoboea does not falsely accuse Antheus of sexually assaulting her, but rather kills him in cold blood, and her motivation is revenge.

Several versions of the Antheus and Cleoboea myth seem to have existed in antiquity, and H. J. Rose claimed that the earliest of these was invented by Agathon, an Athenian tragic poet of the fifth century BC, in his lost work Anthos or Antheus ("the flower"), the only known Greek tragedy whose plot was entirely original instead of being based on pre-existing mythology or history. But the story could had also been a local legend traditional to Miletus.

== See also ==
- Rhodopis and Euthynicus
- Yusuf and Zulaikha
- Ochne

== Bibliography ==
- Austin, N. (2011). Sophocles' Philoctetes and the Great Soul Robbery. University of Wisconsin Press. ISBN 9780299282745.
- Bell, Robert E. (1991). Women of Classical Mythology: A Biographical Dictionary. ABC-Clio. ISBN 9780874365818.
- Grimal, Pierre (1987). The Dictionary of Classical Mythology. Wiley-Blackwell. ISBN 0-631-13209-0.
- March, Jennifer R. (May 31, 2014). Dictionary of Classical Mythology. Oxbow Books. ISBN 978-1-78297-635-6.
- Michel, Raphael (October 1, 2006). "Cleoboea". In Cancik, Hubert; Schneider, Helmuth (eds.). Brill's New Pauly. Basel: Brill Reference Online. doi:10.1163/1574-9347_bnp_e616010. ISSN 1574-9347.
- Parthenius, Love Romances translated by Sir Stephen Gaselee (1882–1943), S. Loeb Classical Library Volume 69. Cambridge, MA. Harvard University Press. 1916. Online version at the Topos Text Project.
- Pitcher, Seymour M. (1939). "The Anthus of Agathon". The American Journal of Philology. 60 (2): 145–169. doi:10.2307/291196. JSTOR 291196.
- Rose, Herbert J. (2004). A Handbook of Greek Mythology (6th ed.). London, New York: Routledge. ISBN 0-415-04601-7.
- Sergent, Bernard (1986). Homosexuality in Greek Myth. Beacon press.
- Trenkner, Sophie (1958). The Greek Novella in the Classical Period. Cambridge, UK: Cambridge University Press. ISBN 978-1-107-43825-5.
- Wissmann, Jessica (October 21, 2019). "Does Mythology Care About Good or Bad?". In Allen J. Romano; John Marincola (eds.). Host or Parasite?: Mythographers and their Contemporaries in the Classical and Hellenistic Periods. Vol. 92. De Gruyter. ISBN 978-3-11-067279-4.
