= Myrtis of Anthedon =

Ancient Greek poet

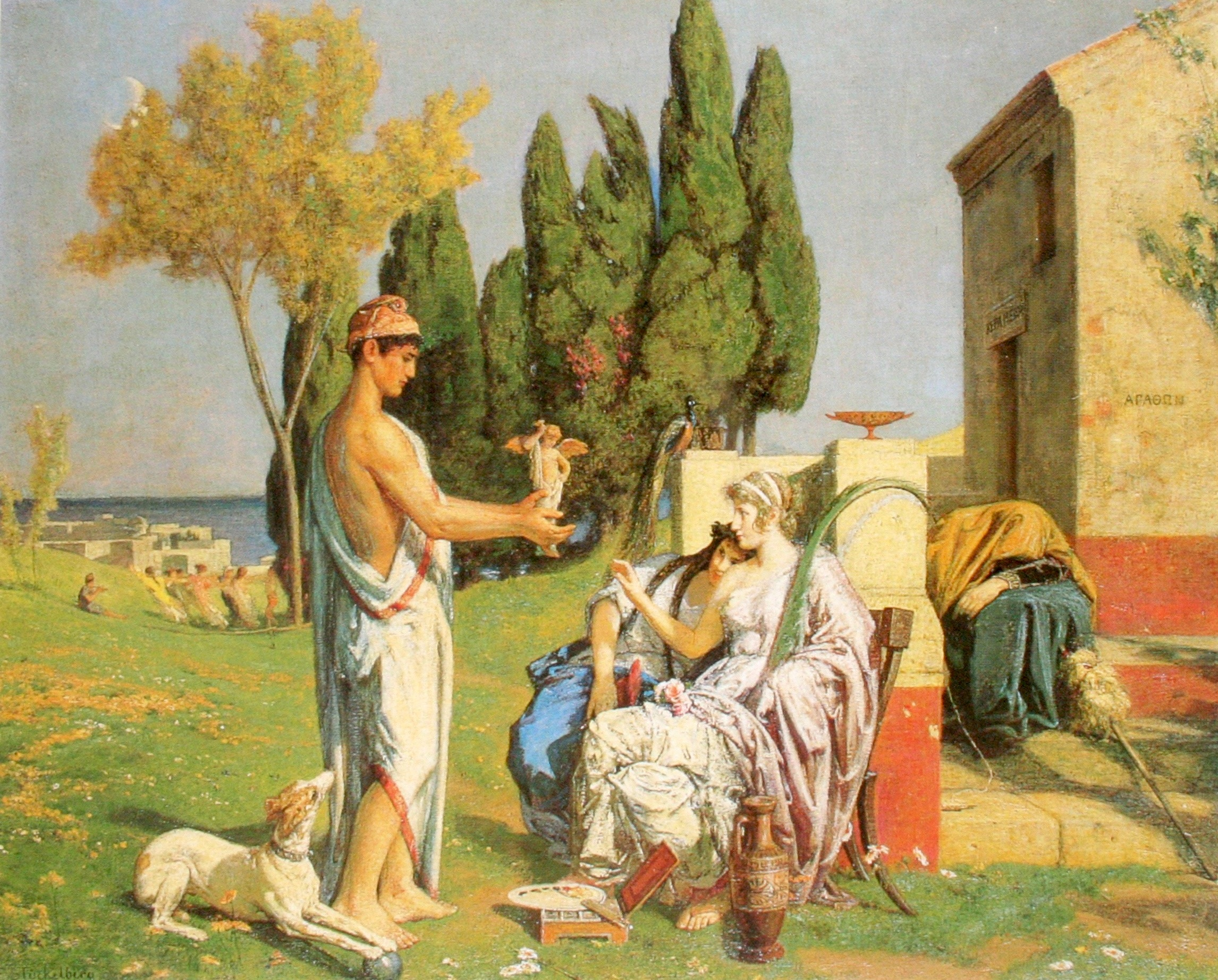
Myrtis and Corinna with the Potter Agathon by Ernst Stückelberg, 1897

Myrtis (Ancient Greek: Μύρτις; fl. 6th century BC) was an ancient Greek poet from Anthedon, a town in Boeotia. She was said to have taught the poets Pindar and Corinna. The only surviving record of her poetry is a paraphrase by the 1st-century AD historian Plutarch, discussing a local Boeotian legend. In antiquity she was included by the 1st-century BC epigrammatist Antipater of Thessalonica in his canon of nine female poets, and a bronze statue of her was reportedly made by Boïscus, a sculptor about whom nothing more is known. In the modern world, Myrtis has been represented in artworks by Judy Chicago and Anselm Kiefer, and a poem by Michael Longley.

== Life ==
Myrtis was from Anthedon, a small town in Boeotia, and is the earliest poet known to have come from this area of Greece. She lived during the 6th century BC, and was purported to be the teacher of Pindar of Thebes and Corinna of Tanagra. Mieke de Vos argues that the fragment of Corinna's poetry which mentions Myrtis, criticising her for competing with Pindar, seems to contradict this tradition and positions Corinna and Myrtis as equals.

== Poetry ==
Myrtis is the most obscure of the nine female poets included in the 1st-century BC epigrammatist Antipater of Thessalonica's canon. (Note: The other poets included in Antipater's list are Sappho, Corinna, Telesilla, Praxilla, Erinna, Anyte, Nossis, and Moero.) All that is known of her poetry can be surmised from Plutarch's paraphrase of one of her poems. Plutarch cites Myrtis, whom he describes as a lyric poet, as the source for the story that explained why women were forbidden to set foot in a sacred grove dedicated to a local hero, Eunostos, in Tanagra. In the story, a woman named Ochna, Eunostos' cousin, was rejected by him and so falsely told her brothers that Eunostos had raped her. The brothers killed Eunostus but were then taken captive by his father. Ochna then confessed that she had lied; her brothers were allowed to go into exile, and Ochna jumped off of a cliff to her death. It is unclear whether the whole story given in Plutarch is summarised from Myrtis' poem, or if Plutarch is citing her for a specific detail.

μέμφομη δὲ κὴ λιγουρὰν
Μουρτίδ' ἱώνγ' ὅτι βανὰ φοῦ-
σ' ἔβα Πινδάροι πὸτ ἔριν.

— Corinna, fr. 664(a) PMG
Translation:

and I find fault also with clear-voiced Myrtis
in that, a woman, she entered into competition with Pindar.

— Campbell 1992, p. 45

Corinna criticised Myrtis for venturing, as a woman, to compete with Pindar. Criticising other poets was a common trope of Greek lyric poetry – for example Pindar himself criticised Archilochus – but the meaning of Corinna's reproach to Myrtis is uncertain. It might have referred to Myrtis entering a poetry contest, although that interpretation would appear to contradict the tradition, known from other sources, that Corinna herself defeated Pindar in such a contest. Alternatively, it might reflect similarities between Pindar's and Myrtis's poetry in genre, style, or subject matter. Perhaps Myrtis therefore wrote on Panhellenic rather than local myths, though the poem described by Plutarch is of local interest and does not reflect this. Diane Rayor suggests that Corinna's criticism of Myrtis was due to her poetry being about male heroes, or for a male audience.

== Reception ==
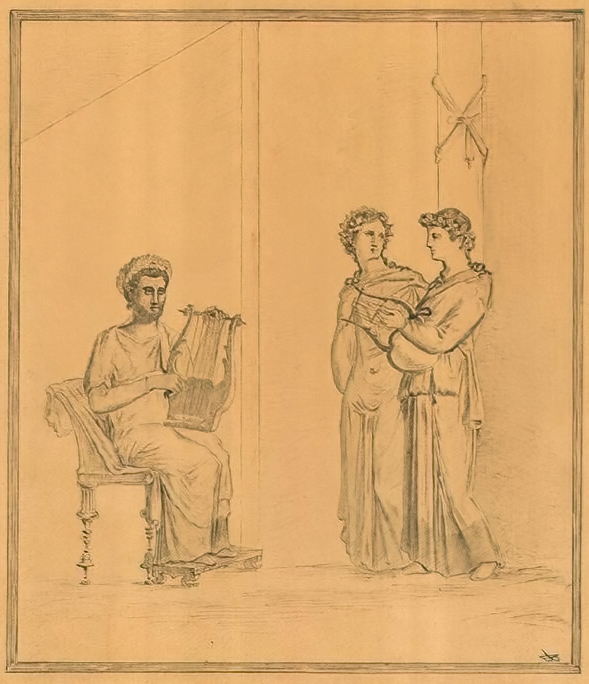
Sketch recording a now-lost fresco from Pompeii, believed to show Corinna, Pindar, and Myrtis

Myrtis was called "sweet-sounding" by Antipater of Thessalonica, who includes her in his canon of nine female poets, and "clear-voiced" by Corinna. Tatian, a 2nd-century AD travelling rhetorician and Christian apologist, said that a bronze statue of Myrtis was made by the sculptor Boïscus, otherwise unknown, which he saw at the Portico of Pompey in Rome. A fresco from Pompeii, now lost, is thought to show Corinna, Pindar, and Myrtis. Myrtis seems to have been forgotten after the 2nd century AD.

In the modern world, an 1897 painting by the Swiss artist Ernst Stückelberg, Myrtis and Corinna with the Potter Agathon, depicts her. She is included on Judy Chicago's Heritage Floor, associated with the place-setting for Sappho in The Dinner Party. She is also depicted in Anselm Kiefer's series of sculptures, Women of Antiquity. Myrtis is one of the poets featured in Michael Longley's poem "The Group", published in the collection Snow Water.
