= Ochne =

Woman in Greek mythology

In Greek mythology, Ochne (Ancient Greek: Ὄχνη, romanized: Ókhnē, lit. 'pear tree'), also romanised as Ochna, is a young Boeotian maiden who fell in love with the local hero Eunostus, who was also her cousin. When he rejected her romantic advances, Ochne went to her three brothers and accused him of rape, which prompted them to ambush and kill Eunostus, filling Ochne with regret and shame, which led to her taking her life. Her brief tale is preserved in the writings of Plutarch, a Greek writer of the Roman era.

== Etymology ==
The ancient Greek feminine noun ὄχνη is a later spelling of the word ὄγχνη (ónkhnē), meaning pear tree. The word might be connected to ἔγχος (énkhos), meaning lance (as in a lance of pearwood), although this remains an uncertain guess; otherwise it is perhaps of pre-Greek origin.

== Family ==
Ochne was the daughter of Colonus by an unknown mother and sister to Echemus, Leon and Bucolus. She was also cousins with Eunostus.

== Mythology ==
The Tanagran Ochne fell in love with her cousin Eunostus, a young hero who was very handsome and virtuous. She confessed her love to him, and not only he rebuffed her advances repulsed, but also decided to report her behaviour to her three brothers, Echemus, Leon and Bucolus. In fear of her enamorment being made known to her family, Ochne thwarted Eunostus's plans by reaching her brothers first and falsely accusing him of forcing himself on her, and then urged them to kill him in revenge.

The brothers were enraged and lay in ambush in order to surprise and slay Eunostus. Eunostus's father Elieus however found out the identities of his son's killers, arrested all three and put them in bonds, which filled the remorseful Ochne with terror. Pitying her brothers and wanting to rid herself of her love-caused torments, she went willingly to Elieus and confessed her crime, and he in turn informed her father Colonus. Colonus decided to banish all three of his sons, while Ochne took her life by jumping from a cliff to her death.

== Background ==
The story is related by Roman-era Greek philosopher Plutarch in his Moralia, who gives it as the reason why women were not allowed to enter the sacred shrine and grove of Eunostus, not even in the case of an earthquake. He attributes the story to Myrtis of Anthedon, an ancient Greek poetess of the sixth century BC. It is unclear whether Myrtis is meant to be the source of the entire story, or Plutarch is citing her just for a specific detail of his summary.

The myth is one of several examples of the popular 'Potiphar's wife' archetype found in Greek mythology and other folklore in which a woman, usually an already married one, tries and fails to seduce a man and then attempts to accuse him of assault, usually out of fear of being reported to their male relatives. The most famous example is that of Hippolytus and Phaedra, the son and wife of the Athenian hero Theseus respectively.

Ὄχνη is the ancient Greek word for pear, while her Colonus shares his name with an ancient deme in nearby Athens, perhaps an indication of the cultivation of pears in the region; pears were also considered to be sacred to Aphrodite, the Greek goddess of love and beauty.

== See also ==
Other mythological figures who made false sex crimes accusations:

- Astydamia of Iolcus
- Cleoboea
- Stheneboea

== Bibliography ==
- Beekes, Robert S. P. (2010). Lucien van Beek (ed.). Etymological Dictionary of Greek. Leiden Indo-European Etymological Dictionary Series. Vol. 2. Leiden, the Netherlands: Brill Publications. ISBN 978-90-04-17418-4.
- Bell, Robert E. (1991). Women of Classical Mythology: A Biographical Dictionary. ABC-Clio. ISBN 9780874365818.
- de Vos, Mieke (2012). Negen aardse Muzen: Gender en de receptie van dichteressen in het oude Griekenland en Rome (PDF) (Thesis) (in Dutch). Radboud Universiteit Nijmegen.
- Grimal, Pierre (1987). The Dictionary of Classical Mythology. Wiley-Blackwell. ISBN 0-631-13209-0.
- Harmon, Roger (October 1, 2006). "Musicians (female)". In Cancik, Hubert; Schneider, Helmuth (eds.). Brill's New Pauly. Basle: Brill Reference Online. doi:10.1163/1574-9347_bnp_e12224080. ISSN 1574-9347.
- Liddell, Henry George; Scott, Robert (1940). A Greek-English Lexicon, revised and augmented throughout by Sir Henry Stuart Jones with the assistance of Roderick McKenzie. Oxford: Clarendon Press. Online version at Perseus.tufts project.
- Murr, Josef (1890). Die Pflanzenwelt in der griechischen Mythologie [The Plant World in Greek mythology] (in German). Innsbruck.
- Plant, Ian Michael (2004). Women Writers of Ancient Greece and Rome: An Anthology. OK, United States: University of Oklahoma Press. ISBN 0-8061-3621-9.
- Plutarch, Quaestiones Graecae in Moralia, with an English Translation by Frank Cole Babbitt. Cambridge, MA. Harvard University Press. London. William Heinemann Ltd. 1936. Online text available at Perseus.tufts Project.
- Rose, Herbert J. (2004). A Handbook of Greek Mythology (6th ed.). London, New York: Routledge. ISBN 0-415-04601-7.
- Roscher, Wilhelm Heinrich (1909). Ausführliches Lexikon der griechischen und römischen Mythologie [Detailed dictionary of Greek and Roman mythology] (in German). Vol. III: N–P. Leipzig: Teubner-Verlag.
- Trenkner, Sophie (1958). The Greek Novella in the Classical Period. Cambridge, UK: Cambridge University Press. ISBN 978-1-107-43825-5.
