= Amphiaraus (play) =

Lost Greek play by Sophocles

- Original language: Ancient Greek
- Written by: Sophocles
- Chorus: Satyrs (?)
- Characters: Amphiaraus
- Genre: Athenian satyr play

Premiere
- Place: Athens

Amphiaraus (Ancient Greek: Ἀμφιάραος, romanized: Amphiáraos) is a lost Greek play by the Athenian poet Sophocles. It is believed to have been a satyr play, although it is not clear which incident pertaining to the title character was the subject of the play, nor even which incident would lend itself to satyr play treatment. There is also a lost play of Aristophanes by this name.

== Plot ==
One fragment of the play is known to be extant, and was translated by Hugh Lloyd-Jones as "The sentinel crab of this prophetic chorus..." A one-sentence fragment of Sophocles (fragment 958) telling of the death of Amphiaraus – that the ground of Thebes opened up to receive him, his arms, his horses and chariot – is possibly from Amphiaraus also, but may belong to one of several other plays Sophocles wrote about Amphiaraus and his son Alcmaeon. In addition, second century Greek rhetorician Athenaeus noted that within "the satyr play Amphiaraus," Sophocles had a character who "dances the letters." This comment by Athenaeus came after he had noted a number of instances within other plays in which an illiterate character described the letters of a word that he could not read himself, and that the dance by the Sophocles character was "similar."

Within Greek mythology, the title character Amphiaraus had not wanted to take part in an attack against the city of Thebes, led by his wife's brother Adrastus and by Polynices, since Amphiaraus knew the attack was doomed. This attack was dramatized by Aeschylus in his play Seven Against Thebes, and the aftermath was dramatized by Sophocles himself in Antigone. Polynices bribed Amphiaraus' wife Eriphyle, who was also Adrastus' sister, to coerce Amphiaraus to take part in the attack. Amphiaraus had charged their son Alcmaeon to avenge him on Eriphyle, and after Alcmaeon killed Eriphyle, he was pursued by the Erinyes, similar to the fate of Orestes after killing Clytemnestra.

One episode from the myth of Amphiaraus that scholars believe may have lent itself to the plot of this satyr play is the time when Amphiaraus went into hiding to avoid taking part in the attack against Thebes. Another episode that has been postulated as the basis for this play is Amphiaraus role in founding the Nemean Games. Since Sophocles wrote several play involving the myth of Amphiaraus and Alcmaeon, it is possible that Amphiaraus was the satyr play following a connected trilogy related to this myth. If so, the tragedies in the trilogy may have included Eriphyle, Epigoni, in which Alcmaeon kills Eriphyle, and Alcmaeon, which may have involved the sequel to the killing, including the pursuit of Alcmaeon by the Erinyes, his eventual purification, and subsequent death.
