= Iophon =

5th-century BC Greek tragic poet

Iophon (Ancient Greek: Ἰοφῶν, fl. 428 BC – 405 BC) was a Greek tragic poet, son of Sophocles, and brother to Ariston.

Iophon gained the second prize in tragic competition in 428 BC, Euripides being first, and Ion third. He must have been alive in 405 BC, the date of the production of The Frogs of Aristophanes, in which he is spoken of as the only good Athenian tragic poet, although it is hinted that he owed much to his father's assistance. He wrote fifty plays, of which only a few fragments and the following eight titles remain: Achilles, Actaeon, Aulodoi ("The Flute-Singers"), Bacchae, Dexamenus, Iliou Persis ("The Sacking of Troy"), Pentheus, and Telephus.

It is said that Iophon accused his father before the court of the phratores of being incapable of managing his affairs, so that he might gain the guardianship of his father's fortune. Sophocles replied to this charge by reading the chorus of the Oedipus at Colonus (688 ff.), which he was currently writing. The piece so proved that he was still in possession of all his mental faculties that he was acquitted.
