= Ariston (son of Sophocles) =

Son of the Greek playwright Sophocles (5th century BCE)

Ariston (Ancient Greek: Ἀρίστων) was a son of the renowned playwright of ancient Greece, Sophocles, by Theoris, and brother to Iophon, who was also a playwright. He lived some time in the mid 5th century BCE.

Ariston had a son whom he also named Sophocles, who is said to have produced a production of his grandfather's play Oedipus at Colonus in 401 BCE.

Some scholars think he may also have been a writer, though there is not clear consensus on this. Whether he is the same as the Ariston who is called by Diogenes Laërtius a "writer of tragedies", one of whose tragedies was directed against Mnestheus, cannot be said with any certainty, though German scholar Johann Albert Fabricius took this for granted.
