= Kitami Institute of Technology =

National university in Kitami, Hokkaido, Japan

Coordinates: 43.8235981°N 143.9032602°E

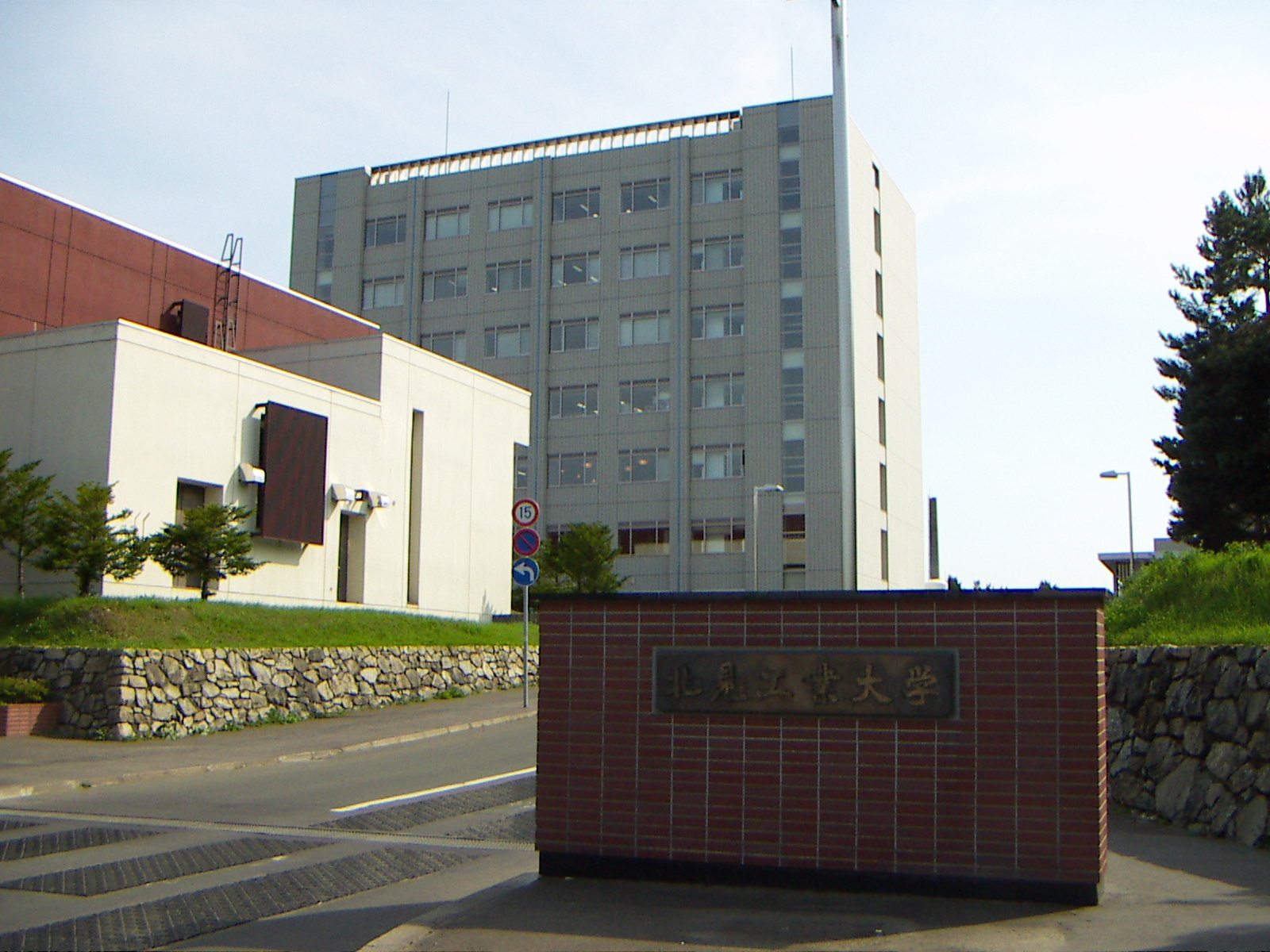
Main gate of Kitami Institute of Technology

Kitami Institute of Technology (北見工業大学, Kitami Kōgyō Daigaku) is a national university in Kitami, Hokkaido, Japan. Founded as the Kitami Junior College of Technology on 6 January 1960, it was chartered as a university (Kitami Institute of Technology) on 6 January 1966. In 2004, it became part of the National University Corporation.

== Notable alumni ==
- Akiko Kiso - classical scholar
