= Akiko Kiso =

Japanese classicist (born 1936)

- 木曽明子
- Born: 1936 (age 89–90); Manchuria
- Occupation: Classical scholar
- Known for: First Japanese scholar to publish on Sophocles.

Academic background
- Education: Kyoto University
- Thesis: The Dissipative Works of Sophocles (1987)
- Academic advisor: Chiaki Matsudaira

Academic work
- Institutions: Osaka University; Kitami Institute of Technology
- Main interests: Sophocles, Greek tragedy, parallels with noh
- Influenced: Mae J. Smethurst

Akiko Kiso (Japanese: 木曽明子; born 1936) is a Japanese classical scholar who specialises in Greek literature. She is a professor emeritus at Osaka University. She is the first Japanese scholar to publish on Sophocles. Her work included reconstructions of the lost plays of Epigoni and Tereus. She also worked on comparative approaches to Greek tragedy with an emphasis on Japanese classical drama.

== Biography ==
Kiso was born in Manchuria in 1936. In 1987, she completed her PhD in the Faculty of Letters, at Kyoto University, with a dissertation entitled The Dissipative Works of Sophocles. She is a former student of Chiaki Matsudaira (jp). Until 1997, she worked as a professor in the Faculty of Liberal Arts at Osaka University. She then was appointed professor at Kitami Institute of Technology before retiring in 2002. The same year, she returned to Osaka University as emeritus Professor.

Kiso, an expert on Sophocles, was the first Japanese scholar to publish his works. In 1984, Kiso published The Lost Sophocles, which reconsidered fragments of Sophocles' lost works. It included reconstructions of Epigoni and Tereus. The book also argued that since Odysseus appears in many fragments of lost plays, Sophocles must have favoured him as a character to write about. This work has been discussed in relation to Athena and justice by Rebecca Futo Kennedy. Justina Gregory described it as a work that "created fresh questions" about the use of the Sophoclean fragments.

Kiso significantly collaborated with Mae J. Smethurst, an American scholar of classical literature, first translating The Artistry of Aeschylus and Zeami into Japanese. Subsequently, she advised on Smethurst's Dramatic Action in Greek Tragedy and Noh: Reading with and Beyond Aristotle, as well as translating it into Japanese. This work compares the Greek tragedy form of theatre with the noh, a Japanese form of dance drama.

== Selected works ==
- Kiso, Akiko. "From Tragedy to Comedy The Dramaturgy of Euripides' Ion." 西洋古典論集 14 (1996): 131–136.
- Kiso, Akiko. "The Artistry of Aeschylus and Zeami: A Comparative Study of Greek Tragedy and No." The American Journal of Philology (1991): 552–555.
- The Lost Sophocles (New York: Vantage Press, 1984)
- Kiso, Akiko. "Notes on Sophocles' Epigoni." Greek, Roman, and Byzantine Studies 18.3 (1977): 207-226.
- Kiso, Akiko. "Sophocles, Aleadae: a Reconstruction." Greek, Roman, and Byzantine Studies 17.1 (1976): 5-21.
- Kiso, Akiko. "Sophocles' "Phaedra" and the Phaedra of the "First Hippolytus"." Bulletin of the Institute of Classical Studies 20 (1973): 22–36.
