= Epigoni (play) =

Tragedy by Sophocles

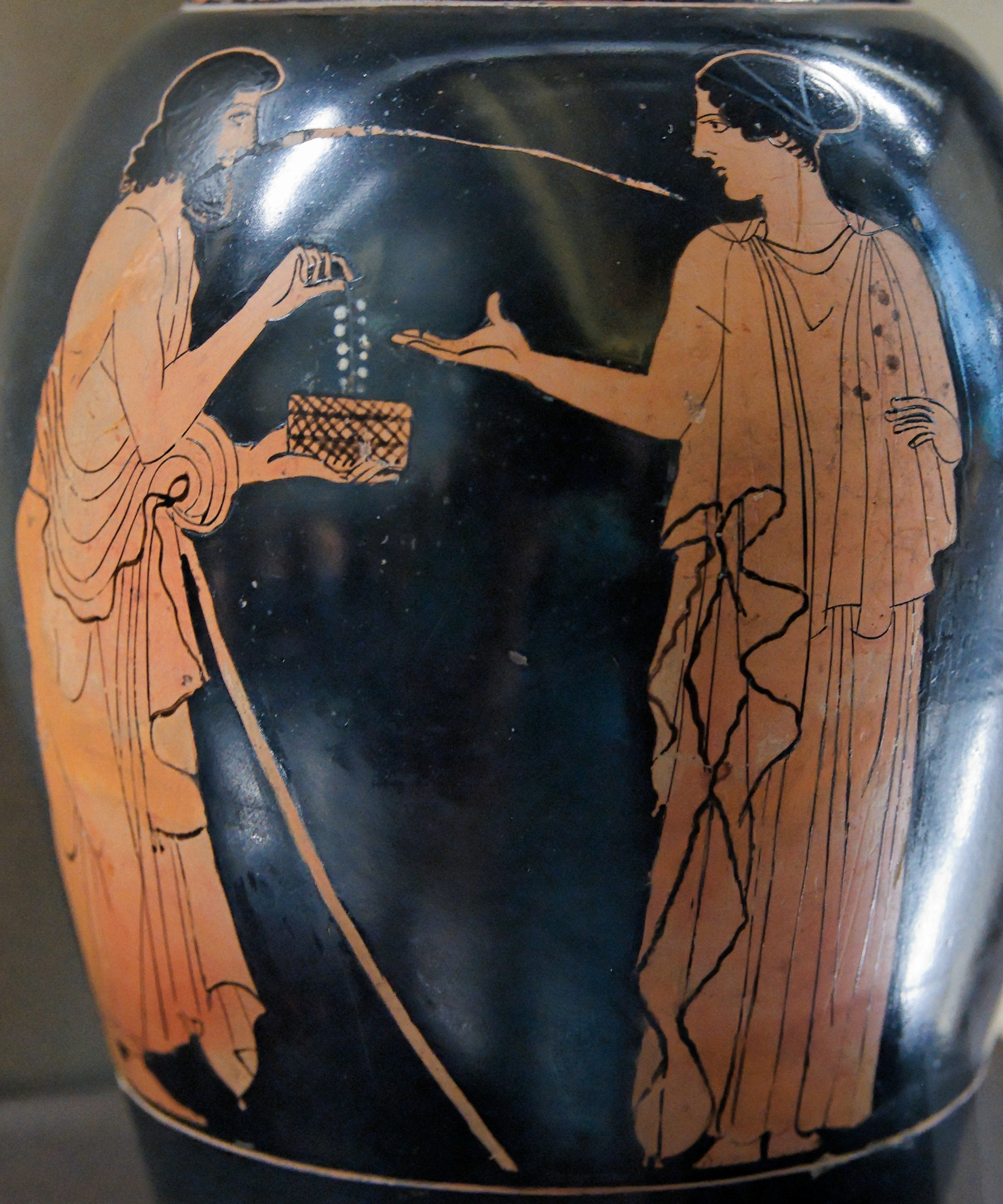
- Eriphyle being bribed by Polynices to coerce her husband Amphiaraus to partake in the war against Thebes. Their son Alcmaeon apparently avenged Amphiaraus as part of the plot of Epigoni.
- Original language: Ancient Greek
- Written by: Sophocles
- Genre: Athenian tragedy

The Epigoni (Ancient Greek: Ἐπίγονοι, Epigonoi, "progeny") is an ancient Greek tragedy written by the Greek playwright Sophocles in the 5th century BC and based on Greek mythology.

== Plot ==
According to myth, Polynices and the Seven against Thebes attacked Thebes because Polynices' brother, Eteocles, refused to give up the throne as promised. All but one (Adrastus) of the seven would-be conquerors were killed. Their children swore vengeance and attacked Thebes. This was called the war of the Epigonoi ("the offspring, the next generation"); the story had been told, before Sophocles, in the lost epic Epigonoi. These Epigonoi defeated and killed (or drove out) Laodamas, son of Eteocles, and conquered Thebes, installing Thersander on the throne. All of the Epigonoi but Aegialeus, the son of Adrastus, or else Alcmaeon, son of Amphiaraus, survived this battle.

Amphiaraus knew that the original attack against Thebes was doomed to fail and that he did not want to partake, but he was coerced to do so by his wife Eriphyle, who had been bribed by Polynices. Amphiaraus had instructed his son Alcmaeon to avenge him against his mother, and Alcmaeon killed her, either before or after the war of the Epigonoi, depending on the version of the myth. Alcmaeon was then pursued by the Erinyes, similar to Orestes' fate after killing his mother Clytemnestra.

== Rediscovery in 2005 ==
The play was lost for centuries, except for a few fragments, but in April 2005, classicists at Oxford University, employing infrared technology previously used for satellite imaging, discovered additional fragments of it in the Oxyrhynchus Papyri. The fragment translates to the following:

Speaker A: … gobbling the whole, sharpening the flashing iron.
Speaker B: And the helmets are shaking their purple-dyed crests, and for the wearers of breast-plates the weavers are striking up the wise shuttle's songs, that wake up those who are asleep.
Speaker A: And he is gluing together the chariot's rail.

Several fragments had been definitively assigned to Epigoni prior to this find. One was translated by Hugh Lloyd-Jones as "Most calamitous of sons, what a word have you uttered." This was apparently stated by Eriphyle to Alcmaeon shortly before he killed her. Another fragment has a similar theme: "O woman whose shamelessness has stopped at nothing and has gone yet further, no other evil is or ever will be worse than a woman who was born to give pain to mortals."

Another fragment presents an exchange between Alcmaeon and Adrastus, Eriphyle's brother and thus Alcmaeon's uncle. In this exchange Alcmaeon remarks that Adrastus "is the brother of a woman who killed her husband." Adrastus retorts by accusing Alcmaeon of murdering "the mother who gave [him] birth." A remark in Philodemus' book about music leads scholars to believe that the dispute between Alcmaeon and Adrastus was somehow resolved through the power of music.

Another fragment posits the view that "for victims of envy find that ill repute wins out over shameful rather than over honorable actions." An additional fragment notes that someone (unnamed in the fragment) will no longer live in Argos.

In addition to the fragments assigned to Epigoni, there are seven extant fragments assigned to a play by Sophocles entitled Eriphyle. Many scholars believe that Eriphyle is just an alternate title for Epigoni, in which case these seven fragments would apply to Epigoni. These fragments include such advice as (again as translated by Lloyd-Jones) "Maintain restraint in speech, as is proper to old age," and "The only possessions that are permanent are those of excellence." However, it is possible that Eriphyle is a separate play from Epigoni, in which case it is possible that both were part of a connected trilogy, with the other tragic play in the trilogy being Alcmaeon and the satyr play being Amphiaraus.

There are other fragments that may belong to Epigoni, but these are uncertain. For example, a one sentence fragment of Sophocles (fragment 958) telling of the death of Amphiaraus – that the ground of Thebes opened up to receive him and his arms and his horses and chariot – has been variously assigned to Epigoni, Eriphyle, Alcmaeon or to Amphiaraus.

An expert on Sophocles, Akiko Kiso was the first Japanese scholar to publish his works. In 1984, Kiso published The Lost Sophocles, which reconsidered fragments of Sophocles' lost works. It included reconstructions of Epigoni and Tereus.
