= Stheneboea (play) =

Lost tragedy by Euripides

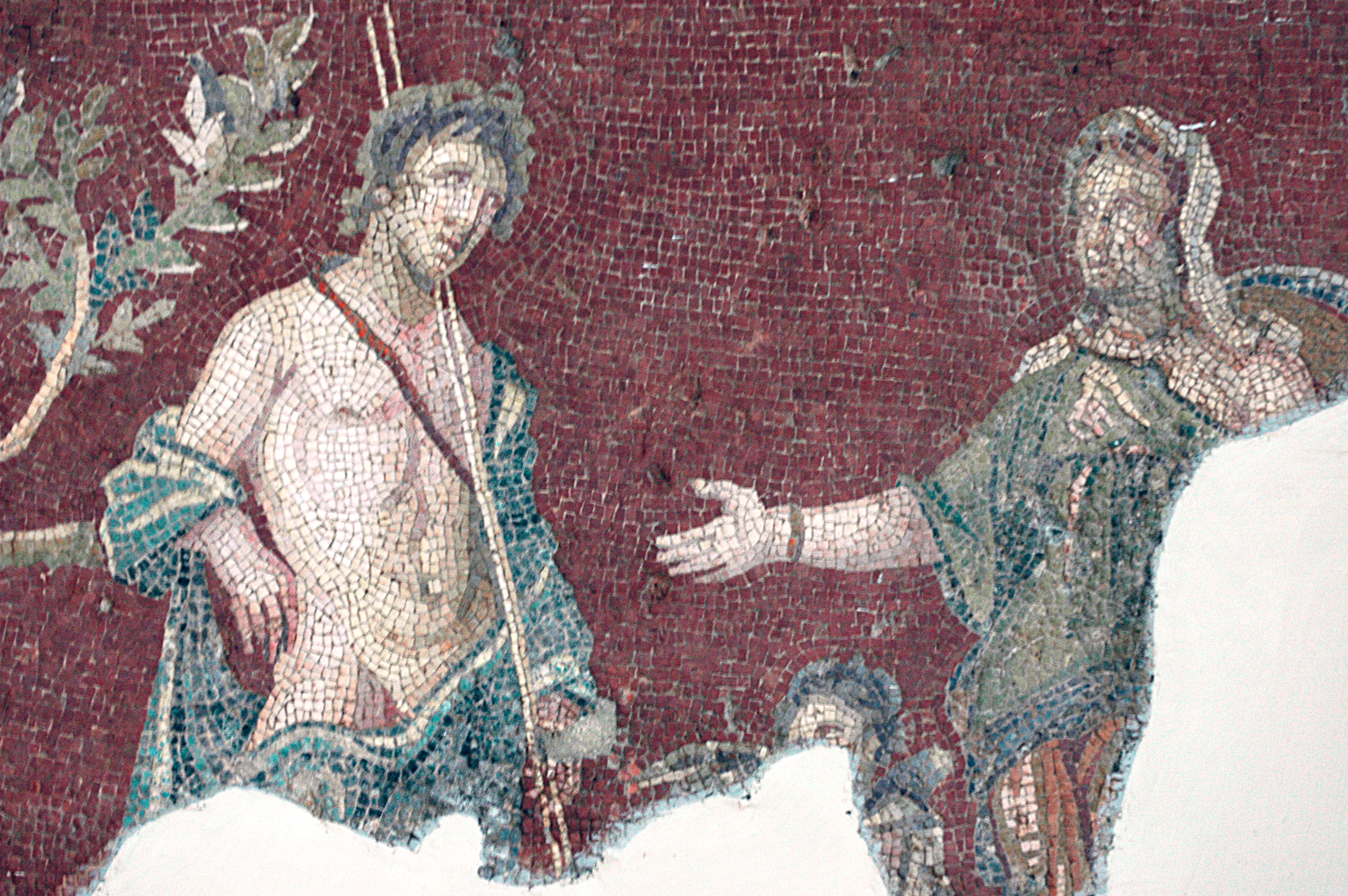
- Bellerophon and Stheneboea on a Roman mosaic from Antioch
- Original language: Ancient Greek
- Written by: Euripides
- Chorus: Tirynthian women?
- Characters: Stheneboea; Bellerophon; Proetus; Messenger; Nurse ?
- Subject: Myth of Bellerophon
- Genre: Greek tragedy
- Setting: Tiryns

Premiere
- Date: No later than 422 BC; perhaps before 429 BC
- Place: Athens

Stheneboea (Ancient Greek: Σθενέβοια) is an ancient Greek tragedy that has been lost except for some brief fragments. It was written by Euripides, a fifth-century BC Athenian playwright and just one of the three tragedians with surviving works. It dramatised the myth of Stheneboea, the Argive queen who fell in love with the hero Bellerophon. Bellerophon rejected her advances, so she falsely accused him to her husband Proetus of attempting to rape her. Proetus then sent Bellerophon away to fight the monstrous Chimera. The play ended with Bellerophon's revenge against the king and queen.

It is not known what year Stheneboea was produced, which plays concluded the tetralogy or what place it got in the contest.

== The play and the myth ==
Early accounts of the myth are sparse, but one is found in Homer's Iliad, where the hero Bellerophon went to Argos, seat of king Proetus, but his wife (whom Homer calls Antea) tried to seduce him. Being gallant and honourable, he refused, but Antea falsely accused him to Proetus of trying to rape her, and urged her husband to kill their guest. Proetus could not do such thing, so he bid Bellerophon to carry a message to his father-in-law Iobates, a message that instructed the king to kill the messenger. Iobates sent Bellerophon to slay the Chimera in hopes he would die, and when he triumphed he gave him a number of other trials as well until he gave up for Bellerophon constantly emerged victorious.

Although Proetus was traditionally the king of Argos, Euripides transferred the action from Argos to Tiryns. The identity of the chorus is not made clear in the fragments, but it was possibly Tirynthian women. The dating is unclear; Aristophanes referenced it in 422 BC making this the absolute latest possible date, but it is potentially earlier than 429 BC if another instance of comedic parody of Euripides was also about this play.

== Plot ==
The plot of Stheneboea is known thanks to its ancient hypothesis, preserved on a papyrus. When Bellerophon arrived in the court of king Proetus in Tiryns, his wife Stheneboea made moves on him, but he spurned her. Stheneboea accused him of seduction to Proetus, who sent him to Iobates in Lycia with a message for him, and he made Bellerophon kill the Chimera. Bellerophon was victorious and returned back to Tiryns; there he pretended that he did reciprocate Stheneboea's love after all, and she revealed to him Proetus' second plot against him. Bellerophon and Stheneboea rode away on the flying horse Pegasus, but as they were flying above the island of Melos, he threw her overboard and she drowned. Bellerophon then went to Tiryns for a third time, and confessed his actions to Proetus. Some fishermen who had found the body brought it to the king.

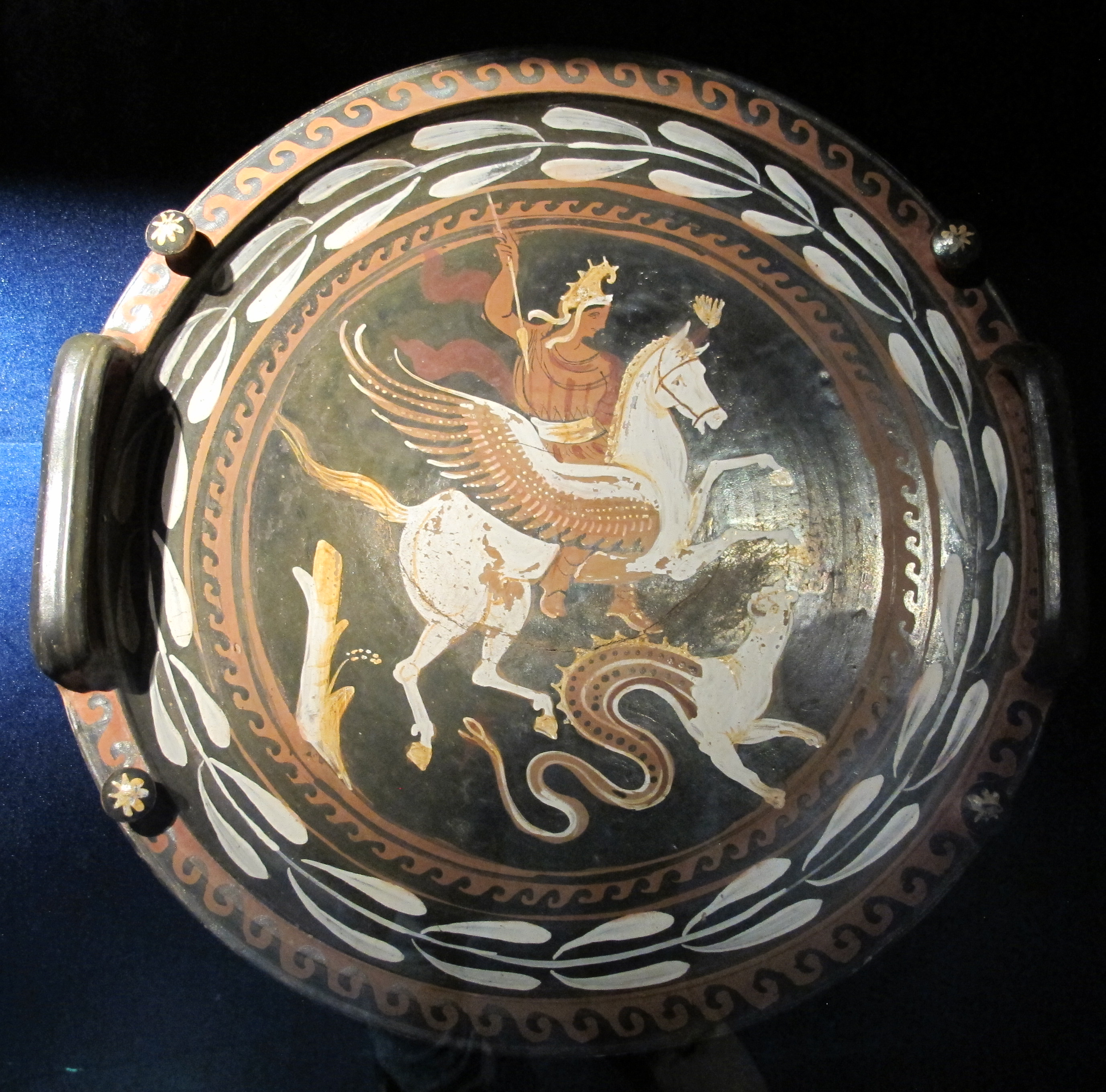
Bellerophon and Pegasus on an Apulian 4th-century BC plate, National Roman Museum.

The first thirty lines of the play were handed down by medieval scholar Ioannes Logothetes, in which Bellerophon makes a speech beginning with a maxim 'There is no man who is fortunate in all respects.' He then explains how he came to Tiryns to be purified of some murder he committed back in his native Corinth, and how Stheneboea and her nurse tried multiple times to get him to consort with the queen, an offer he denied not wanting to disrespect his host. He then expresses the need to escape the household where he is being ill-treated.

Nothing survives between the prologue and Bellerophon's return after he was done with the monster. Presumably Stheneboea and her nurse schemed together and made the accusation to Proetus, which might have been off-stage. Proetus, believing them, sent Bellerophon to Iobates pretending that nothing had happened; Bellerophon likely had no idea about the machinations against him at that point. Although Bellerophon's mission would have taken months in real life, the disbelief-suspending nature of theatre allowed departure from real-life congruence. Bellerophon's acquisition of Pegasus was probably understood as the reason his missions were shorter. (Note: It is possible that Pegasus appeared twice in the drama, before the dramatic climax. His appearance might have been on the flying-machine, or alternatively a real horse with artificial wings or just Bellerophon shouting off-stage so that his spectacular equestrian appearance in the finale would not be weakened.) Fitting this many plot-points into a single episodic drama has been described as 'difficult', as Bellerophon has two absences. Zühlke and Jouan proposed that his first absence and slaying of the Chimera happened in the backstory and was narrated in the prologue, but the theory has been rejected by others.

Next, fragments show Bellerophon's return and his narration of the events with the Chimera. He reproaches Proetus and accuses Stheneboea, having already realised the plot against him, but also learns about Proetus' further plans (Note: It is not clear how he learnt that. One of the hypotheses writes 'from him', but it cannot be Proetus. It has been corrected to 'from someone' or 'from her' meaning Stheneboea, though this is also unlikely unless Stheneboea felt remorse or tried to seduce Bellerophon one more time.) so he announces his love for her and tricks her to ride on Pegasus with her. The two on Pegasus—accomplished with the use of the flying-machine—would have been a stunning spectacle for the ancient audience. A messenger, one of the fishermen, then described the events leading to Stheneboea's death to the king. Bellerophon again returned to Tiryns to justify his punishments of Proetus and Stheneboea, followed by the arrival of the queen's lifeless body. Proetus then says 'Take her indoors! No sensible man should ever trust a woman,' possibly the closing maxim, paralleling the opening one as condemnation of wicked women.

== Parallels and reception ==
Stheneboea was one of the Euripidean tragedies that received criticism for its portrayal of 'wicked women', along with his first Hippolytus, which also deals with an older woman's false rape charge against a younger man who rejected her. Aristophanes calls both Stheneboea and Phaedra whores and a bad moral example for the audience. Like Phaedra, Stheneboea is sinful and vindictive in her passion, the popular 'Potiphar's wife' motif.

Those two myths, and the three Euripidean plays dramatising them, had several parallels such as the false accusation, a misleading letter, the sea-related death, the depiction of love as a form of madness and a nurse who helps her mistress. Several differences however also occur when it comes to characterisation; Stheneboea actively pursues Bellerophon unlike the Phaedra of the second Hippolytus (but similar to the first one's), while chaste Hippolytus is very unlike Bellerophon, who shuns Stheneboea on account of her stupidity and murders her in revenge, whereas Hippolytus' integrity costs him his life. The version of Stheneboea killing herself which is found in much later texts might have been inspired by Phaedra's portrayal in Hippolytus. It is not known whether Euripides is innovating with Stheneboea's death from above, or following an established version.

About twelve vase-paintings made around a century later, mostly from South Italy, depict scenes from Bellerophon's myth that are possibly based on Euripides' account, though their dependence on him is not a given. Sculptural evidence are also extant.

== See also ==
Other plays with similar plots:

- Phaedra (Sophocles)
- Phaedra (Seneca)
- Anthos

== Bibliography ==
- Bell, Robert E. (1991). Women of Classical Mythology: A Biographical Dictionary. ABC-Clio. ISBN 9780874365818.
- Collard, Christopher; Cropp, Martin, eds. (2009). Euripides Fragments: Oedipus-Chrysippus, Other Fragments. Loeb Classical Library 506. Cambridge, MA: Harvard University Press. ISBN 978-0-674-99631-1.
- Collard, Christopher; Cropp, Martin; Lee, K.H., eds. (1995). Euripides: Selected Fragmentary Plays. Vol. I. UK, USA: Oxbow Books. ISBN 978-0-85668-619-1.
- Cropp, Martin; Fick, G. (1985). Resolutions and Chronology in Euripides: The Fragmentary Tragedies. Institute of Classical Studies. ISBN 0-900587-46-6.
- Gantz, Timothy (1993). Early Greek Myth: A Guide to Literary and Artistic Sources. Vol. I. Johns Hopkins University Press. ISBN 978-0-8018-5360-9.
- Homer, The Iliad with an English Translation by A. T. Murray, PhD in two volumes. Cambridge, MA., Harvard University Press; London, William Heinemann, Ltd. 1924. Online version at the Perseus Digital Library.
- Papamichael, Emmanuel Michael (1983). "Bellerophon and Stheneboea (or Anteia)" (PDF). Dodone. 12.
- Wright, Matthew (2019). The Lost Plays of Greek Tragedy. Vol. 2: Aeschylus, Sophocles and Euripides. London, UK: Bloomsbury Academic. ISBN 978-1-4742-7646-7.
