= Sophocles =

5th-century BC Athenian tragic playwright

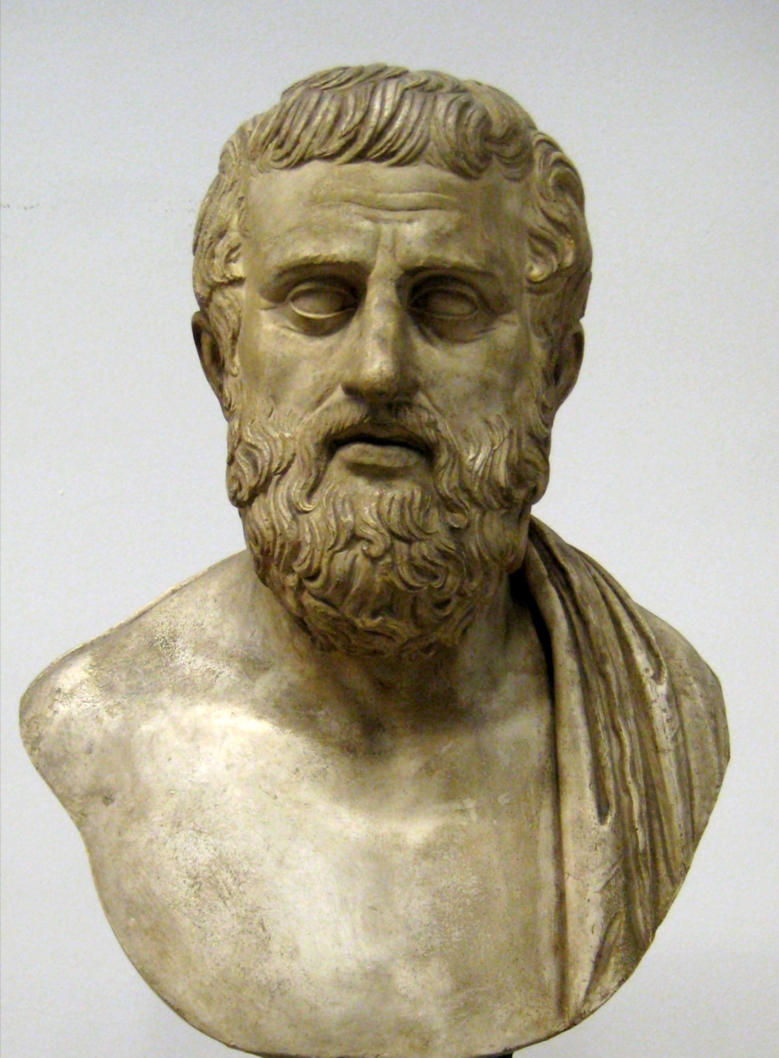
- Born: 497/496 BC; Colonus, Attica
- Died: 406/405 BC (aged 90–92); Athens
- Occupation: Tragedian
- Writing career
- Genre: Tragedy
- Notable works: Ajax; Antigone; Oedipus Rex; Electra; Oedipus at Colonus

Sophocles (/ˈsɒfəkliːz/; Ancient Greek: Σοφοκλῆς, pronounced [so.pʰo.klɛ̂ːs], Sophoklễs; c. 497/496 – winter 406/405 BC) was an ancient Greek tragedian, one of three from whom at least two plays have survived in full. His first plays were written later than, or contemporary with, those of Aeschylus and earlier than, or contemporary with, those of Euripides. Sophocles wrote more than 120 plays, but only seven have survived in a complete form: Ajax, Antigone, Women of Trachis, Oedipus Rex, Electra, Philoctetes, and Oedipus at Colonus. For almost 50 years, Sophocles was the most celebrated playwright in the dramatic competitions of the city-state of Athens, which took place during the religious festivals of the Lenaea and the Dionysia. He competed in 30 competitions, won 24, and was never judged lower than second place. Aeschylus won 13 competitions and was sometimes beaten by Sophocles; Euripides won four.

The most famous tragedies of Sophocles feature Oedipus and Antigone: they are generally known as the Theban plays, though each was part of a different tetralogy (the other members of which are now lost). Sophocles influenced the development of drama, most importantly by adding a third actor (attributed to Sophocles by Aristotle; to Aeschylus by Themistius), thereby reducing the importance of the chorus in the presentation of the plot. He also developed his characters to a greater extent than earlier playwrights.

== Life ==
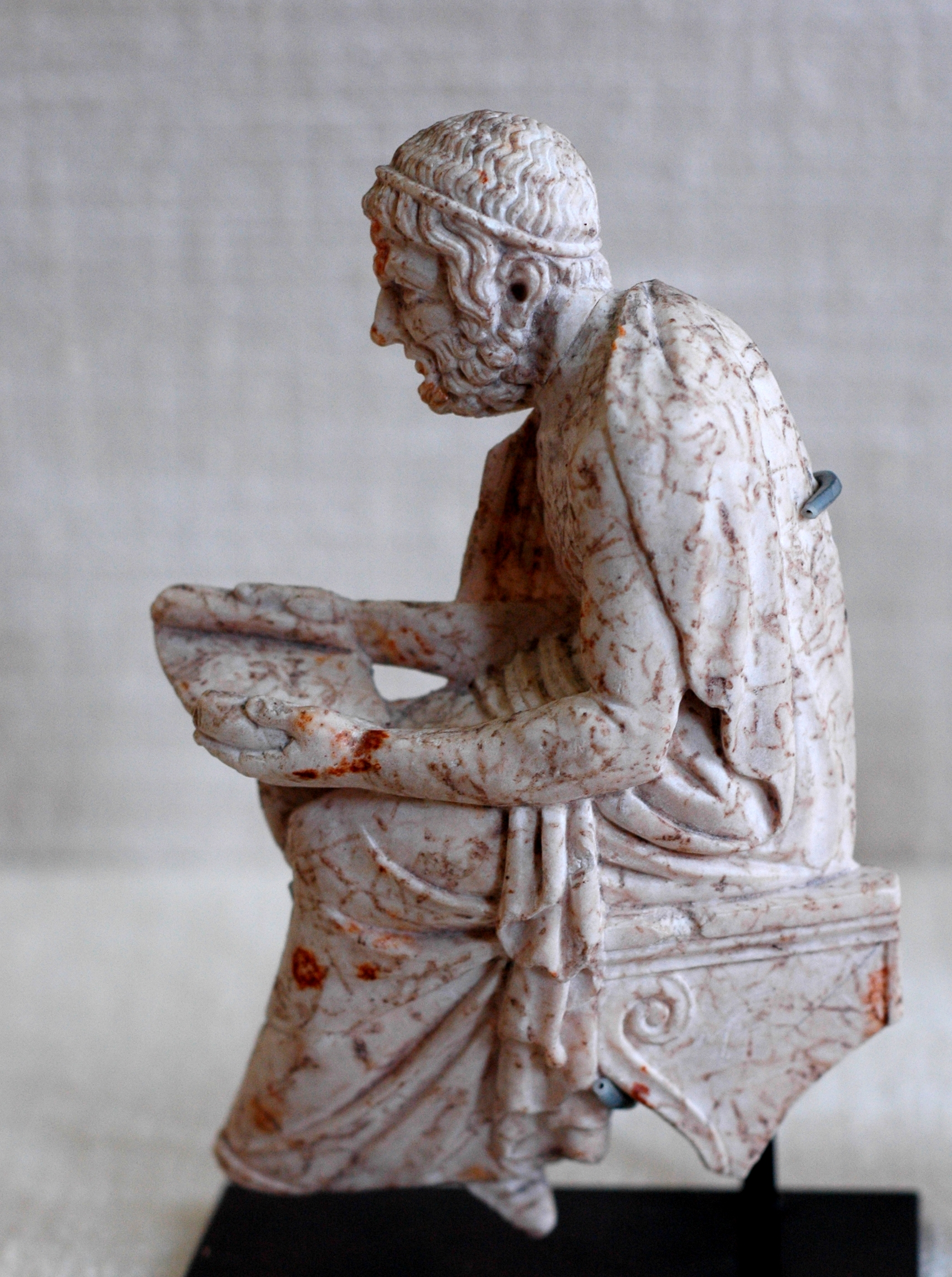
A marble relief of a poet, perhaps Sophocles

Sophocles, the son of Sophillus, was a wealthy member of the rural deme (small community) of Hippeius Colonus in Attica, which was to become a setting for his play Oedipus at Colonus. He was also probably born there, a few years before the Battle of Marathon in 490 BC: the exact year is unclear, but 496/7 is most likely. He was born into a wealthy family (his father was an armour manufacturer) and was highly educated. His first artistic triumph was in 468 BC, when he took first prize in the Dionysia, beating the reigning master of Athenian drama, Aeschylus. According to Plutarch, the victory came under unusual circumstances: instead of following the usual custom of choosing judges by lot, the archon asked Cimon, and the other strategoi present, to decide the victor of the contest. Plutarch further contends that, following this loss, Aeschylus soon left for Sicily. Though Plutarch says that this was Sophocles's first production, it is now thought that his first production was probably in 470 BC. Triptolemus was perhaps one of the plays that Sophocles presented at this festival.

In 480 BC, Sophocles was chosen to lead the paean (a choral chant to a god), celebrating the Greek victory over the Persians at the Battle of Salamis. Early in his career, the politician Cimon might have been one of his patrons, but if he was, there was no ill will borne by Pericles, Cimon's rival, when Cimon was ostracized in 461 BC. In 443/2, Sophocles served as one of the Hellenotamiai, or treasurers of Athena, helping to manage the finances of the city during the political ascendancy of Pericles. In 441 BC, according to the Vita Sophoclis, he was elected one of the ten generals, executive officials at Athens, as a junior colleague of Pericles; and he served in the Athenian campaign against Samos. He was supposed to have been elected to this position due to his production of Antigone, but the classicist Hugh Lloyd-Jones calls this "most improbable".

In 420 BC, he was chosen to receive the image of Asclepius in his own house when the cult was being introduced to Athens and lacked a proper place (τέμενος). For this, the Athenians gave him the posthumous epithet Dexion (receiver). But "some doubt attaches to this story". He was also elected, in 411 BC, one of the commissioners (probouloi) who responded to the catastrophic destruction of the Athenian expeditionary force in Sicily during the Peloponnesian War.

Sophocles died at the age of 90 or 91 in the winter of 406/5 BC, having seen, within his lifetime, both the Greek triumph in the Persian Wars and the bloodletting of the Peloponnesian War. As with many famous men in classical antiquity, his death inspired a number of apocryphal stories. One claimed that he died from the strain of trying to recite a long sentence from his Antigone without pausing to take a breath. Another account suggests he choked while eating grapes at the Anthesteria festival in Athens. A third holds that he died of happiness after winning his final victory at the City Dionysia. A few months later, a comic poet, in a play titled The Muses, wrote this eulogy: "Blessed is Sophocles, who had a long life, was a man both happy and talented, and the writer of many good tragedies; and he ended his life well without suffering any misfortune." According to some accounts, however, his own sons tried to have him declared incompetent near the end of his life, and he refuted their charge in court by reading from his new Oedipus at Colonus. One of his sons, Iophon, and a grandson, also named Sophocles (son of Ariston), also became playwrights.

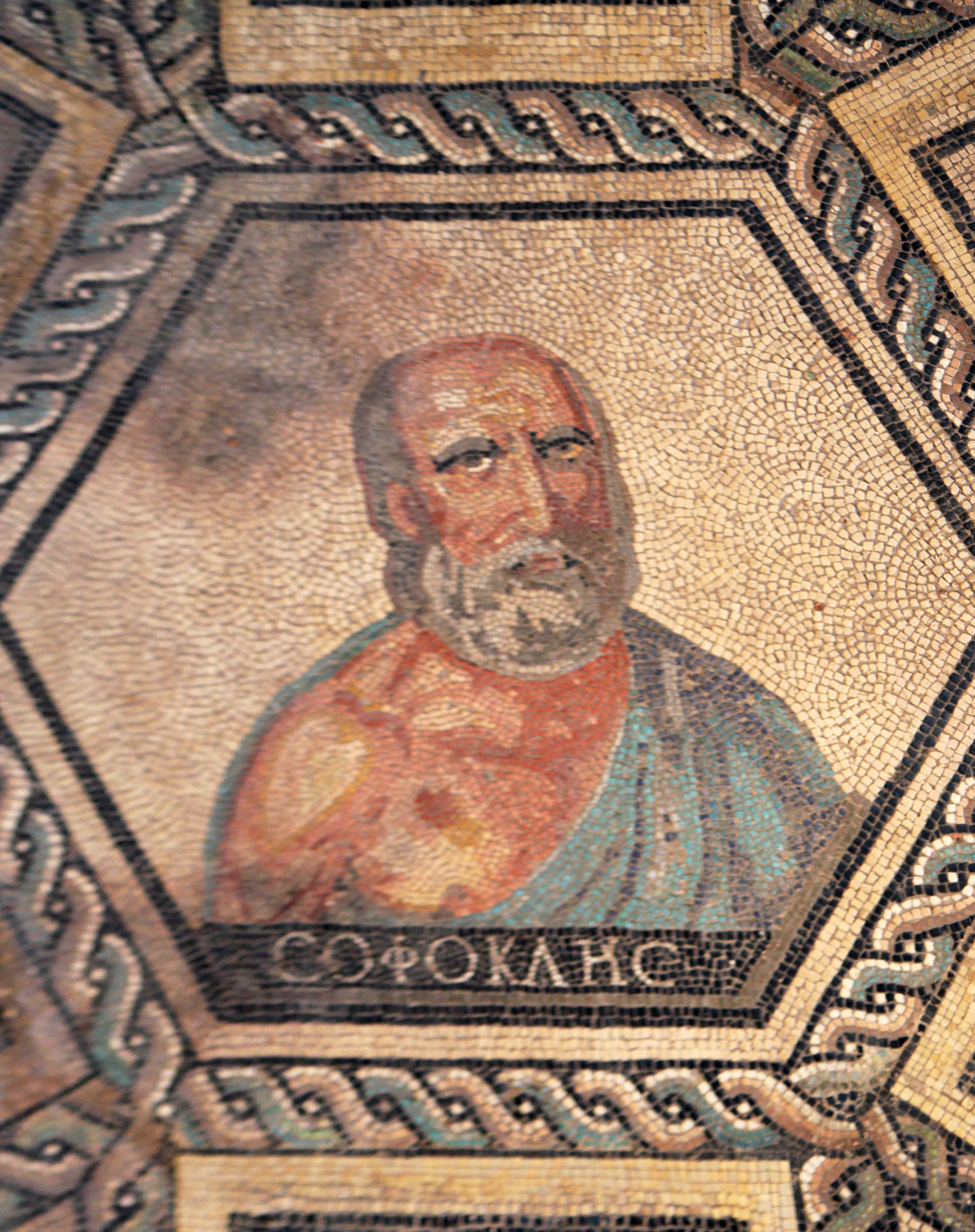
Sophocles, ancient Roman mosaic

An ancient source, Athenaeus's work Sophists at Dinner, contains references to Sophocles's sexuality. In that work, a character named Myrtilus claims that Sophocles "was partial to boys, in the same way that Euripides was partial to women" ("φιλομεῖραξ δὲ ἦν ὁ Σοφοκλῆς, ὡς Εὐριπίδης φιλογύνης"), and relates an anecdote, attributed to Ion of Chios, of Sophocles flirting with a serving-boy at a symposium:

βούλει με ἡδέως πίνειν; [...] βραδέως τοίνυν καὶ πρόσφερέ μοι καὶ ἀπόφερε τὴν κύλικα.
Do you want me to enjoy my drink? [...] Then hand me the cup nice and slow, and take it back nice and slow too.

He also says that Hieronymus of Rhodes, in his Historical Notes, claims that Sophocles once led a boy outside the city walls for sex; and that the boy snatched Sophocles's cloak (χλανίς, khlanis), leaving his own child-sized robe ("παιδικὸν ἱμάτιον") for Sophocles. Moreover, when Euripides heard about this (it was much discussed), he mocked the disdainful treatment, saying that he had himself had sex with the boy, "but had not given him anything more than his usual fee" ("ἀλλὰ μηδὲν προσθεῖναι"), or, "but that nothing had been taken off" ("ἀλλὰ μηδὲν προεθῆναι"). In response, Sophocles composed this elegy:

Ἥλιος ἦν, οὐ παῖς, Εὐριπίδη, ὅς με χλιαίνων
γυμνὸν ἐποίησεν· σοὶ δὲ φιλοῦντι † ἑταίραν †
Βορρᾶς ὡμίλησε. σὺ δ᾿ οὐ σοφός, ὃς τὸν Ἔρωτα,
ἀλλοτρίαν σπείρων, λωποδύτην ἀπάγεις.
It was the Sun, Euripides, and not a boy, that got me hot
and stripped me naked. But the North Wind was with you
when you were kissing † a courtesan †. You're not so clever, if you arrest
Eros for stealing clothes while you're sowing another man's field.

== Works and legacy ==
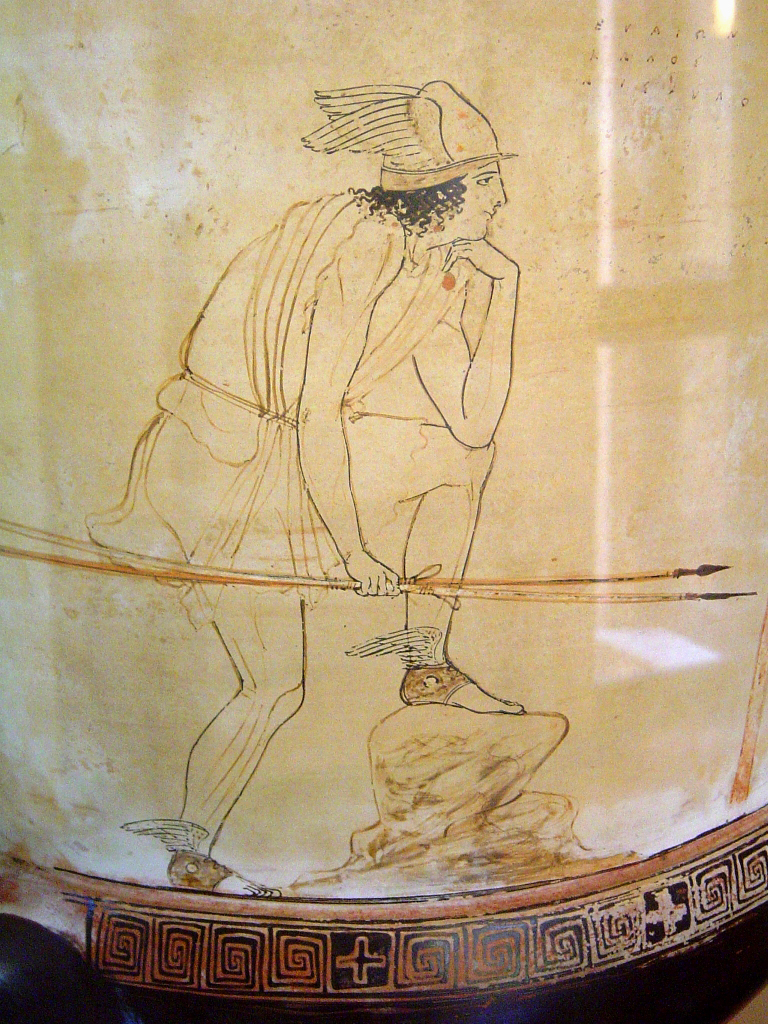
Portrait of the Greek actor Euiaon in Sophocles's Andromeda, c. 430 BC.

Sophocles is known for innovations in dramatic structure; deeper development of characters than earlier playwrights; and, if it was not due to Aeschylus, the addition of a third actor, which further reduced the role of the chorus, and increased opportunities for development and conflict. Aeschylus, who dominated Athenian playwriting during Sophocles's early career, adopted the third actor into his own work. Besides the third actor, Aristotle credits Sophocles with the introduction of skenographia, or scenery-painting; but this too is attributed elsewhere to someone else (by Vitruvius, to Agatharchus of Samos). After Aeschylus died, in 456 BC, Sophocles became the pre-eminent playwright in Athens, winning competitions at eighteen Dionysia, and six Lenaia festivals. His reputation was such that foreign rulers invited him to attend their courts; but, unlike Aeschylus, who died in Sicily, or Euripides, who spent time in Macedon, Sophocles never accepted any of these invitations. Aristotle, in his Poetics (c. 335 BC), used Sophocles's Oedipus Rex as an example of the highest achievement in tragedy.

Only two of the seven surviving plays can be dated securely: Philoctetes to 409 BC, and Oedipus at Colonus to 401 BC (staged after his death, by his grandson). Of the others, Electra shows stylistic similarities to these two, suggesting that it was probably written in the later part of his career; Ajax, Antigone, and The Trachiniae, are generally thought early, again based on stylistic elements; and Oedipus Rex is put in a middle period. Most of Sophocles's plays show an undercurrent of early fatalism, and the beginnings of Socratic logic as a mainstay for the long tradition of Greek tragedy.

=== Theban plays ===
The Theban plays comprise three plays: Oedipus Rex (also called Oedipus Tyrannus or Oedipus the King), Oedipus at Colonus, and Antigone. All three concern the fate of Thebes during and after the reign of King Oedipus. They have often been published under a single cover; but Sophocles wrote them for separate festival competitions, many years apart. The Theban plays are not a proper trilogy (i.e. three plays presented as a continuous narrative), nor an intentional series; they contain inconsistencies. Sophocles also wrote other plays pertaining to Thebes, such as the Epigoni, but only fragments have survived.

==== Subjects ====
The three plays involve the tale of Oedipus, who kills his father and marries his mother, not knowing they are his parents. His family is cursed for three generations.

In Oedipus Rex, Oedipus is the protagonist. Thebes is suffering from a plague, and Oedipus has sent Creon, the brother of his wife Jocasta, to seek advice from the Delphic Oracle. It is gradually revealed, partly through the testimony of the prophet Tiresias, that Oedipus himself is the reason for the plague. Unknown to himself, he is the son of Jocasta and the former king, Laius; having received a prophecy that their son would kill his father and marry his mother, the parents ordered a slave to kill him as a baby. However, the slave instead left the child on Mount Cithaeron, where he was found and adopted by a childless couple. As a young man, Oedipus had met and killed a man on the road to Thebes; unknown to either of them, this man was his father, Laius. Oedipus became the ruler of Thebes after solving the riddle of the Sphinx and in the process, marries the widowed queen, his mother Jocasta. When the truth comes out, following Creon's return from Delphi, Jocasta commits suicide, and Oedipus blinds himself. Creon becomes king, Oedipus goes into exile, and Creon forbids him to take his children with him.

In Oedipus at Colonus, the banished Oedipus and his daughter Antigone arrive at the town of Colonus, where they encounter Theseus, King of Athens. Creon demands that Oedipus return to Thebes, since an oracle has foretold that the city shall not know peace unless Oedipus is buried there. Theseus protects Oedipus, who refuses to return, and also refuses the exhortation of his son Polynices to help him overthrow Creon. At the end of the play, Oedipus dies peacefully.

In Antigone, the protagonist is Oedipus's daughter, Antigone. Her brother, Polyneices, has been killed shortly before the opening of the action, as part of the unsuccessful attack of the Seven against Thebes. Creon has forbidden his body to be buried, and Antigone is required to choose between leaving it outside the city walls, exposed to the ravages of wild animals, or to bury him and face death. Antigone decides to bury his body and face the consequences of her actions. Creon sentences her to death. Eventually, Creon is persuaded to free Antigone from her punishment, but his decision comes too late and Antigone commits suicide. Her suicide triggers the suicide of two others close to King Creon: his son, Haemon, who was to wed Antigone, and his wife, Eurydice, who commits suicide after losing her only surviving son.

==== Composition and inconsistencies ====
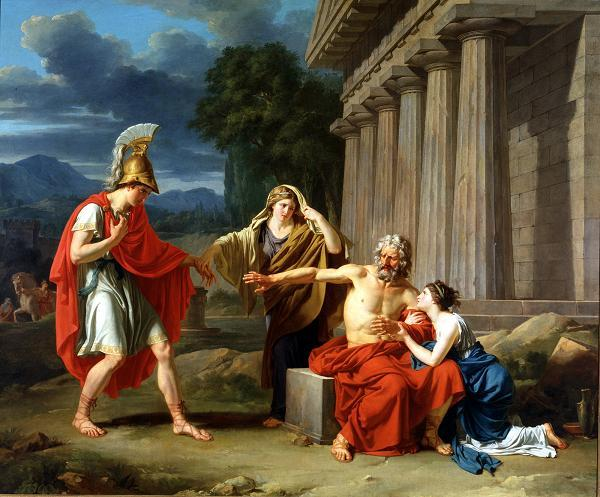
Oedipus at Colonus by Jean-Antoine-Théodore Giroust (1788), Dallas Museum of Art

The plays were written across 36 years of Sophocles's career and were not composed in chronological order, but instead were written in the order Antigone, Oedipus Rex, and Oedipus at Colonus. Nor were they composed as a trilogy – a group of plays to be performed together, but are the remaining parts of three different groups of plays. As a result, there are some inconsistencies: notably, Creon is the undisputed king at the end of Oedipus Rex and, in consultation with Apollo, single-handedly makes the decision to expel Oedipus from Thebes. Creon is also instructed to look after Oedipus's daughters Antigone and Ismene at the end of Oedipus Rex. By contrast, in the other plays there is some struggle with Oedipus's sons Eteocles and Polynices in regard to the succession. In Oedipus at Colonus, Sophocles attempts to work these inconsistencies into a coherent whole: Ismene explains that, in light of their tainted family lineage, her brothers were at first willing to cede the throne to Creon. Nevertheless, they eventually decided to take charge of the monarchy, with each brother disputing the other's right to succeed. In addition to being in a clearly more powerful position in Oedipus at Colonus, Eteocles and Polynices are also culpable: they consent (l. 429, Theodoridis, tr.) to their father's going to exile, which is one of his bitterest charges against them.

=== Other plays ===
In addition to the three Theban plays, there are four surviving plays by Sophocles: Ajax, Women of Trachis, Electra, and Philoctetes, the last of which won first prize in 409 BC.

Ajax focuses on the proud hero of the Trojan War, Telamonian Ajax, who is driven to treachery and eventually suicide. Ajax becomes gravely upset when Achilles's armor is presented to Odysseus instead of himself. Despite their enmity toward him, Odysseus persuades the kings Menelaus and Agamemnon to grant Ajax a proper burial.

The Women of Trachis (named for the Trachinian women who make up the chorus) dramatizes Deianeira's accidentally killing Heracles after he had completed his famous twelve labors. Tricked into thinking it is a love charm, Deianeira applies poison to an article of Heracles's clothing; this poisoned robe causes Heracles to die an excruciating death. Upon learning the truth, Deianeira kills herself.

Electra corresponds roughly to the plot of Aeschylus's Libation Bearers. It details how Electra and Orestes avenge their father Agamemnon's murder by Clytemnestra and Aegisthus.

Philoctetes retells the story of Philoctetes, an archer who had been abandoned on Lemnos by the rest of the Greek fleet while on the way to Troy. After learning that they cannot win the Trojan War without Philoctetes's bow, the Greeks send Odysseus and Neoptolemus to retrieve him; due to the Greeks' earlier treachery, however, Philoctetes refuses to rejoin the army. It is only Heracles's deus ex machina appearance that persuades Philoctetes to go to Troy.

=== Fragmentary plays ===
Aristophanes of Byzantium, a scholar of the Library of Alexandria who worked between the third and second centuries BC, wrote that 130 titles were attributed to Sophocles, of which either seven or seventeen were considered spurious. Although more than 120 titles of plays (some of which may have been alternative titles for the same work) associated with Sophocles are known, little is known of the precise dating of most of them. Philoctetes is known to have been written in 409 BC, and Oedipus at Colonus is known to have only been performed in 401 BC, posthumously, at the initiation of Sophocles's grandson. By the time of Sophocles, the convention on writing plays for the Greek festivals was to submit them in tetralogies of three tragedies along with one satyr play. Along with the unknown dating of the vast majority of more than 120 plays, it is also largely unknown how the plays were grouped, or if Sophocles consistently followed this convention. It is, however, known that the three plays referred to in the modern era as the "Theban plays" were never performed together in Sophocles's own lifetime, and are therefore not part of the same tetralogy.

Fragments of Ichneutae (Tracking Satyrs) were discovered in Egypt in 1907. These amount to about half of the play, making it the best preserved satyr play after Euripides's Cyclops, which survives in its entirety. Fragments of the Epigoni were discovered in April 2005 by classicists at Oxford University with the help of infrared technology previously used for satellite imaging. The tragedy tells the story of the second siege of Thebes. A number of other Sophoclean works have survived only in fragments, including:

- Aias Lokros (Ajax the Locrian)
- Aias Mastigophoros (Ajax the Whip-Bearer)
- Aigeus (Aegeus)
- Aigisthos (Aegisthus)
- Aikhmalôtides (The Captive Women)
- Aithiopes (The Ethiopians), or Memnon
- Akhaiôn Syllogos (The Gathering of the Achaeans)
- Akhilleôs Erastai ([male] Lovers of Achilles)
- Akrisios
- Aleadae (The Sons of Aleus)
- Aletes
- Alexandros (Alexander)
- Alcmeôn
- Amphiaraus
- Amphitryôn
- Amycos
- Andromache
- Andromeda
- Antenoridai (Sons of Antenor)
- Athamas (two versions produced)
- Atreus, or Mykenaiai
- Camicoi
- Cassandra
- Cedaliôn
- Cerberus
- Chryseis
- Clytemnestra
- Colchides
- Côphoi (Mute Ones)
- Creusa
- Crisis (Judgement)
- Daedalus
- Danae
- Dionysiacus
- Dolopes
- Epigoni (The Progeny)
- Eriphyle

- Eris
- Eumelus
- Euryalus
- Eurypylus
- Eurysaces
- Helenes Apaitesis (Helen's Demand)
- Helenes Gamos (Helen's Marriage)
- Herakles Epi Tainaro (Hercules At Taenarum)
- Hermione
- Hipponous
- Hybris
- Hydrophoroi (Water-Bearers)
- Inachos
- Iobates
- Iokles
- Iôn
- Iphigenia
- Ixiôn
- Lacaenae (Lacaenian Women)
- Laocoôn
- Larisaioi
- Lemniai (Lemnian Women)
- Manteis (The Prophets) or Polyidus
- Meleagros
- Minôs
- Momus
- Mousai (Muses)
- Mysoi (Mysians)
- Nauplios Katapleon (Nauplius' Arrival)
- Nauplios Pyrkaeus (Nauplius' Fires)
- Nausicaa, or Plyntriai
- Niobe
- Odysseus Acanthoplex (Odysseus Scourged with Thorns)
- Odysseus Mainomenos (Odysseus Gone Mad)
- Oeneus
- Oenomaus
- Palamedes

- Pandora, or Sphyrokopoi (Hammer-Strikers)
- Pelias
- Peleus
- Phaiakes
- Phaedra
- Philoctetes In Troy
- Phineus (two versions)
- Phoenix
- Phrixus
- Phryges (Phrygians)
- Phthiôtides
- Poimenes (The Shepherds)
- Polyxene
- Priam
- Procris
- Rhizotomoi (The Root-Cutters)
- Salmoneus
- Sinon
- Sisyphus
- Skyrioi (Scyrians)
- Skythai (Scythians)
- Syndeipnoi (The Diners, or, The Banqueters)
- Tantalus
- Telephus
- Tereus
- Teukros (Teucer)
- Thamyras
- Theseus
- Thyestes
- Troilus
- Triptolemos
- Tympanistai (Drummers)
- Tyndareos
- Tyro Keiromene (Tyro Shorn)
- Tyro Anagnorizomene (Tyro Rediscovered).
- Xoanephoroi (Image-Bearers)

=== Sophocles's view of his own work ===
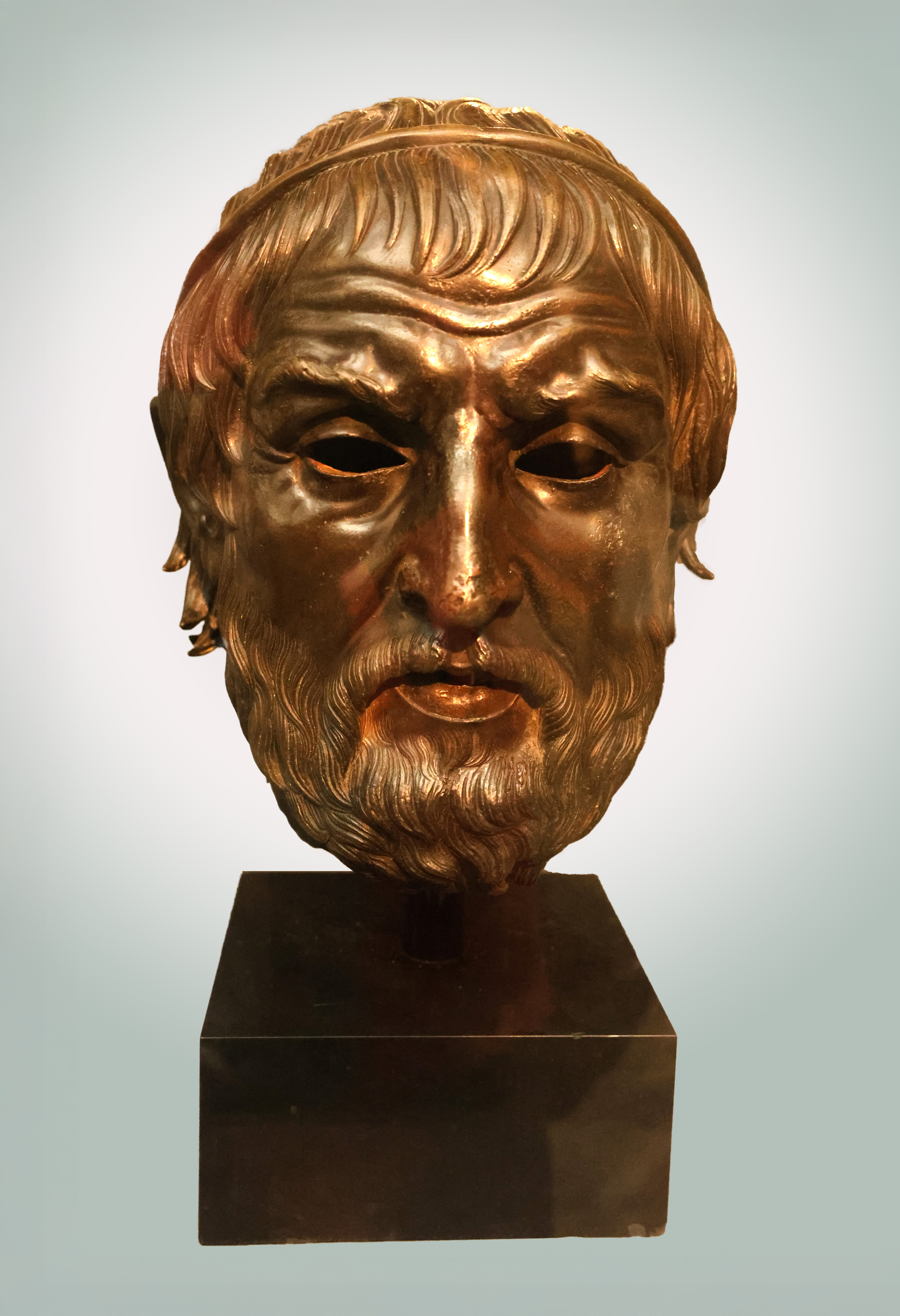
Bronze head at the British Museum.

There is a passage of Plutarch's tract De Profectibus in Virtute 7 in which Sophocles discusses his own growth as a writer. A likely source of this material for Plutarch was the Epidemiae of Ion of Chios, a book that recorded many conversations of Sophocles; a Hellenistic dialogue about tragedy, in which Sophocles appeared as a character, is also plausible. The former is a likely candidate to have contained Sophocles's discourse on his own development because Ion was a friend of Sophocles, and the book is known to have been used by Plutarch. Though some interpretations of Plutarch's words suggest that Sophocles says that he imitated Aeschylus, the translation does not fit grammatically, nor does the interpretation that Sophocles said that he was making fun of Aeschylus's works. C. M. Bowra argues for the following translation of the line: "After practising to the full the bigness of Aeschylus, then the painful ingenuity of my own invention, now in the third stage I am changing to the kind of diction which is most expressive of character and best."

Here Sophocles says that he has completed a stage of Aeschylus's work, meaning that he went through a phase of imitating Aeschylus's style but is finished with that. Sophocles's opinion of Aeschylus was mixed. He certainly respected him enough to imitate his work early on in his career, but he had reservations about Aeschylus's style, and thus did not keep his imitation up. Sophocles's first stage, in which he imitated Aeschylus, is marked by "Aeschylean pomp in the language". Sophocles's second stage was entirely his own. He introduced new ways of evoking feeling out of an audience, as in his Ajax, when Ajax is mocked by Athene, then the stage is emptied so that he may commit suicide alone. Sophocles mentions a third stage, distinct from the other two, in his discussion of his development. The third stage pays more heed to diction. His characters spoke in a way that was more natural to them and more expressive of their individual character feelings.

== Reception ==
Signs of an early reception of Sophocles' work can be found in a greater number of quotations or allusions in ancient Greek literature starting with some of his contemporaries.

== Locations named after ==
- Sophocles (crater), a crater on Mercury.

== See also ==
- Theatre of ancient Greece

== Sources ==
- Beer, Josh (2004). Sophocles and the Tragedy of Athenian Democracy. Greenwood Publishing. ISBN 0-313-28946-8
- Bowra, C. M. (1940). "Sophocles on His Own Development". American Journal of Philology. 61 (4): 385–401. doi:10.2307/291377. JSTOR 291377.
- Finkel, Raphael. "Adler number: sigma,815". Suda on Line: Byzantine Lexicography.
- Freeman, Charles. (1999). The Greek Achievement: The Foundation of the Western World. New York: Viking Press. ISBN 0-670-88515-0
- Hubbard, Thomas K. (2003). Homosexuality in Greece and Rome: A Sourcebook of Basic Documents.
- Johnson, Marguerite, & Terry Ryan (2005). Sexuality in Greek and Roman Society and Literature: A Sourcebook. Routledge. ISBN 0-415-17331-0, 978-0-415-17331-5
- Lloyd-Jones, Hugh, & Wilson, Nigel Guy (ed.) (1990). Sophoclis: Fabulae. Oxford Classical Texts.
- Lloyd-Jones, Hugh (ed.) (1994a). Sophocles: Ajax. Electra. Oedipus Tyrannus. Edited and translated by Hugh Lloyd-Jones, Loeb Classical Library No. 20.
- Lloyd-Jones, Hugh (ed.) (1994b). Sophocles: Antigone. The Women of Trachis. Philoctetes. Oedipus at Colonus. Edited and translated by Hugh Lloyd-Jones, Loeb Classical Library No. 21.
- Lloyd-Jones, Hugh (ed.) (1996). Sophocles: Fragments. Edited and translated by Hugh Lloyd-Jones, Loeb Classical Library No. 483.
- Lucas, Donald William (1964). The Greek Tragic Poets. W.W. Norton & Co.
- Plato. Plato in Twelve Volumes, Vols 5 & 6 translated by Paul Shorey. Cambridge, MA, Harvard University Press; London, William Heinemann Ltd. 1969.
- Schultz, Ferdinand (1835). De vita Sophoclis poetae commentatio. Phil. Diss., Berlin.
- Scullion, Scott (2002). "Tragic dates", Classical Quarterly, new sequence 52, pp. 81–101.
- Seaford, Richard A. S. (2003). "Satyric drama". In Simon Hornblower and Antony Spawforth (ed.). The Oxford Classical Dictionary (revised 3rd ed.). Oxford: Oxford University Press. p. 1361. ISBN 978-0-19-860641-3.
- Smith, Philip (1867). "Sophocles". In William Smith (ed.). Dictionary of Greek and Roman Biography and Mythology. Vol. 3. Boston: Little, Brown, and Company. pp. 865–73. Archived from the original on 2 February 2007.
- Sommerstein, Alan Herbert (2002). Greek Drama and Dramatists. Routledge. ISBN 0-415-26027-2
- Sommerstein, Alan Herbert (2007). "General Introduction", pp. xi–xxix in Sommerstein, A. H., Fitzpatrick, D.. and Tallboy, T. Sophocles: Selected Fragmentary Plays: Volume 1. Aris and Phillips. ISBN 0-85668-766-9
- Sophocles. Sophocles I: Oedipus the King, Oedipus at Colonus, Antigone. 2nd ed. Grene, David, and Lattimore, Richard, eds. Chicago: University of Chicago, 1991.
- Encyclopædia Britannica, Inc. "Macropaedia Knowledge In Depth". The New Encyclopædia Britannica Volume 20. Chicago: Encyclopædia Britannica, Inc., 2005. 344–46.
