= Agathon =

Athenian tragic poet (c.448–c.400 BC)

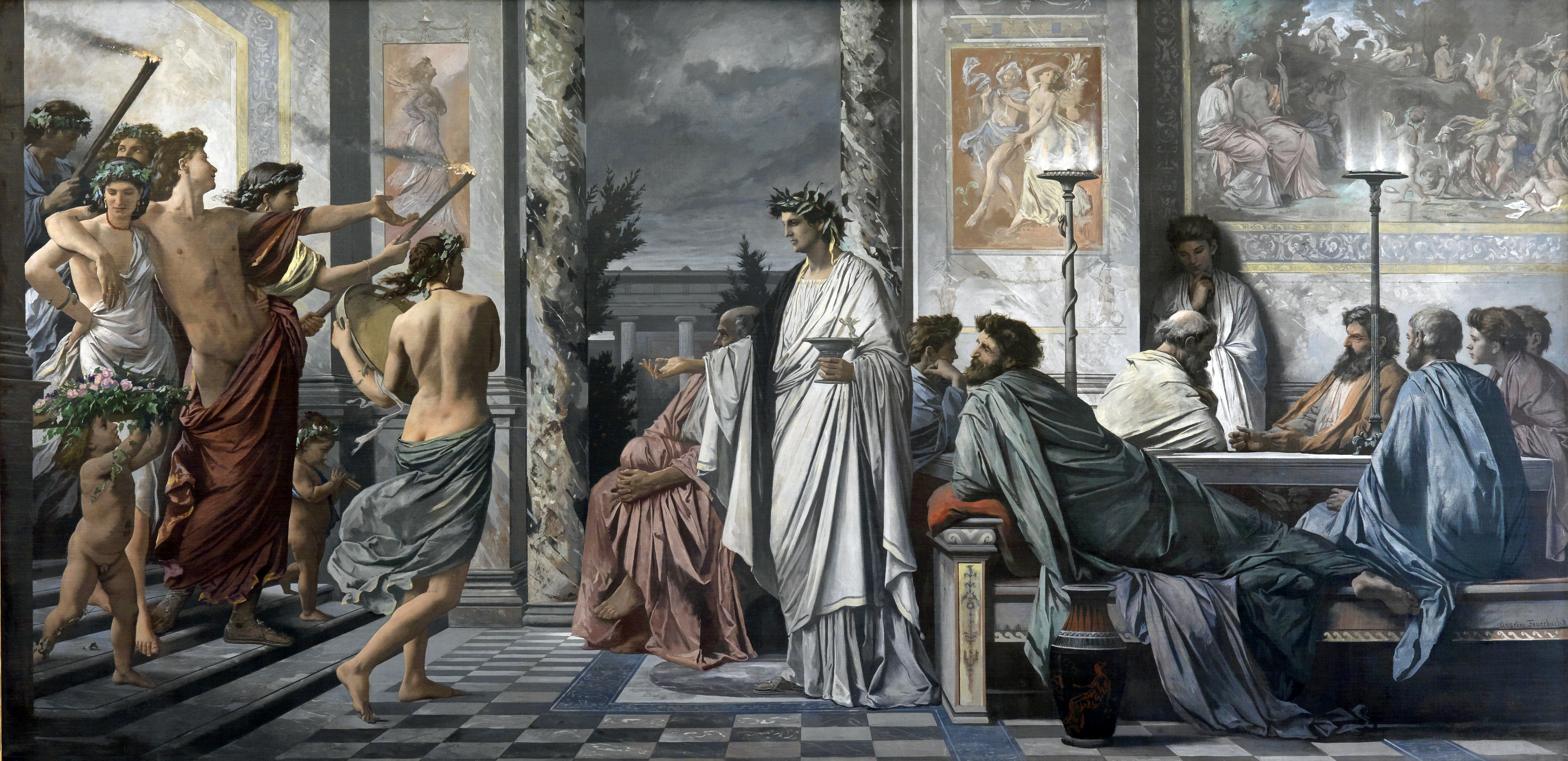
This painting by Anselm Feuerbach re-imagines a scene from Plato's Symposium, in which the tragedian Agathon welcomes the drunken Alcibiades into his home. 1869.

Agathon (/ˈæɡəθɒn/; Ancient Greek: Ἀγάθων; c. 448 – c. 400 BC) was an Athenian tragic poet whose works have been lost. He is best known for his appearance in Plato's Symposium, which describes the banquet given to celebrate his obtaining a prize for his first tragedy at the Lenaia in 416. He is also a prominent character in Aristophanes' comedy the Thesmophoriazusae.

== Life and career ==
Agathon was the son of Tisamenus, and the lover of Pausanias, with whom he appears in both the Symposium and Plato's Protagoras. Together with Pausanias, around 407 BC he moved to the court of Archelaus, king of Macedon, who was recruiting playwrights; it is here that he probably died around 401 BC. Agathon introduced certain innovations into the Greek theater: Aristotle tells us in the Poetics (1451^{b}21) that the characters and plot of his Anthos were original and not, following Athenian dramatic orthodoxy, borrowed from mythological or historical subjects. Agathon was also the first playwright to write choral parts which were apparently independent from the main plot of his plays.

Agathon is portrayed by Plato as a handsome young man, well dressed, of polished manners, courted by the fashion, wealth, and wisdom of Athens, and dispensing hospitality with ease and refinement. The epideictic speech in praise of love which Agathon recites in the Symposium is full of beautiful but artificial rhetorical expressions, and has led some scholars to believe he may have been a student of Gorgias. In the Symposium, Agathon is presented as the friend of the comic poet Aristophanes, but this alleged friendship did not prevent Aristophanes from harshly criticizing Agathon in at least two of his comic plays: the Thesmophoriazousae and the (now lost) Gerytades. In the later play Frogs, Aristophanes softens his criticisms, but even so, it may be only for the sake of punning on Agathon's name (ἁγαθός "good") that he makes Dionysus call him a "good poet".

Agathon was also a friend of Euripides, another recruit to the court of Archelaus of Macedon.

== Physical appearance ==
Agathon's extraordinary physical beauty is brought up repeatedly in the sources; the historian W. Rhys Roberts observes that "ὁ καλός Ἀγάθων (ho kalos Agathon) has become almost a stereotyped phrase." The most detailed surviving description of Agathon is in the Thesmophoriazousae, in which Agathon appears as a pale, clean-shaven young man dressed in women's clothes. Scholars are unsure how much of Aristophanes' portrayal is fact and how much mere comic invention.

After a close reading of the Thesmophoriazousae, the historian Jane McIntosh Snyder observed that Agathon's costume was almost identical to that of the famous lyric poet Anacreon, as he is portrayed in early 5th-century vase-paintings. Snyder theorizes that Agathon might have made a deliberate effort to mimic the sumptuous attire of his famous fellow poet, although by Agathon's time, such clothing, especially the κεκρύφαλος (kekryphalos, an elaborate covering for the hair) had long fallen out of fashion for men. According to this interpretation, Agathon is mocked in the Thesmophoriazousae not only for his effeminacy, but also for the pretentiousness of his dress: "he seems to think of himself, in all his elegant finery, as a rival to the old Ionian poets, perhaps even to Anacreon himself."

== Plato's epigram ==
Agathon is the subject of an epigram attributed to Plato:

τὴν ψυχὴν Ἀγάθωνα φιλῶν ἐπὶ χείλεσιν εἶχον· ἦλθε γὰρ ἡ τλήμων ὡς διαβησομένη.

One translation reads:

My soul was on my lips as I was kissing Agathon. Poor soul! she came hoping to cross over to him.

The epigram was probably not composed by Plato. Stylistic evidence suggests that the poem (with most of Plato's other alleged epigrams) was actually written sometime after Plato had died: its form is that of the Hellenistic erotic epigram, which did not become popular until after 300 BC. According to 20th-century scholar Walther Ludwig, the poems were spuriously inserted into an early biography of Plato sometime between 250 BC and 100 BC and adopted by later writers from this source. It is unlikely Plato would write a love epigram about Agathon, who was approximately twenty years older than he.

== Known plays ==
Of Agathon's plays, only six titles and thirty-one fragments have survived:

- Aerope
- Alcmeon
- Anthos or Antheus ("The Flower")
- Mysoi ("Mysians")
- Telephos ("Telephus")
- Thyestes

Fragments in A Nauck, Tragicorum graecorum fragmenta (1887). Fragments in Greek with English translations in Matthew Wright's "The Lost Plays of Greek Tragedy (Volume 1) Neglected Authors" (2016)

== Quotations ==
μόνου γὰρ αὐτοῦ καὶ θεὸς στερίσκεται,
ἀγένητα ποιεῖν ἅσσ᾽ ἂν ᾖ πεπραγμένα.
(This only is denied even to God,
The power to make what has been done undone.)

— Quoted in Aristotle's Nicomachean Ethics, 6.2, 1139b1

Look not round at the depraved morals of others, but run straight along the line without deviating from it.

— Marcus Aurelius, Meditations, IV.18

== See also ==
- List of speakers in Plato's dialogues
- Symposium (Feuerbach)
