= H. J. Rose =

British classical scholar (1883–1961)

- Rose in 1953
- Born: Herbert Jennings Rose; 5 May 1883; Orillia, Ontario, Canada
- Died: 31 July 1961 (aged 78); St Andrews, Scotland
- Education: McGill University; Balliol College, Oxford
- Occupation: Classical scholar

Herbert Jennings Rose FBA (5 May 1883, in Orillia – 31 July 1961, in St Andrews) was a Canadian-born British classical scholar, best remembered as the author of A Handbook of Greek Mythology, originally published in 1928, which became for many years the standard student reference book on the subject, reaching a sixth edition by 1958. Rose's Handbook was brought up-to-date along the same framework by Robin Hard, in The Routledge Handbook of Greek Mythology (Routledge 2004), a project that began as a mere revision.

== Early life ==
Rose was born in Orillia, Ontario, Canada, to a family of Scottish descent. He attended McGill University, where he was awarded a Rhodes scholarship, with which he went on to Balliol College, Oxford. He was said to be the first Oxford undergraduate to wear a soft hat on Sundays. He drew a chess game on Board 1 with the famous J R Capablanca in a cable match between American and English universities on 23 March 1907.

For four years he was a fellow and tutor of Exeter College. In 1911 he married Eliza Plimsoll, elder daughter of Samuel Plimsoll, the British social reformer who advocated improved safety standards at sea.

From 1919 to 1927, Rose was Professor of Latin at the University of Wales, Aberystwyth, and from 1927 to 1953 he was Professor of Greek at the University of St Andrews. Also during this time in 1934 he became a fellow of the British Academy.

== Work ==
Rose is best remembered as the author of A Handbook of Greek Mythology, which was published in 1928. This was his most successful work and is still widely used as a student reference book.

Upon his death it was written in the Glasgow Herald:

"The Scottish Universities have lost one of their most learned personalities by the death of Emeritus Professor H. J. Rose . . . as a lecturer he was much liked by both learned and popular audiences, while as teacher and colleague he was greatly beloved by generations of pupils and colleagues".

== Works ==
- Modern Methods in Classical Mythology (St. Andrews, 1930)
- A Handbook of Greek Literature from Homer to Lucian (1934)
- Hygini Fabulae (1934)
- A Handbook of Latin Literature (1954)
- Primitive Culture in Greece (London, 1925)
- Primitive Culture in Italy (London, 1926; reprint 1971)
- A Handbook of Greek Mythology (1929; sixth reprint 1958)
- Ancient Greek Religion (London, 1948)
- Ancient Roman Religion (London, 1949)
- Gods and Heroes of the Greeks (London, 1957; many reprints)
- A Commentary on the Surviving Plays of Aeschylus, 1957–8
- Outline of Classical Literature for Students of English (London, 1959; reprint 1961)
- Mythology and Pseudo-mythology (1935, doi:10.1080/0015587X.1935.9718582), an influential paper, printed as a Presidential Address

== Sources ==
- Accorinti, Domenico, "Herbert Jennings Rose (1883–1961) The Scholar and His Correspondents", in Illinois Classical Studies, No. 33–34, pp. 65–107, 2008–2009. JSTOR 10.5406/illiclasstud.33-34.0065.
