= List of lost literary works =

This is a list of lost literary works.

== Antiquity (to 500 CE) ==
=== Sumerian texts ===
- Enheduanna (24th–23rd century BC)
  - Hymn of Praise of Enheduanna, only survives in fragments.

=== Ancient Greek texts ===
- Homer (8th or 7th century BC)
  - Margites
  - The Odyssey mentions the blind singer Demodocus performing a poem recounting the otherwise unknown "Quarrel of Odysseus and Achilles", which might have been an actual work that did not survive.
- The Hesiodic Catalogue of Women (sometime between 750 and 650 BC)
- The work of the Cyclic poets (excluding Homer, dated between the 8th century and 5th century BC), specifically:
  - six epics of the Epic Cycle: Cypria, Aethiopis, the Little Iliad, the Iliupersis ("Sack of Troy"), Nostoi ("Returns"), and Telegony.
  - four epics of the Theban Cycle: Oedipodea, Thebaid, Epigoni, and Alcmeonis.
  - other early Greek epics: Titanomachy, Heracleia, Capture of Oechalia, Naupactia, Phocais, Minyas
- Alcman (7th century BC)
  - Of six books of choral lyrics that were known (ca. 50–60 hymns), only fragmentary quotations in other Greek authors were known until the discovery of a fragment in 1855, containing approximately 100 verses. In the 1960s, many more fragments were discovered and published from a dig at Oxyrhynchus.
- Thespis (c. 6th century BC) (possibly erroneous attributions or forgeries made during the Common Era)
  - Contest of Pelias and Phorbas
  - Hiereis (or Priests)
  - Hemitheoi (or Demigods)
  - Pentheus
- Thales (c. 624/623 – c. 548/545 BC)
  - On the Solstice (possible lost work)
  - On the Equinox (possible lost work)
- Anaximander (c. 610 – c. 546 BC)
  - On Nature (or Perì Phúseôs)
  - Rotation of the Earth (or Gês Períodos)
  - On Fixed Stars (or Perì Tôn Aplanôn)
  - The Celestial Sphere (or Sphaîra))
- The Hellespontine Sibyl (c. 6th century BC)
  - Sibylline Books
- Pherecydes of Syros (6th century BCE)
  - Heptamychia
- Anacreon (6th century BC)
  - Of the five books of lyrical pieces mentioned in the Suda and by Athenaeus, only mere fragments collected from the citations of later writers now exist.
- Xenophanes (c. 570-c. 478 BC)
  - Fragments of his poetry survive only as quotations by later Greek writers.
- Epicharmus of Cos (c. 550-c. 460 BC)
  - He wrote between 35 and 52 comedies, many of which have been lost or exist only in fragments.
- Aeschylus (525–455 BC). He is believed to have written some 90 plays, of which six survive. A seventh play is attributed to him.
  - Achilleis, fragments of this play were said to have been discovered in the wrappings of a mummy in the 1990s.
  - Alcmene
  - The Argo
  - Atalanta
  - The Bacchae
  - Cabiri
  - Callisto
  - The Children of Heracles
  - Circe
  - The Danaids
  - The Egyptians
  - Epigoni
  - Iphigenia
  - Ixion
  - The Lion
  - Memnon
  - Myrmidons, survives in fragments.
  - Nereids, survives in fragments.
  - Niobe
  - The Nurses of Dionysus
  - Penelope
  - Pentheus
  - Philoctetes
  - Phrygians (or Hector’s Ransom), survives in fragments.
  - The Priestesses
  - Prometheus The Fire-Bearer
  - Prometheus The Fire-Kindler
  - Prometheus Unbound
  - Semele
  - Sisyphus The Runaway
  - Sisyphus The Stone-Roller
  - The Sphinx
  - Telephus
  - The Thracian Women
  - The Weighing of Souls
  - Women of Salamis
  - The Youths
- Cratinus (c. 519 BC – c. 422 BC)
  - Only fragments of his works have been preserved.
- Ctesias (5th century BC)
  - Persica, a history of Assyria and Persia in 23 books
  - Indica, an account of India
- Agathon (5th century BC)
  - None of his plays survive.
- Eupolis (5th century BC)
  - Of the 17 plays attributed to him, only fragments remain.
- Anaxagoras (c. 500 – 428 BC)
  - Book of Philosophy. Only fragments of the first part have survived.
- Xenocles (c. 5th century BC)
  - Athamas
  - Bacchae
  - Licymnius
  - Lycaon
  - Myes
  - Oedipus
- Anaximander (late 6th-early 5th century BCE)
  - There are a few extant fragments of his works.
- Alcaeus (late 6th-early 5th century BCE)
  - Of a reported ten scrolls, there exist only quotes and numerous fragments of his work.
- Leucippus (f. 5th century BC)
  - None of his work survives, save for one singular sentence.
- Heraclitus (fl. c. 500 BC)
  - His writings only survive in fragments quoted by other authors.
- Sophocles (c. 497 – 406 BC)
  - Akhilleôs Erastai (or Male Lover of Achilles).
  - Aigeus
  - Aithiopes
  - Akrisios
  - Alexandros
  - Amphiaurus
  - Amycos Satyrykos
  - Antenoridae
  - Cassandra
  - Cerberus
  - Clytemnestra
  - Daedalus
  - Danae
  - Dionysiaca
  - Epigoni, only small fragments survive.
  - Eris
  - Helenes Apaitesis (or Helen’s Demand).
  - Helenes Gamos (or Helen’s Marriage).
  - Herakles Epi Tainaro (or Heracles At Taenarum).
  - Ichneutae, only a fragmentary 400 lines survive making it the second best surviving Satyr play behind Euripides's Cyclops.
  - Inachos, only small fragments survive.
  - Ion
  - Iphigenia
  - Ixion
  - Minos
  - Niobe
  - Odysseus Acanthoplex, only fragments survive.
  - Odysseus Mainomenos (or Odysseus Gone Mad)
  - Pandora
  - Peleus
  - Phaedra
  - Philoctetes In Troy
  - Phoenix
  - Priam
  - Sisyphus
  - Tantalus
  - Tereus, only fragmentary knowledge survives.
  - Theseus
  - Triptolemos, only small fragments survive.
  - Women of Colchis
- Ion of Chios (c. 490 BC – c. 420 BC)
  - Agamemnon
  - Alcmene
  - Argives
  - Eurytidai (or Sons of Erytus)
  - Laertes
  - Omphale
  - Phoenix and Caeneus
  - Phoenix Deuteros
  - Phrouroi (or Sentinels)
  - Teucer
- Protagoras (c. 490 BC – c. 420 BC)
  - "On the Gods" (essay)
  - On the Art of Disputation
  - On the Original State of Things
  - On Truth
- Gorgias (483–375 BC)
  - On Non-Existence (or On Nature). Only two sketches of it exist.
  - Epitaphios. What exists is thought to be only a small fragment of a significantly longer piece.
- Pherecydes of Leros (c. 480 BC)
  - A history of Leros
  - On Iphigeneia, an essay
  - On the Festivals of Dionysus
- Euripides (c. 480 – c. 406 BC). He is believed to have written over 90 plays, 18 of which have survived. Fragments, some substantial, of most other plays also survive.
  - Alcmaeon in Corinth (405 BC), only fragments survive.
  - Alcmaeon in Psophis (438 BC), only fragments survive.
  - Alexandros (415 BC)
  - Andromeda (412 BC), only fragments survive.
  - Antiope (410 BC)
  - Archelaus (410 BC), only fragments survive.
  - Bellerophon (430 BC), only fragments survive.
  - Captive Melanippe (412 BC)
  - Cresphontes (425 BC)
  - Cretan Women (438 BC)
  - Cretans (435 BC)
  - Dictys (431 BC), only fragments survive.
  - Erectheus (422 BC)
  - Hypsipyle (410 BC), only fragments survive.
  - Palamedes (415 BC)
  - Peliades (455 BC)
  - Phaethon (420 BC), only fragments survive.
  - Philoctetes (431 BC), only fragments survive.
  - Sisyphus (415 BC)
  - Stheneboea (429 BC)
  - Telephus (438 BC)
  - Theristai (or Reapers) (431 BC)
  - Wise Melanippe (420 BC)
- Aristophanes (c. 446 - c. 386 BC)
  - He wrote 40 plays, 11 of which survive.
- Socrates (c. 470–399 BC)
  - Verse versions of Aesop's Fables.
- Pherecydes of Athens (c. 465 BC)
  - Genealogies of the gods and heroes, originally in ten books; numerous fragments have been preserved.
- Prodicus (c. 465 BC – c. 395 BC)
  - On Nature
  - On the Nature of Man
  - "On Propriety of Language"
  - On the Choice of Heracles
- Agathon (c. 448 – c. 400 BC)
  - Aerope
  - Alcmaeon
  - Anthos (or The Flower)
  - Mysoi (or Mysians)
  - Telephos (or Telephus)
  - Thyestes
- Aristophanes (c. 446 BC – c. 386 BC)
  - Banqueters (427 BC)
  - Babylonians (426 BC)
  - The Clouds (first version 423 BC)
  - Amphiaraus (414 BC)
  - Plutus (first version 408 BC)
  - Cocalus (387 BC)
  - Aiolosicon (387 BC)
- Speusippus (c. 408 – 339/8 BC)
  - On Pythagorean Numbers
- Aristoxenus (4th century BC)
  - He is said to have written 453 works, dealing with philosophy, ethics and music. His only extant work is Elements of Harmony.
- Aristotle (384–322 BC). It is believed that about one third of his original works has survived.
  - second book of Poetics, dealing with comedy
  - On the Pythagoreans
  - Protrepticus (fragments survived)
- Eudemus (c. 370 BCE – c. 300 BCE)
  - History of Arithmetics, on the early history of Greek mathematics (only one short quote survives)
  - History of Astronomy, on the early history of Greek astronomy (several quotes survive)
  - History of Geometry, on the early history of Greek geometry (several quotes survive)
- Ptolemy I Soter (c. 364 – 282 BC)
  - History of Alexander
- Diphilus (c. 4th-3rd century BC)
  - He is said to have written 100 comedies, the titles of 50 of which are preserved.
- Ptolemy VIII Euergetes II (c. 184 – 116 BC)
  - Hypomnemata (The Memoirs or 'Notes'), twenty-four books of a miscellaneous collection of paradoxography
- Callisthenes (c. 360 – 327 BCE)
  - An account of Alexander's expedition
  - A history of Greece from the Peace of Antalcidas (387) to the Third Sacred War (357)
  - A history of the Phocian war
- Cleitarchus (mid to late 4th century BCE)
  - History of Alexander
- Pytheas of Massalia (c. 350 BC, fl. c. 320–306 BC)
  - τὰ περὶ τοῦ Ὠκεανοῦ (ta peri tou Okeanou) "On the Ocean"
- Aristarchus of Samos (c. 310 – c. 230 BCE)
  - Astronomy book outlining his heliocentrism (astronomical model in which the Earth and planets revolve around a relatively stationary Sun)
- Megasthenes (c. 290 BC)
  - Indica, an account of Mauryan India
- Manetho (early third century BC)
  - Ægyptiaca (History of Egypt) in three books. Few, indirect, fragments survive.
- Berossus (beginning of the 3rd century BC)
  - Babyloniaca (History of Babylonia)
- Euclid (fl. 300 BC)
  - Conics, a work on conic sections later extended by Apollonius of Perga into his famous work on the subject.
  - Porisms, the exact meaning of the title is controversial (probably "corollaries").
  - Pseudaria, or Book of Fallacies, an elementary text about fallacies in reasoning.
  - Surface Loci concerned either loci (sets of points) on surfaces or loci which were themselves surfaces.
- Callimachus (3rd century BC)
  - Of about 800 works, in verse and prose; only six hymns, 64 epigrams and some fragments survive; a considerable fragment of the epic Hecale, was discovered in the Rainer papyri.
- Archimedes (c. 287 – c. 212 BC)
  - On Sphere-Making
  - On Polyhedra
- Ctesibius (285–222 BC)
  - On pneumatics, a work describing force pumps
  - Memorabilia, a compilation of his research works
- Chrysippus (c. 279-c.206 BC)
  - Of over 700 written works, none survive, except a few fragments embedded in the works of later authors.
- Eratosthenes (c. 276 BC – c. 195/194 BC)
  - Περὶ τῆς ἀναμετρήσεως τῆς γῆς (On the Measurement of the Earth; lost, summarized by Cleomedes)
  - Geographica (lost, criticized by Strabo)
  - Arsinoe (a memoir of queen Arsinoe; lost; quoted by Athenaeus in the Deipnosophistae)
- Nicagoras, Athenian sophist (2nd century BC)
  - Lives of Famous People
  - On Cleopatra in Troas
  - Embassy Speech to Philip the Roman Emperor
- Minucianus, son of Nicagoras the Athenian sophist (2nd century BC)
  - Art of Rhetoric
  - Progymnasmata
- Nicander (2nd century BC)
  - Aetolica, a prose history of Aetolia.
  - Heteroeumena, a mythological epic.
  - Georgica and Melissourgica, of which considerable fragments are preserved.
- Clitomachus (2nd century BC)
  - According to Diogenes Laërtius, he wrote some 400 books, of which none are extant today, although a few titles are known.
- Agatharchides (2nd century BC)
  - Ta kata ten Asian (Affairs in Asia) in 10 books
  - Ta kata ten Europen (Affairs in Europe) in 49 books
  - Peri ten Erythras thalasses (On the Erythraean Sea) in 5 books
- Apollodorus of Athens (c. 180 BC – after 120 BC)
  - Chronicle (Χρονικά), a Greek history in verse
  - On the Gods (Περὶ θεῶν), known through quotes to have included etymologies of the names and epithets of the gods
  - A twelve-book essay about Homer's Catalogue of Ships
- Diodorus Siculus (1st century BC)
  - Bibliotheca historia (Historical Library). Of 40 books, only books 1–5 and 10–20 are extant.
- Alexander Polyhistor (first half of 1st century BC)
  - Successions of Philosophers
- Memnon of Heraclea (c. 1st century AD)
  - History of Heraclea Pontica
- Pamphilus of Alexandria (1st century AD)
  - Comprehensive lexicon in 95 books of foreign or obscure words.
- Marcion of Sinope (late 1st-early 2nd century AD)
  - The Gospel of the Lord, a work compiled by Marcion to support his interpretation of Christianity. Marcion's writings were suppressed but a portion of them have been recreated from the works that were used to denounce them.
- Papias (late 1st-2nd century AD)
  - Exposition of the Oracles of the Lord in five books, mentioned by Eusebius of Caesarea.
- Hegesippus (2nd century AD)
  - Hypomnemata (Memoirs) in five books, and a history of the Christian church.
- Zoticus (3rd century AD)
  - Story of Atlantis, a poem mentioned by Porphyry
- Praxagoras of Athens (4th century AD)
  - History of Constantine the Great, known from a précis by Photius.
- Eusebius of Caesarea (4th century AD)
  - Praeparatio Ecclesiastica.
  - Demonstratio Ecclesiastica.
- Sozomen (5th century AD)
  - A history of the Christian church, from the Ascension of Jesus to the defeat of Licinius in 323, in twelve books.

==== Unnamed texts ====
- Lost works of Apuleius in many genres, including a novel, Hermagoras, as well as poetry, dialogues, hymns, and technical treatises on politics, dendrology, agriculture, medicine, natural history, astronomy, music, and arithmetic.
- Lost plays of Aristarchus of Tegea. Of 70 pieces, only the titles of three of his plays, with a single line of the text, have survived.
- Lost works of the historian Arrian.
- Lost works of Cleopatra including books on medicine, magical charms, and cosmetics (according to the historian Al-Masudi).
- Lost works of Democritus. He wrote extensively on natural philosophy and ethics, of which little remains.
- Lost works of Diogenes of Sinope. He is reported to have written several books, none of which has survived to the present date. Whether or not these books were actually his writings or attributions are in dispute.
- Lost works of Enoch. According to the Second Book of Enoch, the prophet wrote 360 manuscripts.
- Lost works of Empedocles. Little of what he wrote survives today.
- Lost works of Hippasus. Few of his original works now survive.
- Lost works of Hippias. He is credited with an excellent work on Homer, collections of Greek and foreign literature, and archaeological treatises, but nothing remains except the barest notes.
- Lost orations of Hyperides. Some 79 speeches were transmitted in his name in antiquity. A codex of his speeches was seen at Buda in 1525 in the library of King Matthias Corvinus of Hungary, but was destroyed by the Turks in 1526. In 2002, Natalie Tchernetska of Trinity College, Cambridge discovered and identified fragments of two speeches of Hyperides that have been considered lost, Against Timandros and Against Diondas. Six other orations survive in whole or part.
- Lost poems of Ibycus. According to the Suda, he wrote seven books of lyrics.
- Lost plays of Ion of Chios. Variously stated to have written 12 to 40 tragedies during his lifetime with only the titles and fragments of 11 of these plays survive.
- Lost works of Melissus of Samos. Only fragments preserved in other writers' works exist.
- Lost plays of Menander. He wrote over a hundred comedies of which one survives. Fragments of a number of his plays survive.
- Lost poems of Phanocles. He wrote some poems about homosexual relationships among heroes of the mythical tradition of which only one survives, along with a few short fragments.
- Lost works of Philemon. Of his 97 works, 57 are known to us only as titles and fragments.
- Lost poetry of Pindar. Of his varied books of poetry, only his victory odes survive in complete form. The rest are known only by quotations in other works or papyrus scraps unearthed in Egypt.
- There exists a list of more than 60 lost works in many genres by the philosopher Porphyry, including Against the Christians (of which only fragments survive).
- Lost works of Posidonius. All of his works are now lost. Some fragments exist, as well as titles and subjects of many of his books.
- Lost works of Proclus. A number of his commentaries on Plato are lost.
- Lost works of Pyrrhus. He wrote Memoirs and several books on the art of war, all now lost. According to Plutarch, Hannibal was influenced by them and they received praise from Cicero.
- Lost works of Pythagoras. No texts by him survived.
- Lost works of Pythangelus. Cited as a tragic poet in Aristophanes play The Frogs though little is known about his existence and none of his work survives.
- Lost plays of Rhinthon. Of 38 plays, only a few titles and lines have been preserved.
- Lost poems of Sappho. Only a few full poems and fragments of others survive. It has been hypothesized that poems 61 and 62 of Catullus were inspired by lost works of Sappho.
- Lost poems of Simonides of Ceos. Of his poetry we possess two or three short elegies, several epigrams and about 90 fragments of lyric poetry.
- Lost plays of Sophocles. Of 123 plays, seven survive, with fragments of others.
- Lost poems of Stesichorus. Of several long works, significant fragments survive.
- Lost works of Theodectes. Of his 50 tragedies, we have the names of about 13 and a few unimportant fragments. His treatise on the art of rhetoric and his speeches are lost.
- Lost works of Theophrastus: “On the Happy Life.” Of his 227 books, only a handful survive, including On Plants and On Stones, but On Mining is lost. Fragments and analyses of others survive.
- Lost works of Timon. None of his works survive except where he is quoted by others, mainly Sextus Empiricus.
- Lost plays of Xenocles. Referenced various times in the works of Aristophanes as an inferior poet and had won first place in the Dionysia in 415 BC though none of his works survive.
- Lost works of Zeno of Elea. None of his works survive intact.
- Lost works of Zeno of Citium. None of his writings have survived except as fragmentary quotations preserved by later writers.

=== Ancient Roman texts ===
- Livius Andronicus (284–204 BC)
  - Achilles
  - Aegisthus
  - Aiax Mastigophorus (Ajax with the Whip)
  - Andromeda
  - Danae
  - Equus Troianus (The Trojan Horse)
  - Gladiolus, only a fragment survives.
  - Hermiona
  - Ludius
  - Odyssia, a Latin translation of Homer's Odyssey, only fragments survive.
  - Tereus
  - Virgo
- Gnaeus Naevius (c. 270 – c. 201 BC)

- Acontizomenos (a comedy)
- Aegisthus ("Aegisthus," a tragedy)
- Aesiona (a tragedy)
- Agitatoria (a comedy)
- Agrypnuntes ("Sleepless People," a comedy)
- Appella (a comedy)
- Astiologa (a comedy)
- Clastidium ("The Fortress," a fabula praetexta)
- Colax ("The Flatterer," a comedy)
- Corollaria ("The Garlands," a comedy)
- Danae ("Danae," a tragedy)
- Dementes ("Crazy People," a comedy)
- Dolus ("The Trick," a comedy)
- Equus Troianus ("The Trojan Horse," a tragedy)
- Figulus ("The Potter," a comedy)
- Glaucoma ("The Cataract," a comedy)
- Hariolus ("The Fortune-Teller," comedy)
- Hector Proficiscens ("Hector Setting Forth," tragedy)
- Leo ("The Lion," a comedy)
- Lycurgus ("Lycurgus," a tragedy)
- Nautae ("Sailors", a comedy)
- Paelex ("The Concubine," or "Mistress", comedy)
- Personata ("Lady Wearing a Mask," comedy)
- Projectus (a comedy)
- Quadrigemini ("The Quadruplets," a comedy)
- Romulus, or Alimonium Romuli et Remi ("The Nourishing of Romulus and Remus", a fabula praetexta)
- Stalagmus (a comedy)
- Stigmatias ("The Tattooed Man," a comedy)
- Tarentilla (a comedy)
- Triphallus ("The Man With Three Penises," a comedy)

- Plautus (c. 254 – 184 BC)
  - Acharistio
  - Addictus
  - Ambroicus, or Agroicus
  - Anus
  - Artamo
  - Astraba
  - Baccharia
  - Bis Compressa ("The Twice-Raped Woman")
  - Boeotia ("Boeotia")
  - Caecus ("The Blind Man"), or Praedones ("Plunderers")
  - Calceolus ("The Little Shoe")
  - Carbonaria ("The Charcoal-Burner")
  - Clitellaria, or Astraba
  - Colax ("The Flatterer")
  - Commorientes ("Those Dying Together")
  - Condalium ("The Slave Ring")
  - Cornicularia
  - Dyscolus ("The Grouch")
  - Foeneratrix ("The Lady Moneylender")
  - Fretum ("The Strait", or "Channel")
  - Frivolaria ("Trifles")
  - Fugitivi ("The Runaways"—possibly by Turpilius)
  - Gastrion, or Gastron
  - Hortulus ("Little Garden")
  - Kakistus (possibly by Accius)
  - Lenones Gemini ("The Twin Pimps")
  - Nervolaria
  - Parasitus Medicus ("The Parasite Physician")
  - Parasitus Piger ("The Lazy Parasite"), or Lipargus
  - Phagon ("The Glutton")
  - Plociona
  - Saturio
  - Scytha Liturgus ("The Scythian Public Servant")
  - Sitellitergus ("The Toilet Cleaner")
  - Trigemini ("Triplets")
  - Vidularia ("The Travelling Case")
- Ennius (c. 239-c. 169 BC)
  - Achilles or Achilles Aristarchi
  - Aiax
  - Alcmeo
  - Alexander
  - Ambracia
  - Andromacha
  - Andromeda
  - Athamas
  - Caupuncula or Copuncula or Cupuncula
  - Epicharmus
  - Erectheus
  - Euhemerus
  - Hectoris lytra
  - Hecuba
  - Hedyphagetica
  - Iphigenia
  - Melanippa
  - Nemea
  - Pancratiastes
  - Phoenix
  - Praecepta
  - Protrepticus
  - Sabinae
  - Scipio
  - Sota
  - Telamo
  - Telephus
  - Thyestes
- Cato the Elder (234–149 BC)
  - Origines, a 7-book history of Rome and the Italian states.
  - Carmen de moribus, a book of prayers or incantations for the dead in verse.
  - Praecepta ad Filium, a collection of maxims.
  - A collection of his speeches.
- Marcus Atilius (2nd century BC)
  - The Woman Hater
- Luscius Lanuvinus (2nd century BC)
  - Phasma
  - Thesaurus
- Pompilius
  - Unidentified play, of which one single fragment survives.
- Lucius Accius (c. 176-c. 86 BC)
  - Achilles
  - Aegisthus
  - Aeneade or Decius ("Sons of Aeneas" or "Decius")
  - Alcestis
  - Alcmeo ("Alcmaeon")
  - Alphesiboea
  - Amphitryo ("Amphitryon")
  - Andromeda
  - Annales ("Annals")
  - Antenoridae ("Antenor's Sons")
  - Antigona ("Antigone")
  - Armorum Iudicium ("Award of the Arms")
  - Astynanax
  - Athamas
  - Atreus
  - Bacchae ("The Bacchanals")
  - Brutus
  - Chrysippus
  - Clytaemnestra
  - Didascalia or Didascalion Libri ("Records of the Stage" or "Books of Stage Records")
  - Diomedes
  - Epigoni ("The After-Born")
  - Epinausmache ("The Battle at the Ships")
  - Erigona
  - Eriphyla ("Eriphyle")
  - Eurysaces
  - Hecuba
  - Hellenes ("The Greeks")
  - Io
  - Medea or Argonautae ("Medea" or "The Argonauts")
  - Melanippus
  - Meleager
  - Minos or Minotaurus ("Minos" or "The Minotaur")
  - Myrmidones ("Myrmidons")
  - Neoptolemus
  - Nyctegresia ("The Night-Alarm")
  - Oenomaus
  - Parerga
  - Pelopidae ("Pelops' Sons")
  - Persidae ("Perseus' Sons")
  - Philocteta or Philocteta Lemnius ("Philoctetes" or "Philoctetes on Lemnos")
  - Phinidae ("The Sons of Phineus")
  - Phoenissae ("The Phoenician Maidens")
  - Pragmatica ("Principles for Playwrights")
  - Praxidicus or Praxidica ("The Practical Adviser" or "Practical Hints")
  - Stasiastae or Tropaeum Liberi ("The Rebels" or "Liber's Trophy")
  - Tereus
  - Thebais ("A Tale of Thebes")
  - Troades ("Women of Troy")
- Sempronius Asellio (fl. c. 158-c. 91 BCE)
  - Rerum Gestarum Libri
- Sulla (138–78 BC)
  - Memoirs, referenced by Plutarch
- Gaius Julius Caesar Strabo (c.131-87 BC)
  - Adrastus
  - Tecmesa
  - Teutras
- Varro (116–27 BC)
  - Saturarum Menippearum libri CL or Menippean Satires in 150 books
  - Antiquitates rerum humanarum et divinarum libri XLI
  - Logistoricon libri LXXVI
  - Hebdomades vel de imaginibus
  - Disciplinarum libri IX
- Marcus Tullius Cicero (106 BC – 43 BC)
  - Hortensius a dialogue also known as "On Philosophy".
  - Consolatio, written to soothe his own sadness at the death of his daughter Tullia.
  - De Natura Deorum is partially lost.
  - De re publica has survived only partially intact.
- Quintus Tullius Cicero (102 – 43 BC)
  - Troades
  - Erigona
  - Electra
- Gaius Julius Caesar (100 BC – 44 BC)
  - Anticatonis Libri II (only fragments survived)
  - Carmina et prolusiones (only fragments survived)
  - De analogia libri II ad M. Tullium Ciceronem
  - De astris liber
  - Dicta collectanea ("collected sayings", also known by the Greek title άποφθέγματα)
  - Letters (only fragments survived)
    - Epistulae ad Ciceronem ('Letters to Cicero')
    - Epistulae ad familiares ('Letters to Relatives')
  - Iter ('journey')) (only one fragment survived)
  - Laudes Herculis
  - Libri auspiciorum ("books of auspices", also known as Auguralia)
  - Oedipus
  - other works:
    - contributions to the libri pontificales as pontifex maximus
    - possibly some early love poems
- Lucius Afranius (1st-century BC)
  - Abducta (Abducted Woman)
  - Aequales (Just Alike)
  - Auctio (Auction)
  - Augur (The Augur)
  - Brundisiae (Women from Brundisium)
  - Cinerarius (Male Hair-Curler)
  - Compitalia (The Compitalia Festival)
  - Consobrini (Cousins)
  - Crimen (Crime)
  - Deditio (The Surrender)
  - Depositum (Deposit)
  - Divortium (Divorce)
  - Emancipatus (The Emancipated Man)
  - Epistula (The Letter)
- Santra (1st-century BC)
  - De Antiquitate Verborum
  - Nuptiae Bacchi
- Dorsennus (1st-century BC)
  - Acharistio
- Scribonius Aphrodisius (1st-century BC)
  - Critique on the De Orthographia of Verrius Flaccus.
- Tanusius Geminus (1st-century BC)
  - Annales
- Titus Quinctius Atta (d. 77 BC)
  - Aedilicia
  - Aquae Caldae
  - Conciliatrix (Matchmaker)
  - Gratulatio
  - Lucubratio
  - Materterae (Maternal Aunts)
  - Megalensia (The Megalensia Festival)
  - Nurus (Daughter-in-Law)
  - Satura
  - Socrus (Mother-in-Law)
  - Supplicatio
  - Tiro Proficiscens (Tiro Setting Forth)
- Lucius Pomponius
  - Aleones ("The Gamblers")
  - Bucco Adoptatus
  - Bucco Auctoratus
  - Capella ("The She-Goat")
  - Citharista
  - Collegium ("The College," or "The Guild")
  - Concha
  - Condiciones ("The Contracts")
  - Decuma
  - Dives ("The Rich Man")
  - Fullones ("The Cloth-Fullers")
  - Heres Petitor
  - Hirnea Pappi ("Pappus's Jug")
  - Kalendae Martiae ("The First Day of March")
  - Lar Familiaris
  - Leno ("The Pimp")
  - Macchus Miles ("Macchus the Soldier")
  - Macchus Sequester
  - Macchus Virgo ("Macchus the Virgin")
  - Medicus ("The Physician")
  - Munda
  - Nuptiae ("The Wedding")
  - Pannuceati
  - Pappus Agricola ("Pappus the Farmer")
  - Pappus Praeteritus ("Pappus the Departed," not to be confused with the eponymous of Quintus Novius)
  - Parci ("Stingy Men")
  - Patruus ("The Paternal Uncle")
  - Philosophia ("Philosophy")
  - Pictores ("The Painters")
  - Piscatores ("The Fishermen")
  - Pistor ("The Baker")
  - Placenta ("The Cake")
  - Porcetra
  - Praeco Posterior
  - Praefectus Morum ("Supervisor of Morals")
  - Prostibulum ("The Prostitute")
  - Pseudo-Agamemnon (“Supposititious Agamemnon”)
  - Pytho Gorgonius
  - Quinquatrus
  - Rusticus ("The Country-Dweller")
  - Sarcularia
  - Satura ("The Satire")
  - Sponsa Pappi ("Pappus's Fiancee")
  - Synepheboi (Fellow Adolescents")
  - Syri ("The Syrians")
  - Vacca vel Marsuppium ("The Cow" or "The Pouch")
  - Verniones
  - Verres Aegrotus ("Sick Verres")
  - Verres Salvos ("Healthy Verres")
  - Marsyas
- Gaius Asinius Pollio (75 BC – AD 4)
  - Historiae (Histories)
  - Epitome by Gaius Asinius Pollio of Tralles
- Lucius Varius Rufus (c. 74 – 14 BC)
  - De Morte
  - Thyestes
- Gaius Cassius Parmensis (c. 74 BC - 31 or 30 BCE)
  - Brutus
  - Thyestes
- Gaius Maecenas (c. 70 – 8 BC)
  - Prometheus; descriptive fragments from some other authors survive. Construct of book is surmised by researchers.
- Marcus Valerius Messalla Corvinus (64 BC – AD 8 or c. 12)
  - Memoirs of the civil wars after the death of Caesar, used by Suetonius and Plutarch
  - Bucolic poems in Greek
- Strabo ( 64 or 63 BC – c. 24 AD)
  - History
- Augustus (63 BC – AD 14)
  - Rescript to Brutus Respecting Cato
  - Exhortations to Philosophy
  - History of His Own Life
  - Sicily (a work in verse)
  - Epigrams
  - Aiax
- Livy (59 BC – AD 17)
  - 107 of the 142 books of Ab Urbe Condita, a history of Rome are lost
- Verrius Flaccus (c. 55 BC – AD 20)
  - De Orthographia: De Obscuris Catonis, an elucidation of obscurities in the writings of Cato the Elder
  - Saturnus, dealing with questions of Roman ritual
  - Rerum memoria dignarum libri, an encyclopaedic work much used by Pliny the Elder
  - Res Etruscae, probably on augury
- Juba II (c. 48 BCE-23 CE)
  - Roman Archaeology, in two books
  - Resemblances, in at least fifteen books
  - On Painting, in at least eight books
  - Theatrical History, in at least seventeen books
  - The Wanderings of Hanno, possibly a translation of the periplus of Hanno the Navigator
  - On Euphorbion, a pamphlet
  - Libyka, in at least three books
  - On Arabia, which is the only work by Juba that may have been in Latin
  - On Assyria, in two books
  - Epigrams, of which six lines of one quoted by Athenaeus are all that survives
- Helvius Cinna (died 20 March 44 BC)
  - Zmyrna, a mythological epic poem about the incestuous love of Smyrna (or Myrrha) for her father Cinyras
- Ovid 43 BC – 17/18 AD)
  - Medea, of which only two fragments survive.
- Tiberius (42 BC – AD 37)
  - Autobiography ("brief and sketchy", per Suetonius)
- Quintus Novius (fl.30 BC)
  - Agricola ("The Farmer")
  - Asinus ("The Donkey")
  - Buccolo ("Little Bucco")
  - Dotata ("The Lady Who Received Her Dowry")
  - Eculeus ("The Foal")
  - Exodium
  - Fullones ("The Cloth-Fullers")
  - Fullones Feriati ("Cloth-Fullers on Holiday")
  - Funus ("The Funeral")
  - Gallinaria ("The Henhouse")
  - Gemini ("The Twins")
  - Hercules Coactor ("Hercules the Money-Collector")
  - Hetaera ("The Courtesan")
  - Lignaria ("The Female Carpenter")
  - Macchus Copo ("Macchus the Innkeeper")
  - Macchus Exsul ("Macchus the Exile")
  - Mania Medica ("Medical Mania")
  - Optio ("The Choice")
  - Pacilius
  - Pappus Praeteritus ("Pappus the Departed," not to be confused with the play by Lucius Pomponius of the same name)
  - Parcus ("The Stingy Man")
  - Picus ("The Woodpecker")
  - Quaestio ("The Trial")
  - Sanniones ("The Clowns")
  - Surdus (“The Deaf Man”)
  - Tabellaria ("The Female Mail-Carrier")
  - Togularia
  - Tripertita
  - Vindemiatores (“The Grape Harvesters”)
  - Virgo Praegnans ("The Pregnant Virgin")
  - Zona ("The Girdle")
- Claudius (10 BC – AD 54)
  - De arte aleae (The art of playing dice, a book on dice games)
  - an Etruscan dictionary
  - Tyrrhenika, twenty volumes on Etruscan history
  - a history of Augustus's reign
  - Carchedonica, eight volumes on Carthaginian history
  - a defense of Cicero against the charges of Asinius Gallus
- Seneca the Younger (c. 4 BC – AD 65)
  - Book on signs, 5000 were compiled
  - Against Superstitions, Augustine preserved some passages.
  - Book on medicine. Either a planned or lost literary work
- Sulpicia (1st century CE)
  - All of her poems are lost save for one fragment. She wrote erotic poems of conjugal bliss and was herself the subject of two poems by Martial, who wrote (10.35) that "All girls who desire to please one man should read Sulpicia. All husbands who desire to please one wife should read Sulpicia."
- Agrippina the Younger (AD 15 – AD 59)
  - Casus suorum (Misfortunes of her Family, a memoir)
- Pliny the Elder (AD 23/24 – 79)
  - History of the German Wars, some quotations survive in Tacitus's Annals and Germania
  - Studiosus, a detailed work on rhetoric
  - Dubii sermonis, in eight books
  - History of his Times, in thirty-one books, also quoted by Tacitus.
  - De jaculatione equestri, a military handbook on missiles thrown from horseback.
- Quintilian (c. 35 – c. 100 AD)
  - De Causis Corruptae Eloquentiae (On the Causes of Corrupted Eloquence)
- Lucan (39 AD – 65 AD)
  - Catachthonion
  - Iliacon from the Trojan cycle
  - Epigrammata
  - Adlocutio ad Pollam
  - Silvae
  - Saturnalia
  - Medea
  - Salticae Fabulae
  - Laudes Neronis, a praise of Nero
  - Orpheus
  - Prosa oratio in Octavium Sagittam
  - Epistulae ex Campania
  - De Incendio Urbis
- Frontinus (c. 40 – 103 AD)
  - De re militari, a military manual
- Trajan (AD 53 – 117)
  - Dacica (or De bello dacico)
- Philo of Byblos (c. 64 – 141)
  - Phoenician History, a Greek translation of the original Phoenician book attributed to Sanchuniathon. Considerable fragments have been preserved, chiefly by Eusebius in the Praeparatio evangelica (i.9; iv.16).
- Suetonius (c. AD 69 – after AD 122)
  - De Viris Illustribus (On Famous Men – in the field of literature), to which belongs: De Illustribus Grammaticis (Lives Of The Grammarians), De Claris Rhetoribus (Lives Of The Rhetoricians), and Lives Of The Poets. Some fragments exist.
  - Lives of Famous Whores
  - Royal Biographies
  - Roma (On Rome), in four parts: Roman Manners & Customs, The Roman Year, The Roman Festivals, and Roman Dress.
  - Greek Games
  - On Public Offices
  - On Cicero’s Republic
  - The Physical Defects of Mankind
  - Methods of Reckoning Time
  - An Essay on Nature
  - Greek Terms of Abuse
  - Grammatical Problems
  - Critical Signs Used in Books
- Apuleius (c. 124 – after 170)
  - Numerous lost works, including a novel, Hermagoras, as well as poetry, dialogues, hymns, and technical treatises on politics, dendrology, agriculture, medicine, natural history, astronomy, music, and arithmetic.
- Julius Pollux (fl. 2nd century AD)
  - Onomasticon
- Septimius Severus (145 – 211)
  - Autobiography
- Callinicus (3rd century AD)
  - Against the Philosophical Sects
  - On the Renewal of Rome
  - Prosphonetikon to Gallienus, a salute addressed to the emperor
  - To Cleopatra, On the History of Alexandria, most likely dedicated to Zenobia, who claimed descent from Cleopatra
  - To Lupus, On Bad Taste on Rhetoric
- Longinus (c. 213 – 273 AD)
  - On The End: by Longinus in answer to Plotinus and Gentilianus Amelius (preface survives, quoted by Porphyry)
  - On Impulse
  - On Principles
  - Lover of Antiquity
  - On the Natural Life
  - Difficulties in Homer
  - Whether Homer is a Philosopher
  - Homeric Problems and Solutions
  - Things Contrary to History which the Grammarians Explain as Historical
  - On Words in Homer with Multiple Senses
  - Attic Diction
  - Lexicon of Antimachus and Heracleon
- Zenobia (c. 240 – c. 274)
  - Epitome of the history of Alexandria and the Orient (according to the Historia Augusta)
- Gaius Asinius Quadratus (fl. AD 248)
  - The Millennium, a thousand-year history of Rome; thirty fragments remain
- Decius (3rd century AD)
  - An edict, dated to 250 AD.
- Sulpicius Alexander (late fourth century AD)
  - Historia (History)
- Renatus Profuturus Frigeridus (5th century AD)
  - A historical work of twelve volumes of which only brief fragments survive, a few passages being quoted in chapters eight and nine of the second book of Gregory of Tours's Decem libri historiarum (Ten Books of Histories)

=== Amerindian texts and codices ===
- The original Aztec codices were burned by Tlacaelel after Itzcoatl took power.
- Most Maya codices were burned by Spanish priests in the sixteenth century.
- Many Inca Quipus (an ancient device used for record keeping and communication) were burned by Spanish priests in 1583 on the orders of the Third Council of Lima. Only 751 quipus are known to have survived to the present.

=== Ancient Chinese texts ===
- Classic of Music attributed to Confucius.
- Medical treatise of the renowned physician Hua Tuo (traditional Chinese: 華佗; simplified Chinese: 华陀; pinyin: Huà Tuó) from late Eastern Han. The treatise was traditionally referred to as Qing Nang Shu (traditional Chinese 青囊書; simplified Chinese: 青囊书; pinyin: Qīng Náng Shū), literally Book in the Cyan Bag. When Hua Tuo was sentenced to death after incurring the wrath of Cao Cao, who controlled the Imperial Court, the physician tried to entrust the text to his gaoler. However, the gaoler was afraid of potentially implicating himself and in disappointment, Hua Tuo had the text burned. Records of the Three Kingdoms Chapter 29, Book of Wei – Technology 《三国志卷二十九·魏书·方技传》
- Book of Bai Ze (simplified Chinese 白泽图; pinyin: Bái Zé Tú). A guide to the forms and habits of all 11,520 types of supernatural creatures in the world, and how to overcome their hauntings and attacks, as dictated by the mythical creature, Bai Ze, to the Yellow Emperor in the 26th century BCE.
- Works of the 5th century BCE philosopher Yang Zhu burned on the orders of the emperor Shi Huangdi, the founder of the Qin dynasty

==== Known authors ====
- Ancheng (安成), first name unknown
  - Chen Ancheng Weiyang Shu (臣安成未央術) ("Minister Ancheng’s Weiyang Arts"), 1 part. Classified into the School of Minor Tales.
- Cai (蔡氏), first name unknown
  - Canshi Yizhuan (蔡氏易傳) ("Cai’s Commentary on the Changes"), 2 parts.
- Cai Gui (蔡癸)
  - Cai Gui (蔡癸), 1 part. Classified into the School of Agriculturalists.
- Cao Yu (曹羽)
  - Cao Yu (曹羽) ("Cao Yu"), 2 parts. Classified into the School of Taoists.
- Changlu (長盧氏), first name unknown
  - Changluzi (長盧子), 9 parts. Classified into the School of Taoists.
- Chao Cuo (鼂錯)
  - Chao Cuo (鼂錯), 31 parts. Classified into the School of Legalists.
- Chen Jun (臣君)
  - Chen Junzi (臣君子), 2 parts. Classified into the School of Taoists.
- Chenggong Sheng (成公生)
  - Chenggong Sheng (成公生), 5 parts. Classified into the School of Names.
- Deng Xi (鄧析)
  - Deng Xi (鄧析) ("Deng Xi"), 2 parts. Classified into the School of Names.
- Ding Kuan (丁寬)
  - Dingshi Yizhuan (丁氏易傳) ("Ding’s Commentary on the Changes"), 8 parts.
- Dong Anguo (董安國)
  - Dong Anguo (董安國), 16 parts. Classified into the School of Agriculturalists.
- Dong Wuxin (董無心)
  - Dongzi (董子), 1 part. Classified into the School of Confucius.
- Dong Zhongshu (董仲舒)
  - Chunqiu Gongyang Dong Zhongshu Zhiyu (春秋公羊董仲舒治獄) ("Dong Zhongshu’s Judgments on Gongyang’s Spring and Autumn"), 16 parts
  - Dong Zhongshu (董仲舒), 123 parts. Classified into the School of Confucius.
- Dongfang Shuo (東方朔)
  - Dongfang Shuo (東方朔), 20 parts. Classified into the School of Syncretists.
- Du Lin (杜林)
  - Cangjie Gu (蒼頡故) ("Explanations on Cangjie"), 1 part.
  - Cangjie Xunzuan (蒼頡訓纂) ("Compiled Instructions on Cangjie"), 1 part.
- Du Wengong (杜文公)
  - Du Wengong (杜文公), 5 parts. Classified into the School of Naturalists.
- Duo Jiao (鐸椒)
  - Chunqiu Duo Shi Wei (春秋鐸氏微) ("Duo‘s Subtle Explanations of the Spring and Autumn"), 3 parts.
- Fan Shengzhi (氾勝之)
  - Fan Shengzhi (氾勝之), 18 parts. Classified into the School of Agriculturalists.
- Feng Cu (馮促)
  - Feng Cu (馮促), 13 parts. Classified into the School of Diplomacy.
- Feng Shang (馮商)
  - Xu Taishigong (續太史公) ("Continuation of the Records of the Grand Historian"), 7 parts.
- Fu Buqi (宓不齊)
  - Fuzi (宓子), 16 parts. Classified into the School of Confucius.
- Fu Guang (服光)
  - Fushi Yizhuan (服氏易傳) ("Fu’s Commentary on the Changes"), 2 parts.
- Gongchou Sheng (公檮生)
  - Zhongshen (終始) ("Ends and Beginnings"), 14 parts. Sourced from Zhou Shi's Shizhong.
- Gongshu Wenzi (公叔文子)
  - Gongsun Fa (公孫發), 22 parts. Classified into the School of Naturalists.
- Gongsun Gu (公孫固)
  - Gongsun Gu (公孫固), 1 part. Classified into the School of Confucius.
- Gongsun Hong (公孫弘)
  - Gongsun Hong (公孫弘), 10 parts. Classified into the School of Confucius.
- Gongsun Kunxie (公孫昆邪)
  - Gongsun Hunxie (公孫渾邪), 15 parts. Classified into the School of Naturalists.
- Gongsun Long (公孫龍)
  - Lost 8 parts of Gongsun Longzi (公孫龍子).
- Gongsun Ni (公孫尼)
  - Gongsun Nizi (公孫尼子), 28 parts. Classified into the School of Confucius.
  - Gongsun Ni (公孫尼), 1 part. Classified into the School of Syncretists.
- Gongyang Gao (公羊高)
  - Original Chunqiu Gongyang Zaji (春秋公羊雜記) ("Gongyang’s Miscellaneous Records of Spring and Autumn on the Spring and Autumn"), 83 parts.
  - Chunqiu Gongyang Zhangju (春秋公羊章句) ("Gongyang’s Line-by-Line Commentaries on the Spring and Autumn"), 38 parts.
- Guliang Chi (穀梁赤)
  - Chunqiu Guliang Waizhuan (春秋穀梁外传) ("Guliang’s Outer Commentary on the Spring and Autumn"), 20 parts.
  - Chunqiu Guliang Zhangju (春秋穀梁章句) ("Guliang’s Line-by-Line Commentary on the Spring and Autumn"), 33 parts.
- Han Ying (scholar) (韓嬰)
  - Han Shi Gu (韓詩故) ("Character Explanations on Han’s Poetry"), 36 volumes.
  - Han Shi Neizhuan (韓詩内傳) ("Inner Commentary on Han’s Poetry"), 4 volumes (might be merged with the existing versions of Han Shi Waizhuan).
  - Han Shi Shuo (韓詩說) ("Explanations on Han’s Poetry"), 41 volumes.
  - Hanshi Yizhuan (韓氏易傳) ("Han’s Commentary on the Changes"), 2 parts.
  - Han's version of Shijing (詩經) ("Classic of Poetry"), 28 volumes. Lost in the 11th century.
- Hou Cang (后蒼)
  - Qi Shi Houshi Gu (齊詩后氏故) ("Hou’s Character Explanations on Qi Poetry"), 20 volumes.
  - Qi Shi Houshi Zhuan (齊詩后氏傳) ("Hou’s Commentary on Qi Poetry"), 39 volumes.
  - The Qi (齊) version of Shijing (詩經) ("Classic of Poetry"), 28 volumes. Lost in the 2nd century.
  - Qutai Ji (曲臺記) ("Record of Qutai"), 9 parts. Classified into the Art of Rites.
  - Xiaojing Shuo (孝經后氏說) ("Hou’s Explanations on the Classic of Filial Piety"), 1 part.
- Hufei (胡非氏), first name unknown
  - Hufeizi (胡非子), 3 parts. Classified into the School of Mohists.
- Huang Ci (黄疵)
  - Huang Gong (黃公), 4 parts. Classified into the School of Names.
- Hui Shi (惠施)
  - Huizi (惠子), 1 part. Classified into the School of Names.
- Jia Shan (賈山)
  - Jia Shan (賈山), 8 parts. Classified into the School of Confucius.
- Jiang Weng (江翁)
  - Xiaojing Jiangshi Shuo (孝經江氏說) ("Jiang’s Explanations on the Classic of Filial Piety"), 1 part.
- Jie (捷氏), first name unknown
  - Jiezi (捷子), 2 parts. Classified into the School of Taoists.
- Jing Fang (京房)
  - Jing Shi Duanjia (京氏段嘉), 12 parts. Related to Yijing.
- Ju (劇氏), first name unknown
  - Chuzi (處子), 9 parts. Classified into the School of Legalists.
- Kong Ji (孔伋)
  - Zisi (子思), 23 parts. Classified into the School of Confucius.
- Kongjia (孔甲)
  - Panyu (盤盂) ("Pans and Basins"), 26 parts. Classified into the School of Syncretists.
- Kong Qiu (孔丘)
  - Lost 6 parts of Kongzi Sanchao (孔子三朝) ("Confucius’ Three Audiences").
  - The 21st and 22nd parts of the Qi version of Lunyu (論語) ("Analects").
- Kong Zang (孔臧)
  - Kong Zang (孔臧), 10 parts. Classified into the School of Confucius.
- Kuai Tong (蒯通)
  - Kuaizi (蒯子), 5 parts. Classified into the School of Diplomacy.
- Lao (老氏), first name unknown
  - Laolaizi (老萊子), 16 parts. Classified into the School of Taoists.
- Li Buchang (李步昌)
  - Li Buchang (李步昌), 8 parts. Classified into the School of Confucius.
- Li Chang (李長)
  - Yuanshang Pian (元尚篇) ("Yuanshang Primer"), 1 part.
- Li Ke (李克)
  - Li Ke (李克), 7 parts. Classified into the School of Confucius.
- Li Kui (李悝)
  - Lizi (李子), 32 parts. Classified into the School of Legalists.
- Li Si (李斯)
  - Cangjie Pian (蒼頡篇) ("Cangjie Primer"), 1 part. Lost in the 9th century. Partly discovered.
- Liangqiu He (梁丘賀)
  - Yijing Zhangju (易經章句) ("Line-by-Line Commentaries of the Book of Changes"), 2 parts.
- Liao Cang (聊蒼)
  - Liao Cang (聊蒼), 3 parts. Classified into the School of Diplomacy.
- Liu An (劉安)
  - Huainan Daoxun (淮南道訓) ("Huainan’s Guidance on Taoism"), 2 parts. Related to Yijing.
  - Huainan Wai (淮南外) ("Huainanzi Outer Chapters"), 33 parts.
- Liu Bang (劉邦)
  - Gaozu Zhuan (高祖傳) ("Biography of Emperor Gaozu"), 13 parts. Classified into the School of Confucius.
- Liu De (劉德)
  - Hejian Xianwang Dui Shangxia San Yonggong (河閒獻王對上下三雍宫) ("Responses of Prince Xian of Hejian to Upper and Lower Three Yong Palaces"), 3 parts. Classified into the School of Confucius.
- Liu Heng (劉恆)
  - Xiaowen Zhuan (孝文傳) ("Biography of Emperor Xiaowen"), 11 parts. Classified into the School of Confucius.
- Liu Jing (劉敬)
  - Liu Jing (劉敬), 3 parts. Classified into the School of Confucius.
- Liu Xiang (劉向)
  - Lost 30 parts of Liu Xiang Suo Xu (劉向所序) ("Liu Xiang’s Prefaces") except for Shuoyuan (說苑), Lienu Zhuan (列女傳) and the survived 10 parts of Xinxu (新序)
  - Liu Xiang Wuxing Zhuanji (劉向五行傳記) ("Liu Xiang’s Records of the Five Elements"), 11 volumes. Related to Shangshu.
  - Shuo Laozi (說老子) ("Discussions on Laozi"), 4 parts.
  - Xin Guoyu (新國語) ("New Discourses of the States"), 54 parts. Organized from Guoyu.
- Liu Xin (劉歆)
  - Zhouguan Jing (周官經) ("Classic of Zhou Offices"), 6 parts. Classified into the Art of Rites.
- Liu Xun (劉詢)
  - Chunqiu Yizou (春秋議奏) ("Discussions and Memorials on the Spring and Autumn"), 39 parts. A collection of memorials for the Shiquge Conference.
  - Li Yizou (禮議奏) ("Discussions and Memorials on the Rites"), 38 parts. A collection of memorials for the Shiquge Conference.
  - Lunyu Yizou (論語議奏) ("Discussions and Memorials on the Analects"), 18 parts. A collection of memorials for the Shiquge Conference.
  - Shangshu Yizou (尚書議奏) ("Discussions and Memorials on the Book of Documents"), 42 parts.A collection of memorials for the Shiquge Conference.
  - Wujing Zayi (五經雜議) ("Miscellaneous Discussions on the Five Classics"), 18 parts. A collection of discussions for the Shiquge Conference.
- Long De (龍德)
  - Yaqin Longshi (雅琴龍氏) ("Long’s Elegant Zither"), 99 parts. Classified into the Art of Music.
- Lu Jia (陸賈)
  - Chu Han Chunqiu (楚漢春秋) ("Spring and Autumn of Chu and Han"), 9 parts. Lost in the 12th century.
  - Lost 11 parts of Lu Jia (陸賈) except Xinyu (新語) ("New Discourses”).
- Lu Zhonglian (魯仲連)
  - Lu Zhonglianzi (魯仲連子), 14 parts. Classified into the School of Confucius.
- Lü Wang (呂望)
  - Tai Gong (太公) Lost parts of, 237 parts. Classified into the School of Taoists.
- Lüqiu Kuai (閭丘快)
  - Lüqiuzi (閭丘子), 13 parts.
- Mao (毛氏), first name unknown
  - Mao Gong (毛公), 9 parts. Classified into the School of Names.
- Mao Heng (毛亨)
  - Mao Shi Guxun Zhuan (毛詩故訓傳) ("Explanatory Commentary on Mao’s Poetry"), 30 volumes.
- Meng Xi (孟喜)
  - Meng Shi Jingfang (孟氏京房), 11 parts. Related to Yijing.
  - Yijing Zhangju (易經章句) ("Line-by-Line Commentaries on the Book of Changes"), 2 parts. Related to Yijing.
  - Zaiyi Meng Shi Jingfang (灾異孟氏京房), 66 parts. Related to Yijing.
- Mi Ying (芉嬰)
  - Mizi (芉子), 18 parts. Classified into the School of Confucius.
- Mo Di (墨翟)
  - Lost 18 parts of Mozi (墨子)
- Ni Kuan (兒寬)
  - Fengchan Yidui (封禪議對) ("Discussions on and Responses of Fengshan"), 19 parts. Classified into the Art of Rites.
  - Ni Kuan (兒寬), 9 parts. Classified into the School of Confucius.
- Ning Yue (甯越)
  - Ning Yue (甯越), 1 part. Classified into the School of Confucius.
- Ouyang Sheng (歐陽生)
  - Shangshu Ouyang Jing (尚書歐陽經) ("Ouyang’s Classic of the Book of Documents"), 32 volumes.
  - Shangshu Ouyang Shuoyi (尚書歐陽說義) ("Ouyang’s Meaning Explanations on the Book of Documents"), 2 parts.
  - Shangshu Ouyang Zhangju (尚書歐陽章句) ("Ouyang’s Line-by-Line Commentary on the Book of Documents"), 31 volumes.
- Pang Xuan (龐煖)
  - Pang Xuan (龐煖), 2 parts. Classified into the School of Diplomacy.
- Qian Lou (黔娄)
  - Qian Louzi (黔婁子), 4 parts. Classified into the School of Taoists.
- Qidiao Kai (漆雕開)
  - Qidiaozi (漆彫子), 13 parts. Classified into the School of Confucius.
- Rao (饒), first name unknown
  - Chen Rao Xinshu (臣饒心術) ("Minister Rao’s Mental Arts"), 25 parts.
- Rongcheng Zihuang (容城子黃)
  - Rongchengzi (容成子), 14 parts. Classified into the School of Naturalists.
- Shang Yang (商鞅)
  - Lost 5 parts of Shang Jun (商君) ("Lord Shang").
- Shen Buhai (申不害)
  - Lost parts of Shenzi (申子), 6 parts. Classified into the School of Legalists.
- Shen Dao (慎到)
  - Lost 35 parts of Shenzi (慎子).
- Shen Pei (申培)
  - Lu Shi Gu (鲁詩故) ("Character Explanations of Lu Poetry"), 25 volumes.
  - Lu Shi Shuo (鲁詩說) ("Explanations of Lu Poetry"), 28 volumes.
  - The Lu (鲁) version of Shijing (詩經) ("Classic of Poetry"), 28 volumes. Lost in the 3th century.
- Shi Chou (施雠)
  - Yijing Zhangju (易經章句) ("Line-by-Line Commentaries of the Book of Changes"), 2 parts.
- Shi Jiao (尸佼)
  - Shizi (尸子), 20 parts. Lost in 12th century. Classified into the School of Syncretists.
- Shi Shuo (世碩)
  - Shizi (世子), 21 parts. Classified into the School of Confucius.
- Shi Zhong (師中)
  - Yaqin Shishi (雅琴師氏) ("Shi’s Elegant Zither"), 8 parts. Classified into the Art of Music.
- Shou (壽), first name unknown
  - Chen Shou Zhouji (臣壽周紀) ("Minister Shou’s Zhou Records"), 7 parts.
- Sima Qian (司馬遷)
  - Original version of the missing 10 parts of Taishigong (太史公) ("Records of the Grand Historian").
- Sima Xiangru (司馬相如)
  - Fanjiang Pian (凡將篇) ("Fanjiang Primer"), 1 part.
  - Jing Ke Lun (荊軻論) ("Discourses on Jing Ke"), 5 parts. Classified into the School of Syncretists.
- Song Jian (宋鈃)
  - Songzi (宋子), 18 parts. Classified into the School of Legalists.
- Su Qin (蘇秦)
  - Suzi (蘇子), 21 parts. Classified into the School of Diplomacy.
- Sui Chao (随巢)
  - Sui Chaozi (隨巢子), 6 parts. Classified into the School of Mohists.
- Tian Jiu (田鳩)
  - Tian Qiuzi (田俅子), 3 parts. Classified into the School of Mohists.
- Tian Pian (田駢)
  - Tianzi (田子), 25 parts. Classified into the School of Taoists.
- Tian Yinqi (田因齊)
  - Junli Sima Fa (軍禮司馬法) ("Sima’s Art of War on Military Rites"), 155 parts.
- Wang Jun (王駿)
  - Lu Lunyu Wangjun Shuo (鲁論語王駿说) ("Wang Jun’s Explanations on Lu Analects"), 20 parts.
- Wang Tong (王同)
  - Wangshi Yizhuan (王氏易傳) ("Wang’s Commentary on the Changes"), 2 parts.
- Wang Yu (王禹)
  - Wang Yu Ji (王禹記) ("Wang Yu’s Records"), 24 parts. A compilation of Yuejing.
- Wangshi (王史氏), first name unknown
  - Wangshi Shi (王史氏), 21 parts. Classified into the Art of Rites.
- Wei Liao (尉缭)
  - Lost 36 parts of Wei Liao (尉繚).
- Wei Mou (魏牟)
  - Gongzi Mou (公子牟) ("Prince Mou"), 4 parts. Classified into the School of Taoists.
- Wei Si (魏斯)
  - Fajing (法經) ("Classic of Laws"), 6 parts. Classified into the School of Confucius.
- Wu Yuan (伍員)
  - Wu Zixu (五子胥), 8 parts. Classified into the School of Syncretists.
- Wulu Chongzong (五鹿充宗)
  - Yijing Lueshuo (易經略說) ("Concise Explanatons on the Book of Changes"), 3 parts.
- Wuqiu Shouwang (吾丘壽王)
  - Wuqiu Shouwang (吾丘壽王), 6 parts. Classified into the School of Confucius.
- Xiahou Jian (夏侯建)
  - Shangshu Xiao Xiahou Zhangju (尚書小夏侯章句) ("Junior Xiahou’s Line-by-Line Commentaries on the Book of Documents"), 29 volumes.
- Xiahou Sheng (夏侯勝)
  - Shangshu Da Xiahou Zhangju (尚書大夏侯章句) ("Senior Xiahou’s Line-by-Line Commentaries on the Book of Documents"), 29 volumes.
- Xiahou Sheng (夏侯勝) & Xiahou Jian (夏侯建)
  - Shangshu Da-Xiao Xiahou Jiegu (尚書大小夏侯解故) ("Senior & Junior Xiahou’s Explanations on the Book of Documents"), 29 parts.
- Xian (賢), first name unknown
  - Boshi Chen Xian Dui (博士臣賢對) ("Erudite Minister Xian’s Responses"), 1 part. A refutation of Han Fei and Shang Yang.
- Xin (信), last name unknown
  - Xin (信) ("Xin"), 1 part. A refutation of Li Si. Classified into the School of Diplomacy.
- Xin Jia (辛甲)
  - Xin Jia (辛甲), 29 parts. Classified into the School of Taoists.
- Xu (徐氏), first name unknown
  - Xuzi (徐子), 42 parts. Classified into the School of Confucius.
- Xu Le (徐樂)
  - Xu Le (徐樂), 1 part. Classified into the School of Diplomacy.
- Xu Shang (許商)
  - Xu Shang Wuxing Zhuanji (許商五行傳記) ("Xu Shang’s Records of the Five Elements"), 1 part. Related to Shangshu.
- Xu Shaoji (徐少季)
  - Laozi Xushi Jingshuo (老子徐氏經說) ("Xu’s Explanations on Laozi"), 6 parts.
- Xun Kuang (荀況)
  - Yuqiu Shuo (虞丘說) ("Explanations of Yuqiu"), 1 part. Classified into the School of Confucius.
- Yan Anle (顔安樂)
  - Chunqiu Gongyang Yanshi Ji (春秋公羊顔氏記) ("Yan’s Records on Gongyang’s Spring and Autumn"), 11 parts.
- Yang Qian (羊千)
  - Yangzi (羊子), 4 parts. Classified into the School of Confucius.
- Yang He (楊何)
  - Yangshi Yizhuan (楊氏易傳) ("Yang’s Commentary on the Changes"), 2 parts.
- Yang Xiong (揚雄)
  - Cangjie Xunzuan (蒼頡訓纂) ("Compiled Instructions on Cangjie"), 1 part.
  - Xunzuan Pian (訓纂篇) ("Primer of Compiled Instructions"), 1 part.
  - Lost 16 parts of Yang Xiong Suo Xu (揚雄所序) ("Yang Xiong’s Prefaces") except for Fayan (法言) and Taixuan Jing (太玄經).
- Yi Feng (翼奉)
  - Xiaojing Shuo (孝經翼氏說) ("Yi’s Explanations on the Classic of Filial Piety"), 1 part.
- Yi Yin (伊尹)
  - Yi Yin (伊尹), 51 parts. Classified into the School of Taoists.
- Yin Wen (尹文)
  - Original version of Yin Wenzi (尹文子), 1 part. Classified into the School of Names.
- Yin Yi (尹佚)
  - Yin Yi (尹佚), 2 parts. Classified into the School of Mohists.
- Yingqi (嬰齊), last name unknown
  - Yingqi (嬰齊), 12 parts. Classified into the School of Taoists.
- You Yu (由余)
  - You Yu (由余), 3 parts. Classified into the School of Syncretists.
- Yu Chang (于長)
  - Tianxia Zhongchen (天下忠臣) ("Loyal Ministers of the Realm"), 9 parts. Classified into the School of Diplomacy.
- Yu Chu (虞初)
  - Yu Chu Zhoushuo (虞初周說) ("Yu Chu’s Zhou Tales"), 943 parts. Classified into the School of Minor Tales.
- Yu Qing
  - Chunqiu Yushi Wei Zhuan (春秋虞氏微傳) ("Yu’s Subtle Explanative Commentary"), 2 parts.
  - Yu Shi Chunqiu (虞氏春秋) ("Yu’s Spring and Autumn"), 15 parts. Classified into the School of Confucius.
- Yu Xiong (鬻熊)
  - Original version of Yuzi (鬻子), 22 parts. Classified into the School of Taoists.
- Huan Yuan (環淵)
  - Yuanzi (蜎子), 13 parts. Classified into the School of Taoists.
- Yue (說), first name unknown
  - Chen Yue (臣說) ("Minister Yue"), 3 parts. Classified into the School of Syncretists.
- Zhang Cang (張蒼)
  - Zhang Cang (張蒼), 16 parts. Classified into the School of Naturalists.
- Zhang Yi (張儀)
  - Zhangzi (張子), 10 parts. Classified into the School of Diplomacy.
- Zhang Yu (張禹)
  - Lu Anchang Hou Shuo (魯論語安昌侯說) ("Marquis of Anchang’s Explanations on Lu Analects"), 21 parts.
  - Xiaojing Shuo (孝經張氏說) ("Zhang’s Explanations on the Classic of Filial Piety"), 1 part.
- Zhao Ding (趙定)
  - Yaqin Zhaoshi (雅琴趙氏) ("Zhao’s Elegant Zither"), 7 parts. Classified into the Art of Music.
- Zhong Jun (終軍)
  - Zhong Jun (終軍), 8 parts. Classified into the School of Confucius.
- Zhou Bo (周伯)
  - Zhou Bo (周伯), 11 parts. Classified into the School of Naturalists.
- Zhou Wangsun (周王孫)
  - Zhoushi Yizhuan (周氏易傳) ("Zhou’s Commentary on the Changes"), 2 parts.
- Zhu Jian (朱建)
  - Pingyuan Jun (平原君) ("Lord Pingyuan"), 7 parts. Classified into the School of Confucius.
- Zhuang An (莊安)
  - Zhuang An (莊安), 1 part. Classified into the School of Diplomacy.
- Zhuang Zhu (莊助)
  - Zhuang Zhu (莊助), 4 parts. Classified into the School of Confucius.
- Zhufu Yan (主父偃)
  - Zhufu Yan (主父偃), 28 parts. Classified into the School of Diplomacy.
- Zi Wan (子晚)
  - Zi Wanzi (子晚子), 35 parts Classified into the School of Syncretists.
- Zi Wei (子韋)
  - Zi Wei (子韋), 3 parts. Classified into the School of Naturalists.
- Zou Shi (騶奭)
  - Shizhong (始終) . Classified into the School of Naturalists.
  - Zou Shizi (鄒奭子), 12 parts. Classified into the School of Naturalists.
- Zou Yan (鄒衍)
  - Zouzi (鄒子), 49 parts. Classified into the School of Naturalists.
  - Zouzi Zhongshen (鄒子終始) ("Zou’s Ends and Beginnings"), 56 parts. Classified into the School of Naturalists.
- Zou Yang (鄒陽)
  - Zou Yang (鄒陽), 7 parts. Classified into the School of Diplomacy.
- Zuo Qiuming (左丘明)
  - Chunqiu Zuo Shi Wei (春秋左氏微) ("Zuo’s Subtle Explanations of the Spring and Autumn"), 2 parts.

==== Unknown authors ====
- Bai Jia (百家) ("Hundred Schools"), 139 volumes. Classified into the School of Minor Tales.
- Bati Liuji (八體六技) ("Eight Scripts and Six Skills").
- Biezi (别字) ("Variant Characters"), 13 parts.
- Boxiang Xiansheng (伯象先生) ("Elder Boxiang"), 1 part. Classified into the School of Syncretists.
- Cangjie Zhuan (蒼頡傳) ("Commentary on Cangjie"), 1 part.
- Chen Peng (臣彭), 4 parts. Classified into the School of Confucius.
- Chengqiuzi (乘丘子), 5 parts. Classified into the School of Naturalists.
- Chunqiu Jia Shi Zhuan (春秋夾氏傳) ("Jia’s Commentary on the Spring and Autumn"), 11 volumes. Lost before the 2nd century.
- Chunqiu Zhangshi Wei (春秋張氏微) ("Zhang’s Subtle Explanation on the Spring and Autumn"), 10 parts.
- Chunqiu Zou Shi Zhuan (春秋鄒氏傳) ("Zou’s Commentary on the Spring and Autumn"), 11 volumes.
- Chuzi (楚子), 3 parts. Classified into the School of Taoists.
- Daojia Yan (道家言) ("Taoist Discourses"), 2 parts.
- Dayu (大𢁰), 37 parts. Classified into the School of Syncretists.
- Fajia Yan (法家言) ("Legalist Discourses"), 2 parts.
- Fengchan Fangshuo (封禪方說) ("Methods and Tales of Fengshan"), 18 parts.
- Gongsunzi (宮孫子), 2 parts. Classified into the School of Taoists.
- Gongyi (功議) ("Discussions on Merit"), 4 parts. Classified into the School of Confucius.
- Gu Fengchan Qunsi (古封禪羣祀) ("Ancient Fengshan and Group Sacrifices"), 22 parts. Classified into the Art of Rites.
- Gu Wuzi (古五子) ("Five Ancient Masters"), 18 parts. Related to Yijing.
- Gu Za (古雜) ("Ancient Miscellany"), 80 parts. Related to Yijing.
- Guicang (歸藏) ("Return to the Hidden"), 12 volumes. Discovered in 281. Lost in the 12th century.
- Guoshizi (國筮子), 17 parts. Classified into the School of Diplomacy.
- Han Danianji (漢大年紀) ("Great Annals of Han"), 5 parts.
- Han Fengchan Qunsi (漢封禪羣祀) ("Fengshan and Group Sacrifices in Han"), 36 parts. Classified into the Art of Rites.
- Han Zhuji (漢著記) ("Records of Han"), 190 volumes.
- Hejian Zhouzhi (河閒周制) ("Zhou Institutions in Hejian"), 18 parts. Classified into the School of Confucius.
- Huangdi Junchen (黃帝君臣) ("Yellow Emperor’s Ministers"), 10 parts. Classified into the School of Taoists.
- Huangdi Ming (黃帝銘) ("Yellow Emperor’s Inscriptions"), 6 parts. Classified into the School of Taoists.
- Huangdi Shuo (黃帝說) ("Explanations on the Yellow Emperor"), 40 parts.
- Huangdi Sijing (黃帝四經) ("Yellow Emperor’s Four Classics"), 4 parts. Classified into the School of Taoists.
- Huangdi Taisu (黃帝泰素) ("Yellow Emperor’s Great Basis"), 20 parts.
- Jiangjuzi (將鉅子), 5 parts. Classified into the School of Naturalists.
- Jiezi Boushu (解子簿書) ("Jie’s Records"), 35 parts. Classified into the School of Syncretists.
- Jingzi (景子), 3 parts. Classified into the School of Confucius.
- Original version of Jizhong Jinian (汲冢紀年) ("Annuals from the Ji Tomb"), 12 volumes. Discovered in 281. Lost in the 9th century.
- Jizhong Suoyu (汲冢瑣語) ("Miscellaneous Notes from the Ji Tomb"), 11 parts. Discovered in 281. Lost in the 12th century.
- Kongzi Turen Tu Fa (孔子徒人圖法) ("Illustrated Rules of Confucius’ Disciples"), 2 volumes. Related to Lunyu.
- Lanyan (讕言) ("Discourses"), 10 parts. Classified into the School of Confucius.
- Laochengzi (老成子), 18 parts. Classified into the School of Taoists.
- Laozi Fushi Jingshuo (老子傅氏經說) ("Fu’s Explanations on Laozi"), 37 parts.
- Laozi Linshi Jingzhuan (老子鄰氏經傳) ("Neighbor’s Commentary on Laozi"), 4 parts.
- Lost 45 volumes of Li Gujing (禮古經) ("Old Classic of Rites").
- Li Shi Chunqiu (李氏春秋) ("Li’s Spring and Autumn"), 2 parts. Classified into the School of Confucius.
- Limu (力牧), 22 parts. Classified into the School of Taoists.
- Lu Lunyu Xiahou Shuo (魯論語夏侯說) ("Xiahou’s Explanations on Lu Analects"), 21 parts.
- Lu Lunyu Zhuan (魯論語傳) ("Commentary on Qi Analects"), 19 parts.
- The Hejian (河間) version of Lunyu (論語) ("Analects"), 9 volumes.
- Mingtang Yinyang (明堂陰陽) ("Yin-Yang of the Bright Hall"), 33 parts. Classified into the Art of Rites.
- Mingtang Yinyang Shuo (明堂陰陽説) ("Explanations on the Yin-Yang of the Bright Hall"), 5 parts. Classified into the Art of Rites.
- Nangong (南公), 31 parts. Classified into the School of Naturalists.
- Neiye (內業) ("Inner Work"), 15 parts. Classified into the School of Confucius.
- Qi Lunyu Shuo (齊論語说) ("Explanations on Qi Analects"), 29 parts.
- Qi Shi Sunshi Gu (齊詩孫氏故) ("Sun’s Character Explanations on Qi Poetry"), 27 volumes.
- Qi Shi Sunshi Zhuan (齊詩孫氏傳) ("Sun’s Commentary on Qi Poetry"), 28 volumes.
- Qi Shi Zaji (齊詩雜記) ("Miscellaneous Records of Qi Poetry"), 18 volumes.
- Qingshizi (青史子), 57 parts. Classified into the School of Minor Talks.
- Quezi (闕子), 1 part. Classified into the School of Diplomacy.
- Rujia Yan (儒家言) ("Confucian Discourses"), 18 parts.
- Shennong (神農), 20 parts. Classified into the School of Agriculturists.
- Shenshu (神輸) ("Divine Conveyance"), 5 parts. Related to Yijing.
- Shi Kuang (師曠), 6 parts. Classified into the School of Minor Talks.
- Shiben (世本) ("Genealogies"), 15 parts.
- Shizhou Pian (史籀篇) ("Shizhou Primer"), 15 parts.
- Sizi (俟子), 1 part. Classified into the School of Confucius.
- Sunzi (孫子), 16 parts. Classified into the School of Taoists.
- Taigu Yilai Nianji (太古以來年紀) ("Annals from the Great Antiquity"), 2 parts.
- Tianyi (天乙), 3 parts. Classified into the School of Minor Talks.
- Tui Za Shu (推雜書) ("Miscellaneous Inferences"), 87 parts. Classified into the School of Syncretists.
- Wang Shi (王氏), 6 parts. Classified into the School of Agriculturists.
- Wangdizi (王狄子), 1 part. Classified into the School of Taoists.
- Wangsunzi (王孫子), 1 part. Classified into the School of Confucius.
- Wei Houguan (衞侯官) ("Houguan in Wei"), 12 parts.
- Wozi (我子) ("Wozi"), 1 part. Classified into the School of Mohists.
- Wucao Guanzhi (五曹官制) ("Five Departments’ Official System"), 5 parts.
- Wuchengzi (務成子), 11 parts. Classified into the School of Minor Talks.
- Wuzi (吳子) ("Wuzi"), 1 part. Classified into the School of Syncretists.
- Xiaojing Gujin Zi (孝經古今字) ("Ancient and Modern Characters on the Classic of Filial Piety"), 1 volume.
- Xiaojing Shuo (孝經說) ("Explanations on the Classic of Filial Piety"), 3 parts.
- Xiaojing Zazhuan (孝經雜傳) ("Miscellaneous Commentaries on the Classic of Filial Piety"), 4 parts.
- Xiaojing Zhangsun Jiangshi Shuo (孝經長孫氏說) ("Zhangsun’s Explanations on the Classic of Filial Piety"), 2 parts.
- Yage Shi (雅歌詩) ("Elegant Songs"), 4 parts. Classified into the Art of Music.
- Yan Lunyu Zhuanshuo (燕論語傳說) ("Commentative Explanations on Yan Analects"), 3 volumes.
- Yan Shishi (燕十事) ("Ten Matters of Yan"), 10 parts. Classified into the School of Legalists.
- Yelao (野老) ("Old Rustic"), 17 parts. Classified into the School of Agriculturists.
- Yi Yin Shuo (伊尹說) ("Explanations of Yi Yin"), 27 parts. Classified into the School of Minor Tales.
- Yin Duwei (尹都尉) ("Commandant Yin"), 14 parts. Classified into the School of Agriculturists.
- You Dizi (游棣子), 1 part. Classified into the School of Legalists.
- Yuzi Shuo (鬻子說) ("Explanations of Yuzi"), 19 parts. Classified into the School of Minor Tales.
- Za Huangdi (雜黃帝) ("Miscellaneous Yellow Emperor"), 58 parts. Classified into the School of Taoists.
- Za Yinyang (雜陰陽) ("Miscellaneous Yin-Yang"), 38 parts.
- Za Zaiyi (雜灾異) ("Miscellaneous Disasters and Anomalies"), 35 parts. Related to Yijing.
- Zaishi (宰氏), 17 parts. Classified into the School of Agriculturists.
- Zajia Yan (雜家言) ("Discourses of the School of Syncretists"), 1 part.
- Zhao Shi (趙氏), 5 parts. Classified into the School of Agriculturists.
- Zheng Zhangzhe (鄭長者) ("Elder in Zheng"), 1 part. Classified into the School of Taoists.
- Zhongyong Shuo (中庸説) ("Doctrine of the Mean"), 2 parts. Classified into the Art of Rites.
- Zhou Fa (周法) ("Zhou Laws"), 9 parts. Classified into the School of Confucius.
- Zhou Kao (周考) ("Zhou Investigations"), 76 parts.
- Zhou Shi Liutao (周史六弢) ("Six Strategies of Zhou Historian"), 6 parts. Classified into the School of Confucius.
- Zhou Xun (周訓) ("Zhou Instructions"), 14 parts. Classified into the School of Taoists.
- Zhou Zheng (周政) ("Zhou Governance"), 6 parts. Classified into the School of Confucius.
- Zhouguan Zhuan (周官傳) ("Commentary on Zhou Offices"), 4 parts. Classified into the Art of Rites.
- Zoushi (奏事) ("Memorials"), 20 parts.

=== Ancient Japanese texts ===
- Tennōki
- Kokki

=== Ancient Indian texts ===
- At least seven of nine total recensions of the Atharvaveda. Only the Śaunakīya and Paippalāda recensions remain.
- Jaya and Bharata, early versions of the Hindu epic Mahabharata
- Bārhaspatya-sūtras, the foundational text of the Cārvāka school of philosophy. The text probably dates from the final centuries BC, with only fragmentary quotations of it surviving.
- Valayapathi, Tamil epic poem, only fragments survive.
- Kundalakesi, Tamil epic poem, only fragments survive.
- Brihatkatha, a collection of stories in Paishachi composed by Gunadhya between the 1st c. BC and the 3rd c. AD. Parts of it were adapted into Sanskrit and some vernaculars (see main article).

=== Ancient Egyptian texts ===
- The Book of Thoth, a legendary manuscript alluded to in Egyptian literature believed to contain the secrets to comprehend the power of the gods and speech of animals.
- Additionally, thousands of other pieces are attributed to the deity Thoth. Seleuces noted that the number of his writings was 20,000 while Manetho held it was 36,525.

=== Avestan texts ===
- Avesta, the holy book of Zoroaster. After Alexander's conquest, avesta was fragmented and it has been said only a third of it survived orally.
- Avesta recollected in 21 volumes, in Sasanian era, only a quarter of which survive.

=== Gnostic texts ===
- The Seventh Universe of the Prophet Hieralias, an unknown manuscript showing up by name inside the Gnostic piece On the Origin of the World.

=== Pahlavi / Middle-Persian texts ===
- Khwātay-Nāmag (Book of Lords) : A chronological history of Iranian kings from the mythical era to the end of Sasanian period. This book was an important reference for post-Sasanian and Islamic historians such as Ibn al-Muqaffa' as well as Ferdowsi in his epic work Shahnameh.
- Ewen-Nāmag: Multi-volume book on Iranian ceremonies, entertainment, warfare, politics, precepts, principles and examples in the Sasanian era.
- Zij-i Shahryār: An important work of astronomy.
- Karirak ud Damanak: A version translated into Pahlavi of the Indian work of fiction Pancatantra.
- Hazār Afsān or Thousand Tales: A Pahlavi compilation of Iranian and Indian tales. This work was translated to Arabic in the Islamic era and became known as One Thousand and One Nights.
- Mazdak-Nāmag: Biography of Mazdak, the Zoroastrian reformer and the primate of Mazdakism movement.
- Kārvand: A book of rhetoric.
- Jāvidan Khrad (Immortal wisdom): Quotations of the mythical Iranian king and sage Hushang.
- Scientific Works of Gondishapur Academy: Works of Greek, Indian, and Persian scholars of the Academy of Gondishapur on medicine, astrology, and philosophy. A remarkable part of their heritage was translated into Arabic during the Graeco-Arabic translation movement.

The Middle-Persian literature had a remarkable diversity based on historical accounts. Only a poor part of mostly religious texts survived by Zoroastrian minorities in Persia and India.

==== Manichaean texts ====
- Ardahang (Arzhang): The holy pictured book of Manichaeism.
- Shabuhragan: The holy book of Mani dedicated to Shapur the Great; only fragments survive.

=== Lost Biblical texts ===
- Hexapla: a compilation of the Old Testament by Origen.
- Mekhilta of Rabbi Shimon ben Yochai

==== Lost texts referenced in the Old Testament ====
- The book referred to at Exodus 17:14. Write this for a memorial in the book and recount it in the hearing of Joshua ...
- The Book of the Covenant referred to at Exodus 24:7
- The Book of the Wars of the Lord (Numbers 21:14)
- Book of Jasher
- Manner of the Kingdom
- Acts of Solomon
- Chronicles of the Kings of Israel
- Chronicles of the Kings of Judah
- Book of the Kings of Israel
- Annals of King David
- Book of Samuel the Seer
- Book of Nathan the Prophet
- Book of Gad the Seer
- History of Nathan the Prophet
- Prophecy of Ahijah
- Visions of Iddo the Seer
- Book of Shemaiah the Prophet
- Iddo Genealogies
- Story of the Prophet Iddo
- Book of the Kings of Judah and Israel
- Book of Jehu
- Story of the Book of Kings
- Acts of Uzziah
- Acts of the Kings of Israel
- Sayings of the Seers
- Laments for Josiah
- Chronicles of King Ahasuerus
- Chronicles of the Kings of Media and Persia

==== Lost works referenced in Deutero-canonical texts ====
- The five volume account of the Maccabean revolt compiled by Jason of Cyrene, abridged by the writer of 2 Maccabees

==== Lost works referenced in the New Testament ====
- Epistle to Corinth
- Epistle from Laodicea to the Colossians

==== Lost works referenced in the Talmud ====
- Book of Ben Tagla
- Book of Ben La'ana
- Book of Eleazar ben Irai
- Pinax of Balaam
- Sefer Aggadta de-Vei Rav
- Megillat Setarim

==== Lost works pertaining to Jesus ====
(These works are generally 2nd century and later; some would be considered reflective of proto-orthodox Christianity, and others would be heterodox.)

- Gospel of Eve
- Gospel of Mani
- Gospel of Matthias
- Gospel of Perfection
- Gospel of the Four Heavenly Realms
- Gospel of the Hebrews
- Gospel of the Seventy
- Gospel of the Twelve
- Memoria Apostolorum
- Secret Gospel of Mark

== Middle Ages (500–1500) ==
=== 6th century ===
- Cassiodorus's Gothic History, which survives only in a much shorter abridgement, the Getica of Jordanes

=== 7th century ===
- The Kakinomoto no Ason Hitomaro Kashū is lost as a standalone work, although an unknown portion of it was preserved as part of the later Man'yōshū.

=== 8th century ===
- The Life of God's Messenger by Ibn Ishaq, although Ibn Hisham published a further revised version of the book, under the same title.
- The Jingxingji ('Records of Travels') by Du Huan; only a few fragments survived in volumes 192 and 193 of the Tongdian encyclopedia.

=== Anglo-Saxon works ===
- The Battle of Maldon, a heroic poem of which only 325 lines in the middle survive.
- Waldere, an epic which is now lost apart from two short fragments.
- The Finnesburg Fragment, comprising 50 lines from an otherwise lost poem.
- Bede's translation of John's Gospel, c. 735.
- Beowulf: since a fire in 1731 parts of the manuscript have been lost, most notably a large section of the fight between Beowulf and the dragon towards the end of the poem. (c. 1000)

=== Talmudic Works ===
- Devarim Zutta, rabbinical commentary to Deuteronomy
- Midrash Abkir
- Midrash Esfah
- Mekhilta le-Sefer Devarim
- Sifri Zutta (Bemidbar)
- Sifri Zutta (Devarim)
- Pirke Rabbi Yose ben Hepetha
- Midrash "Harninu"
- Midrash "Vaykhulu"
- Mishnat 49 Middot
- Sefer Yuhasin
- Sefer Gezerot
- Megillat Semamanin

=== 9th century ===
- Sefer ha-Arukh of Zemah ben Paltoi

=== 10th Century ===
- Sefer haMitzvot of Hafetz Gaon
- Sefer Metivot

=== 11th Century ===
- Alpha-Beta of Machir ben Judah
- Book of Meat over Coals

=== 12th century ===
- Three works by Gerald of Wales:
  - Vita sancti Karadoci ("Life of St Caradoc")
  - De fidei fructu fideique defectu
  - Cambriae mappa
- A romance on the subject of King Mark and Iseult by Chrétien de Troyes.
- The Old French romances André de France and Gui d'Excideuil
- Hryggjarstykki, a Norse saga about almost contemporary Norwegian kings written around 1140.
- Skjöldunga saga, a Norse saga on the legendary Danish dynasty of the Skjöldungs, composed c. 1180–1200
- Gauks saga Trandilssonar, a lost saga of the Icelanders.
- Life of Despot Stefan Lazarević is a work first written in 1166 but the only surviving chronicle is from 1431 by Constantine of Kostenets who includes a genealogy of the Nemanjić dynasty up until Despot Stefan Lazarević.
- William of Tyre's Gesta orientalium principum, a history of the Islamic world
- Gan Bosem of Judah ben Samuel of Regensburg

=== 13th century ===
- The Quaternuli by David of Dinant. They were condemned by a provincial council headed by Peter of Corbeil in 1210, who ordered for them to be burned for expressing pantheist beliefs. David may have also published another work, entitled De Tomis, seu Divisionibus; this may be another title for the Quaternuli.
- The literary tradition of the Nizari Ismailis ("Assassins"), partially destroyed during the reign of Hassan III of Alamut, and eventually lost completely during the Mongol campaign against the Nizaris, in particular during the burning of the Library of Alamut Castle
  - Sargudhasht-i Bābā Sayyidinā (Persian: سرگذشت بابا سیدنا), Hasan-i Sabbah's biography. Juvayni "saved" it before burning the library, and used it as a source in his Tarikh-i Jahangushay, but he claimed that he burned it after reading it.
- Sefer ha-Menahel of Isaac of Ourville
- Divrei haYamim of Isaac ben Samuel of Acre

=== 14th century ===
- Inventio Fortunata. A 14th-century description of the geography of the North Pole.
- Itinerarium. A geography book by Jacobus Cnoyen of 's-Hertogenbosch, cited by Gerardus Mercator
- Res gestae Arturi britanni (The Deeds of Arthur of Britain). A book cited by Jacobus Cnoyen
- Of the Wreched Engendrynge of Mankynde, Origenes upon the Maudeleyne, and The book of the Leoun. Three works by Geoffrey Chaucer.
- The Coventry Mystery Plays, a cycle of which only two plays survive.
- Carostavnik or Rodoslov. Old Serbian biography enters a new—historiographic or even chronographic—phase with the appearance of the so-called Vita, better yet "Lives of Serbian Kings and Archbishops" by Danilo II, Serbian Archbishop, formerly Abbot of the Hilandar Monastery, and his successors, most of whom remained anonymous.
- Vrhobreznica Chronicle originates in 1371 but the work is not transcribed until two and half centuries later by a writer named Gavrilo, a hermit, who collected earlier annals in his redaction composed in 1650 at the Vrhobreznica monastery. Part of a manuscript archived as "Prague Museum #29" (together with Vrhobreznica Genealogy).
- Koporin Chronicle – a 1371 chronicle transcribed in 1453 by Damjan, a deacon, who also wrote the annals on the order of Archbishop of Zeta, Josif, at the Koporin monastery.
- Studenica Chronicle – a 14th century chronicle from 1350–1400. Oldest survived copy in a 16th-century manuscript, together with a younger annals.
- Cetinje Chronicle covers events from 14th century until the end of 16th century, though the manuscript collection is from the end of the 16th century.
- Sefer Asuppot, lost liturgical work mentioned by Jacob ben Asher, Moses of Zurich, and Samuel ben Aaron Schlettstadt

=== 15th century ===
- Yongle Encyclopedia (永乐大典; 永樂大典; Yǒnglè Dàdiǎn; 'The Great Canon [or Vast Documents] of the Yongle Era'). It was one of the world's earliest, and the then-largest, encyclopaedia commissioned by the Yongle Emperor of China's Ming dynasty in 1403, completed about 1408. About 400 volumes (less than 4%) of a 16th-century manuscript set survive today.
- François Villon's poem "The Romance of the Devil's Fart."

== Modern age (1500–present) ==
=== 16th century ===
- Nigramansir. A Moral Interlude and a Pithy. by John Skelton. Printed 1504. A copy seen in 1759 in Chichester has since vanished.
- Ur-Hamlet. An earlier version of the William Shakespeare play Hamlet. Some scholars believe it to be a lost work written by Thomas Kyd, while others attribute it to Shakespeare, identifying the Ur-Hamlet with the first quarto text.
- Love's Labour's Won, play by William Shakespeare.
- The Ocean’s Love to Cynthia. A poem by Sir Walter Raleigh of which only fragments are known.
- Luís de Camões's philosophical work The Parnasum of Luís Vaz is lost.
- The Isle of Dogs (1597), a play by Thomas Nashe and Ben Jonson.
- Phaethon, a play by Thomas Dekker, mentioned in Philip Henslowe's diary, 1597.
- Hot Anger Soon Cold a play by Henry Chettle, Henry Porter and Ben Jonson; mentioned in Henslowe's diary, August 1598.
- The Stepmother's Tragedy, a play by Henry Chettle and Thomas Dekker; mentioned in Henslowe's diary, August 1599.
- Black Bateman of the North, Part II, a play by Henry Chettle and Robert Wilson; mentioned in Henslowe's diary in April 1598.
- Only four Maya codices survived the Spanish conquest; most were destroyed by conquistadors, the Roman Catholic Church or the Aztecs.

=== 17th century ===
- The History of Cardenio, play by William Shakespeare and John Fletcher (1613)
- Keep the Widow Waking, play by John Ford and John Webster (1624)
- Claudio Monteverdi composed at least eighteen operas, but only three (L'Orfeo, L'incoronazione di Poppea, and Il ritorno d'Ulisse in patria) and the famous aria, "Lamento", from his second opera L'Arianna have survived.
- Lost haiku of Ihara Saikaku.
- Jean Racine's first play, Amasie (1660) is lost. In addition, his biography of Louis XIV, Vie de Louis XIV, was destroyed in the fire at Valincour's house.
- John Milton wrote nearly two acts of a tragedy called Adam Unparadiz'd, which was then lost.
- Lost works of Molière:
  - A translation of De Rerum Natura by Lucretius.
  - Le Docteur amoureux (play, 1658)
  - Gros-René, petit enfant (play, 1659)
  - Le Docteur Pédant (play, 1660)
  - Les Trois Docteurs (play, ca. 1660)
  - Gorgibus dans le sac (play, 1661)
  - Le Fagotier (play, 1661)
  - Le Fin Lourdaut (play attributed, 1668)
- Lost works of Dubhaltach Mac Fhirbhisigh include;
  - Ughdair Ereann. Fragments survive
- Works by Buhurizade Mustafa Itri, a major Ottoman musician, composer, singer and poet, who is known to have composed more than a thousand works, only forty of which survive to the present.
- Olympica, René Descartes's youthful account of dreams and their interpretations, was last excerpted by Leibniz in 1675. L'Art de l'escrime by Descartes, a book about fencing, was also lost.
- De non existentia Dei by Kazimierz Łyszczyński, an atheist philosophical treatise, destroyed after the trial and execution of Łyszczyński (1689). Fragments survived in court records.

=== 18th century ===
- All poems and literary works by Carlo Gimach, except for the cantata Applauso Genetliaco, are believed to be lost.
- Lady Mary Wortley Montagu's journal was burned by her daughter on the grounds that it contained too much scandal and satire.
- Edward Gibbon burned the manuscript of his History of the Liberty of the Swiss.
- Adam Smith had most of his manuscripts destroyed shortly before his death. In his last years he had been working on two major treatises, one on the theory and history of law and one on the sciences and arts. The posthumously published Essays on Philosophical Subjects (1795) probably contain parts of what would have been the latter treatise.
- The Green-Room Squabble or a Battle Royal between the Queen of Babylon and the Daughter of Darius, a 1756 play by Samuel Foote, is lost.
- Lehem menahem, a Talmudic work by Menahem Mendel ben Zvi Hirsch of Węgrów. Two pages are preserved at the back of one copy of his Tzintzenet menahem (1720), and the frontispiece of this latter work describes it briefly.
- Numerous works by J. S. Bach, notably at least two large-scale Passions and many cantatas (see List of Bach cantatas) are lost.
- Mozart's Cello Concerto in F and Trumpet Concerto are lost.
- Beethoven's 1793 'Ode to Joy', which was later incorporated into his ninth Symphony
- Haydn's "Double Bass Concerto", of which only the first two measures survive; the rest were burned and destroyed. Supposedly a copy of it may exist somewhere, according to many different speculations.
- Personal letters between George Washington and his wife Martha Washington; all but three were destroyed by Mrs. Washington after his death in 1799.
- Georg Philipp Telemann: his all-encompassing oeuvre comprises more than 3,000 compositions, half of which have been lost.

=== 19th century ===
- Der Vampir (1801) by Ignaz Ferdinand Arnold. Possibly the first vampire novel ever written. There are several references to it in catalogues and biographies, but a real copy has yet to be found.
- The Philosophy of Jesus of Nazareth by Thomas Jefferson, a compilation of the teachings of Jesus extracted from a copy of the King James Bible and bound in 1804; no copies are known to survive since the book was lost in 1858.
- Aaron Burr's farewell address to the U.S. Senate in 1805 has been lost, though the general outlines are known through contemporaneous comments.
- The Memoirs of Lord Byron, destroyed by his literary executors led by John Murray on 17 May 1824. The decision to destroy Byron's manuscript journals, which was opposed only by Thomas Moore, was made in order to protect his reputation. The two volumes of memoirs were dismembered and burned in the fireplace at Murray's office.
- The Scented Garden by Sir Richard Francis Burton, a manuscript of a new translation from Arabic of The Perfumed Garden, was burned by his widow, Lady Isabel Burton née Arundel, along with other papers.
- A large number of manuscripts and longer poems by William Blake were burned soon after his death by Frederick Tatham.
- Parts two and three of Dead Souls by Nikolai Gogol, burned by Gogol at the instigation of the priest Father Matthew Konstantinovskii.
- At least four complete volumes and around seven pages of text are missing from Lewis Carroll's thirteen diaries, destroyed by his family for reasons frequently debated.
- The son of the Marquis de Sade had all of de Sade's unpublished manuscripts burned after de Sade's death in 1814; this included the immense multi-volume work Les Journées de Florbelle.
- A large section of the manuscript for Mary Shelley's Lodore was lost in the mail to the publisher, and Shelley was forced to rewrite it.
- Gerard Manley Hopkins burned all his early poetry on entering the priesthood.
- In the Suspiria de Profundis of Thomas De Quincey, 18 of 32 pieces have not survived.
- Alexander Ivanovich Galich's completed manuscripts Universal Rights and Philosophy of Human History were destroyed in a fire, an event the grieved Galich did not long survive.
- Margaret Fuller's manuscript on the history of the 1849 Roman Republic was lost in the 1850 shipwreck in which Fuller herself, her husband and her child perished. In Fuller's own estimation, as well as of others who saw it, this work, based on her first-hand experience in Rome, might have been her most important work.
- A schoolmate of Arthur Rimbaud claimed that he lost a notebook of poems Rimbaud had written, dubbed the "Cahier Labarrière", which reportedly contained about 60 poems. If this were true, and if all were distinct from Rimbaud's known verse poems, these lost poems would equal the extant works in volume. Paul Verlaine also mentioned a text called "La Chasse spirituelle", claiming it to be Rimbaud's masterpiece. It was also never found; a forgery was published in 1949.
- The first draft of Thomas Carlyle's The French Revolution: A History was sent to John Stuart Mill, whose maid mistakenly burned it, forcing Carlyle to rewrite it from scratch.
- Joseph Smith's Book of Lehi from the Mormon Golden Plates was either hidden, destroyed, or modified by Lucy Harris, the wife of transcriber Martin Harris. Whatever their fate, the pages were not returned to Joseph Smith and were declared "lost." Smith did not recreate the translation.
- Isle of the Cross, Herman Melville's follow-up to the unsuccessful Pierre was rejected by his publishers and has subsequently been lost.
- Robert Louis Stevenson burned his first completed draft of Strange Case of Dr Jekyll and Mr Hyde after his wife criticized the work. Stevenson wrote and published a revised version.
- Abraham Lincoln's Lost Speech, given on May 29, 1856, in Bloomington, Illinois. Traditionally regarded as lost because it was so engaging that reporters neglected to take notes, the speech is believed to have been an impassioned condemnation of slavery.
- L. Frank Baum's theatre in Richburg, New York, burned to the ground. Among the manuscripts of Baum's original plays known to have been lost are The Mackrummins, Matches (which was being performed the night of the fire), The Queen of Killarney, Kilmourne, or O'Connor's Dream, and the complete musical score for The Maid of Arran, which survives only in commercial song sheets, which include six of the eight songs and no instrumental music.
- Leon Trotsky describes the loss of an unfinished play manuscript (a collaboration with Sokolovsky) in his My Life, end of chapter 6 (sometime between 1896 and 1898).
- The Poor Man and the Lady. Thomas Hardy's first novel (1867) was never published. After rejection by several publishers, he destroyed the manuscript.
- George Gissing abandoned many novels and destroyed the incomplete manuscripts. He also completed at least three novels which went unpublished and have been lost.
- During the many years of his career, Mark Twain produced a vast number of pieces, of which a considerable part, especially in his earlier years, was published in obscure newspapers under a great variety of pen names, or not published at all. Joe Goodman, who had been Twain's editor when he worked at the Virginia City, Nevada, "Territorial Enterprise", declared in 1900 that Twain wrote some of the best material of his life during his "Western years" in the late 1860s, but most of it was lost. In addition, many of Twain's speeches and lectures have been lost or were never written down. Researchers continue to seek this material, some of which was rediscovered as recently as 1995.
- Although frequently referenced in the Oxford English Dictionary and traceable in several catalogues of libraries and booksellers, no copy of the 1852 book Meanderings of Memory by Nightlark could be tracked down.
- The Reverend Francis Kilvert's diaries were edited and censored, possibly by his widow, after his death in 1879. In the 1930s, the surviving diaries were passed on to William Plomer, who transcribed them, before returning the originals to Kilvert's closest living relative, a niece, who destroyed most of the manuscripts. Plomer's own transcription was destroyed in the Blitz. He only learned of the originals' destruction when he planned to publish a complete edition in the 1950s.
- Jean Sibelius's Karelia Music was destroyed after its premiere in 1893. What survives today fully are the Karelia Overture and the Karelia Suite. Most of the music was reconstructed in 1965 by Kalevi Kuosa, from the original parts that had survived. The parts that hadn't survived were those of the violas, cellos, and double basses. Based on Kuosa's transcription, the Finnish composers Kalevi Aho and Jouni Kaipainen have individually reconstructed the complete music to Karelia Music.
- The musical score to Gilbert and Sullivan’s 1871 opera Thespis has been mostly lost with only 3 musical passages being known to survive.
- Nathaniel Hawthorne's Seven Tales of my Native Land was personally destroyed after being rejected by publishers.
- Many of the early works of Richard Wagner have been lost.
- After 1890, after his creative ability declined, Henri Duparc destroyed his works, manuscripts, and correspondence. He died in 1933 at the age of 85.

=== 20th century ===
- James Joyce's play A Brilliant Career (which he burned) and the first half of his novel Stephen Hero. His grandson Stephen later burned Nora Barnacle's letters to James as well.
- J. Meade Falkner left an almost complete fourth and last novel on a train and felt he was too old to start again.
- A number of Scott Joplin's compositions have been lost, including his first opera, A Guest of Honor.
- John P. Marquand wrote an early novel called Yellow Ivory in collaboration with his friend W. A. Macdonald.
- Various parts of Daniel Paul Schreber's "Memoirs of My Nervous Illness" (original German title "Denkwürdigkeiten eines Nervenkranken") (1903) were destroyed by his wife and a Doctor Flesching for protecting his reputation, which was mentioned by Sigmund Freud as highly important in his essay "The Schreber Case" (1911).
- L. Frank Baum wrote four novels for adults that were never published and disappeared: Our Married Life and Johnson (1912), The Mystery of Bonita (1914), and Molly Oodle (1915). Baum's son claimed that Baum's wife burned these, but this was after being cut out of her will. Evidence that Baum's publisher received these manuscripts survives. Also lost are Baum's 1904 short stories "Mr. Rumple's Chill" and "Bess of the Movies", as well as his early plays Kilmourne, or O'Connor's Dream (opened April 4, 1883) and The Queen of Killarney (1883).
- In 1907, August Strindberg destroyed a play, The Bleeding Hand, immediately after writing it. He was in a bad mood at the time and commented in a letter that the piece was unusually harsh, even for him.
- "Text I" of Seven Pillars of Wisdom, a 250,000-word manuscript by T. E. Lawrence lost at Reading railway station in December 1919.
- In 1922, a suitcase with almost all of Ernest Hemingway's work to date was stolen from a train compartment at the Gare de Lyon in Paris, from his current wife. It included a partial World War I novel.
- The Truth about Father Christmas by Phyllis Twigg, broadcast in the UK on Christmas Eve 1922, was the first radio drama ever produced. Although she later rewrote it as a short story under a pen name, no copies of the original script exist.
- The novels Tobold and Theodor by Robert Walser are lost, possibly destroyed by the author, as is a third, unnamed novel. (1910–1921)
- Jean Sibelius burned his unfinished 8th Symphony and several of his unfinished works in the 1920s.
- The original version of Ultramarine by Malcolm Lowry was stolen from his publisher's car in 1932, and the author had to reconstruct it.
- Franz Kafka's last lover, Dora Diamant, ignored his wishes to have his works destroyed posthumously. Instead she kept some 20 notebooks and 35–36 letters. In 1933, the Gestapo seized all papers in her home, including these notebooks and letters, in their search to find communist propaganda. Only three of these letters have been discovered since. Furthermore, when Max Brod, Kafka's literary executor who similarly ignored his wishes, died in 1968, he left Kafka's papers to his secretary, who left them to her daughters. The papers then passed into the ownership of the National Library of Israel in 2016. After a lengthy legal dispute between the library and the daughters, many of these papers have yet to be published.
- Finis Gloria Mundi, an alleged book by the French alchemist Fulcanelli that followed his two previous titles The Mystery of the Cathedrals and Dwellings of the Philosophers, was supposedly written by him but never published. A book under that name was published in 1999, but it was shown to be a forgery.
- The Will of Prometheus: A Trip to Hell and Beyond (also referred to as Prometheus Unleashed and Orpheus – a Journey to Hell and Beyond), the third book by the German historian and SS officer Otto Rahn (a follow-up to Crusade Against the Grail and Lucifer's Court), was allegedly destroyed by Otto's mother after the war.
- Paramahansa Yogananda's Autobiography of a Yogi quotes extensively from his student's C. Richard Wright's travel diaries in 1935/6. Following Wright's death they became lost.
- In 1938, George Orwell wrote Socialism and War, an "anti-war pamphlet" for which he could not find a publisher. Although many previously unknown letters and other documents relating to Orwell have been discovered in recent years, no trace of this pamphlet has yet come to light. With the beginning of World War II Orwell's views on pacifism were to change radically, so he may well have destroyed the manuscript.
- Lost papers and a possible unfinished novel by Isaac Babel, confiscated by the NKVD, May 1939.
- Manuscript of Efebos, a novel by Karol Szymanowski, destroyed in bombing of Warsaw, 1939.
- Five volumes of poetry and a drama, all in manuscript, by "Saint-John Perse"—actually the pseudonym of French diplomat Alexis Léger—were destroyed at his house outside Paris in the summer of 1940. Perse was a well-known and uncompromising anti-Nazi and his house was raided by German troops. The works had been written during his diplomat years, but "Perse" had decided not to publish any new writing until he had retired from diplomacy. The real Léger went into exile following the Fall of France.
- Walter Benjamin had a completed manuscript in his suitcase when was arrested by the Nazis while attempting to flee France for neutral Spain in the summer of 1940. Benjamin committed suicide in the Pyrenees village Portbou, Spain on September 26, 1940, and the suitcase and its contents disappeared.
- There are reports that Bruno Schulz worked on a novel called The Messiah, but no trace of this manuscript survived his death (1942).
- The diary of Holocaust victim Margot Frank, Anne Frank's older sister, was never found (1944). Of The Diary of Anne Frank, the original volume or volumes covering the period between December 1942 and December 1943 was never found, and assumed to have been taken by the Nazis who raided the hiding place. This period is only known from the version Anne rewrote for preservation, which is known to have been in many ways different from her original.
- The novel In Ballast to the White Sea by Malcolm Lowry, lost in a fire in 1945.
- The novel Wanderers of Night and poems of Daniil Andreev were destroyed in 1947 as "anti-Soviet literature" by the MGB.
- Some pages of William Burroughs's original version of Naked Lunch were stolen.
- Three early, unpublished novels by Philip K. Dick written in the 1950s are no longer extant: A Time for George Stavros, Pilgrim on the Hill, and Nicholas and the Higs.
- In 1958, while working on the last chapter, William H. Gass's novel Omensetter's Luck was stolen off of his desk, forcing him to begin from scratch.
- The manuscript for Sylvia Plath's unfinished second novel, provisionally titled Double Exposure, or Double Take, written 1962–63, disappeared some time before 1970.
- Around 1970, Jilly Cooper accidentally left an original draft of her 1985 novel Riders on a bus in London; the draft was never found, despite a public appeal.
- Venedikt Yerofeyev's novel Dmitry Shostakovich was in a bag with two bottles of fortified wine that was stolen from him in a commuter train in 1972.
- Several pages of the original screenplay for Werner Herzog's Aguirre, der Zorn Gottes were reportedly thrown out of the window of a bus after one of his football teammates vomited on them.
- The screenplay for the proposed Dean Stockwell–Herb Berman film After the Gold Rush is reportedly lost.
- Frederik L. Schodt translated The Rose of Versailles into English for use as reference by the producers of the manga's 1979 live-action film adaptation Lady Oscar; only one copy of the translation was produced, which was lost.
- Diaries of Philip Larkin – burned at his request after his death on 2 December 1985. Other private papers were kept, contrary to his instructions.
- The fourth novel of Sasha Sokolov have been lost when the Greek house where it was written burned down in the second half the 1980s.
- Jacob M. Appel's first novel manuscript, Paste and Cover, was in the trunk of an automobile that was stolen in Providence, Rhode Island, in 1998. The vehicle was recovered, but the manuscript was not.
- Mitzi Myers' four Maria Edgeworth manuscripts in progress at the time – two academic books and two annotated versions of Edgeworth novels – were lost in a house fire on August 13, 2000.

=== 21st century ===
- Terry Pratchett's unfinished works were destroyed in 2017 after his death, fulfilling his last will; his computer hard drive containing his unfinished works was deliberately crushed by a steamroller.

== Lost literary collections ==
- Chinese emperor Qin Shi Huang (3rd century BCE) had most previously existing books burned when he consolidated his power. See Burning of books and burying of scholars.
- The Library of Alexandria, the largest library in existence during antiquity, was destroyed at some point in time between the Roman and Muslim conquests of Alexandria.
- Aztec emperor Itzcoatl (ruled 1427/8–1440) ordered the burning of all historical Aztec codices in an effort to develop a state-sanctioned Aztec history and mythology.
- During the Dissolution of the Monasteries, many monastic libraries were destroyed. Worcester Abbey had 600 books at the time of the dissolution. Only six of them have survived intact to the present day. At the abbey of the Augustinian Friars at York, a library of 646 volumes was destroyed, leaving only three surviving books. Some books were destroyed for their precious bindings, others were sold off by the cartload, including irreplaceable early English works. It is believed that many of the earliest Anglo-Saxon manuscripts were lost at this time.

"A great nombre of them whych purchased those supertycyous mansyons, resrved of those lybrarye bokes, some to serve theyr jakes [i.e., as toilet paper], some to scoure candelstyckes, and some to rubbe their bootes. Some they solde to the grossers and soapsellers ..." — John Bale, 1549

- Many works of Anglo-Saxon literature, mostly unique and unpublished, were burned when a fire broke out in the Cotton library at Ashburnham House on 23 October 1731. However, the only surviving manuscript of Beowulf survived the fire and was printed for the first time in 1815.
- In 1193, the Nalanda University was sacked by Bakhtiyar Khilji. The burning of the library continued for several months and "smoke from the burning manuscripts hung for days like a dark pall over the low hills."
- The sacking of Baghdad by the Mongols.
- At least 27 Maya codices were ceremonially destroyed by Diego de Landa (1524–1579), bishop of Yucatán, on 12 July 1562.
- The library of the Hanlin Academy, containing irreplaceable ancient Chinese manuscripts, was mostly destroyed in 1900 during the Boxer Rebellion.
- The Sikh Reference Library in Amritsar, a collection of rare books, newspapers, manuscripts, and other literary works related to Sikhism and India, was looted and incinerated by Indian troops during the 1984 Operation Blue Star. The missing literature has not been recovered to this day and is presumed to be lost. The library hosted a vast collection of an estimated 20,000 literary works just before the destruction, including 11,107 books, 2,500 manuscripts, newspaper archives, historical letters, documents/files, and others.
- During the 2014 unrest in Bosnia and Herzegovina, sections of the National Archives in Sarajevo were set on fire. Large numbers of historical documents were lost, many of them dating from the 1878–1918 Austro-Hungarian rule in Bosnia and Herzegovina, the interwar period, and the 1941–1945 rule of the Independent State of Croatia. About 15,000 files from the 1996–2003 Human Rights Chamber for Bosnia and Herzegovina were also destroyed.

== Rediscovered works ==
- The 120 Days of Sodom, written by the Marquis de Sade in the Bastille prison in 1785, was considered lost by its author (and was much lamented by him) after the storming and looting of 1789. It was rediscovered in the walls of his cell and published in 1904.
- Lesbian Love, by Eva Kotchever, had only 150 copies published "for private circulation only" in 1925. Historian Jonathan Ned Katz searched and found the only known copy, owned by Nina Alvarez, who had found the book in the lobby of her apartment building in 1998 in Albany, New York. Records show that another copy was held in the Sterling Memorial Library at Yale University, but it has not been located.
- The Gospel of Judas, a fragmentary Coptic codex rediscovered and translated, 2006.
- Henri Poincaré's prize-winning submission for the 1889 celestial mechanics contest of King Oscar II was thought to be lost. While this version was being printed, Poincaré himself discovered a serious error. The existing version was recalled and then replaced by a heavily modified and corrected version, now regarded as the seminal description of chaos theory. The original erroneous submission was thought to be lost, but it was found in 2011.
- W. A. Mozart and Antonio Salieri are known to have composed together a cantata for voice and piano called Per la ricuperata salute di Ofelia which was celebrating the return to stage of the singer Nancy Storace, and which had been lost, although it had been printed by Artaria in 1785. The music had been considered lost until November 2015, when German musicologist and composer Timo Jouko Herrmann identified the score while searching for music by one of Salieri's ostensible pupils, Antonio Casimir Cartellieri, in the archives of the Czech Museum of Music in Prague.
- A Tale of Kitty in Boots by Beatrix Potter, the handwritten manuscripts for this story were found in school notebooks, including a few illustrations. She intended to finish the book, but was interrupted by wars and marriage and farming. It was found nearly 100 years later and published for the first time in September 2016.

== In popular culture ==
- Umberto Eco's The Name of the Rose features a murder mystery whose solution hinges on the contents of Aristotle's lost second book of Poetics (dealing with comedy).
- Dan Brown's The Da Vinci Code builds its central theme around a fictional account of the apocryphal and partially lost Gnostic Gospels.
- Joe Haldeman's science fiction novel The Hemingway Hoax centers on a suitcase with writings by Ernest Hemingway which was stolen in 1922 at the Gare de Lyon in Paris.
- "The Shakespeare Code" is a Doctor Who episode that explains the fate of Love's Labour's Won.
- The Mysteries of Harris Burdick is presented as a series of images ostensibly created by one Harris Burdick, who had intended to use them for his children's books before he mysteriously disappeared. Each image is accompanied by a title and a single line of text, which encourage readers to create their own stories.
- H. P. Lovecraft wrote that all the original Arabic copies of The Necronomicon (Al Azif) have been destroyed, as well as the Arabic to Greek translations. Only five Greek to Latin translations are held by libraries, though copies may exist in private collections.

== See also ==
- List of comics solicited but never published
- List of destroyed heritage
- List of lost films
- List of missing treasures
- List of unpublished books
