= Book of Jehu =

The Book of Jehu is a lost text that may have been written by the Biblical prophet Jehu ben Hanani, who was one of King Baasha's contemporaries. The book is described in 2 Chronicles 20:34: "Now the rest of the acts of Jehoshaphat, first and last, behold, they are written in the book of Jehu the son of Hanani, which is mentioned in the book of the Kings of Israel."

This manuscript is sometimes called Annals of Jehu ben Hanani

== See also ==
- Table of books of Judeo-Christian Scripture
- Lost work
