= Studiosus =

- Author: Pliny the Elder
- Language: Latin
- Subject: Rhetoric
- Genre: Educational manual
- Publication date: c. 67–68 AD
- Publication place: Roman Empire
- Pages: 3 books (6 volumes)

Studiosus (English: The Student) was a three-book, six-volume educational manual on rhetoric written by the Roman author Pliny the Elder. The work is now a lost literary work.

According to his nephew, Pliny the Younger, Studiosus was a comprehensive guide that detailed the training of an orator from early childhood. Pliny the Younger described the work's purpose by stating: "The orator is trained from his very cradle and perfected."

Studiosus may have been an influence on Quintilian's later work, Institutio Oratoria. The structure of that work covers subjects taught throughout an orator's life, from childhood on, in a way that is not seen in other classical works but resembles what we know of Studiosus. Institutio Oratoria refers directly to Studiosus only once:

The ancients used to let the toga fall right down to the heels, like the Greek pallium; and this is recommended by Plotius and Nigidius, who wrote on Gesture at that period. I am therefore all the more surprised at a statement by Pliníus Secundus, a man of real learning and in this book at any rate precise to a fault. He says that Cicero used to wear his toga like this to conceal his varicose veins, although the fashion is to be seen also in statues of persons who lived after Cicero's time.

== Background ==
Pliny wrote Studiosus during the final years of Emperor Nero's reign (c. 67–68 AD). His nephew noted that this was a time when "every kind of literary pursuit which was in the least independent or elevated had been rendered dangerous by servitude." During this period of political peril, Pliny focused his writing on subjects considered "safe," such as grammar and rhetoric, avoiding the more dangerous work of contemporary history. The work was followed by another linguistic text, Dubii sermonis (Of Doubtful Phraseology).

== See also ==
- Pliny the Elder
- Lost literary work
- Rhetoric
- Bella Germaniae
