= Murder at Full Moon =

Unpublished novel by John Steinbeck

Murder at Full Moon is an unpublished novel written by John Steinbeck in 1930. The novel was written under the pseudonym Peter Pym; a bound typescript of it exists at the Harry Ransom Center at the University of Texas at Austin.

The novel has been described in the media as a "werewolf novel," "werewolf mystery" and "werewolf murder mystery." Steinbeck attempted to have it published in 1930, but it was rejected for publication.

Various Steinbeck scholars, in particular professor Gavin Jones of Stanford University, have advocated for the novel to be published, but the Steinbeck estate's literary agency McIntosh and Otis has stated that it would not publish the book, as Steinbeck chose not to publish it during his lifetime.

== Plot ==
Egg Waters is hired as a newspaper reporter in Cone City, California, after receiving a year-long suspension from the university he attends in San Francisco. Soon after arriving, a dog is brutally killed at the local gun club.

After several more murders, Waters teams up with a local candidate for sheriff, Maximillian Sergius Hoogle, to solve the mystery. The killings always occur on a full moon.

At the end of the novel, Hoogle and Waters solve the mystery by determining the owner of the gun club, Mac, goes insane once a month during the full moon.

== Reception ==
While the novel has not been published, various critics and scholars have read the manuscript and commented on it. Robert DeMott called it “a shameless commercial satire of pulp-detective novels." Luchen Li and Jeffrey Schultz called it “a cynical attempt at a standard commercial mystery-thriller."

In the Los Angeles Review of Books, Jess Nevins described it as a "metafictional novel" that was "an exhaustion of the mystery novel formula and an invitation to do something new and unprecedented with it."

== See also ==
- List of unpublished books
