= List of unpublished books =

This is a list of unpublished books by notable people, alphabetized by author. These notable people may be published authors, but not necessarily.

== Unpublished fiction ==
- Charles Alverson: The Word, Caleb and Lost in Austin
- Allen Appel: Sea of Time (1988), unpublished novel in the published Alex Balfour Pastmaster series
- L. Frank Baum: Our Married Life (1912), Johnson (1912), The Mystery of Bonita (1914) and Molly Oodle (1915). Reported in Katherine Rogers' L. Frank Baum: Creator of Oz and Michael Patrick Hearn's The Annotated Wizard of Oz. According to Hearn, although not a published statement, The Mystery of Bonita is mentioned in contracts related to The Oz Film Manufacturing Company. The others are noted on file folders that once contained them and correspondence recovered from the Reilly & Lee offices, but the manuscripts themselves remain lost. The books were intended for adult readers and correspondence for the first of these, Our Married Life, indicates that, unlike his four published adult novels, he did not want these books to appear under a pseudonym. Frank Joslyn Baum's biography of L. Frank, To Please a Child, claims that Maud Gage Baum burned Baum's unpublished manuscripts; however, it is known that much of this biography was falsified after Frank J. and Maud's falling out (including Frank J. being dropped from Maud's will) over the rights to the Oz books.
- Mildred Benson: The Runaway Sea Lion (1964)
- Amy Bishop: three novels, including The Martian Experiment (a.k.a. If Bullets Were Gold) and Amazon Fever
- Richard Brautigan: The God of the Martians
- Harold Brodkey: A Party of Animals, a 2000-page manuscript in 1976 later published in a different form
- Louise Brooks: Naked on My Goat, autobiographical novel
- James Brown: A Fine Madness, a novel which Brown says "never found a publisher"
- Charles Bukowski: The Poet
- Marc Cerasini: Godzilla and the Lost Continent
- Michael Chabon: Fountain City, abandoned after 1,500 pages but then inspired Chabon's Wonder Boys
- John Cheever: The Swimmer, after writing 150 pages of this novel, Cheever reduced it to a 12-page short story
- Michael Cimino: Byzantium, a novel divided into three volumes; "Sailing to Byzantium", "Night's Islands" and "Ghost Dancer"
- Joan Collins: The Ruling Passion and Hell Hath No Fury, both in a legal battle with Random House which Collins won in 1996
- Henry Darger: In the Realms of the Unreal (totaling more than 15,000 pages) and Crazy House: Further Adventures in Chicago (totaling more than 10,000 pages). His History of My Life (began as nonfiction) totals more than 4600 pages.
- Samuel R. Delany: Voyage, Orestes!, massive early mimetic fiction novel, both manuscript copies lost; a small excerpt was found and published in 2019
- Philip K. Dick: A Time for George Stavros and Nicholas and the Higs, both lost manuscripts, and The Owl in Daylight, uncompleted at the time of his death
- Ken Grimwood: untitled sequel to Replay, in progress at the time of his death, and a collaboration with Tom Atwill
- Larry Hama: Eamon Diaz and the Vampire Queen
- Donald Hamilton: The Dominators
- V. T. Hamlin: The Devil's Daughter
- Thomas Hardy: The Poor Man and the Lady, Hardy's first novel (1867); rejected by five publishers and manuscript later destroyed
- L. Ron Hubbard: Excalibur, an earlier version of his Dianetics: The Modern Science of Mental Health
- Geoffrey Jenkins: Per Fine Ounce, a commissioned James Bond novel circa 1966; the copyright holders rejected the novel, claiming that it was "unpublishable"
- Stephen King: The Aftermath (1963 novella), Sword in the Darkness (1970 novel) and The House on Value Street (1974 novel based on the Patty Hearst kidnapping)
- Dean Koontz: Ride the Storm, third in the Moonlight Bay Trilogy
- Jonathan Lethem: Heroes, 125-page novel which he wrote while in high school
- Karl Marx: Scorpion and Felix, an unpublished and now fragmentary comedic novel (1837)
- Hugh MacLennan: So All Their Praises and A Man Should Rejoice
- Marilyn Manson: Holy Wood
- Chuck Palahniuk: Insomnia: If You Lived Here, You'd Be Home Already
- Frederik Pohl: For Some We Loved (1944), about New York advertising agencies; burned by author, who described it as "a long, complicated, and very bad novel"
- J.D. Salinger: He continued writing through the last half-century of his long life, while he lived as a recluse. He is speculated to have one or two unpublished novels and possibly more than fifteen.
- James H. Schmitz: Karres Venture, a lost sequel to Witches of Karres (1968)
- Artie Shaw: The Education of Albie Snow, a semi-autobiographical 1000-page, three-volume work
- C. P. Snow: 1950–51 novel deleted from the Strangers and Brothers series
- Francis Spufford: The Stone Table, an unofficial addition to The Chronicles of Narnia. Arguably a published work, as Spufford has distributed copies to friends.
- John Steinbeck: Murder at Full Moon
- William Styron: The Way of the Warrior, a much-revised World War II novel
- Hunter S. Thompson: Prince Jellyfish
- Kurt Vonnegut: If God Were Alive Today, unfinished novel about a wisecracking lecturer to college students
- Evelyn Waugh: The Temple at Thatch, destroyed by Waugh
- Doodles Weaver: Golden Spike
- Edith Wharton: Literature
- Charles Willeford: Grimhaven, sequel to Miami Blues
- Jerry Yulsman: Gotham, in progress at the time of his death

== Unpublished nonfiction ==
- Robert Aickman: Panacea: The Synthesis of an Attitude, a lengthy philosophical work
- F. Lee Bailey: a memoir about his defense of Patty Hearst
- Calvin Beck: Sense of Wonder, a survey of 1940s fantasy films
- Jack Bradbury: autobiography about working in animation and comic books
- Barry Brown: Unsung Heroes of the Horrors, interview profiles of actors
- Peter Bogdanovich: But What I Really I Want to Do is Direct: My First Picture Shows 1965–1971, a memoir detailing his life and career as a director
- Buff Cobb: Memoirs of a Subdeb in Hollywood
- Lee Duncan: rough draft of an autobiography by the trainer of Rin Tin Tin
- John Howard Griffin: Scattered Shadows, a memoir about the author's blindness
- Napoleon Hill: Outwitting The Devil (1970)
- V. T. Hamlin: The Man Who Walked with Dinosaurs (autobiography) and Four Rivers (fishing memoir)
- JP Miller: A Ship Without a Shore, memoir of Miller's WWII experiences aboard the aircraft carrier USS Cabot
- Fulton Oursler: autobiography in progress at the time of his death
- Theodore Roosevelt: The Winning of the West: Roosevelt's series was originally meant to be at least six books. Due to the death of his first wife, Roosevelt edited the series to conclude at four volumes.
- Kay Sage: China Eggs, a memoir of 1910–35, covering her family, childhood, travels, painting, life in Italy, her marriage to Prince Ranieri di San Faustino and her friendship with Ezra Pound.
- Yvette Vickers: autobiography in progress at the time of her death
- Fredric Wertham: The War on Children

== See also ==
- List of comics solicited but never published
- Lost literary work
- Unfinished creative work
