= Santra (Roman author) =

Santra was an ancient Roman tragic poet and grammarian of whose work little survives. Nonius Marcellus, a 4th or 5th century CE grammarian, preserves two fragments of his play Nuptiae Bacchi, and also two separate passages from his work De Antiquitate Verborum ("On the Antiquity of Words"). The 1st-century CE author Suetonius probably utilized Santra as a source for his work De Viris Illustribus ("On the Illustrious Men"), in which he refers to Santra twice. Suetonius states that Santra commended the work De Lucilio ("On Lucilius") by Nicias of Kos, and that he disputed the rumors that Terence—a 2nd-century BCE comic playwright—had received help in his writings from Scipio and Laelius. Santra seemingly created his own biographical account of important historical figures, for he is explicitly cited as having done so by St Jerome in his own work De Viris Illustribus. Quintilian, a 1st-century CE, also references Santra regarding the topic of the origin of Attic and Asiatic oratory. According to Quintilian, Santra believed that the Asiatic style, which was characterized by exaggerated and emotive speech, developed as ancient non-native speakers of Greek in Asia began to utilize periphrasis to express concepts that they had not yet acquired sufficient command of the language to describe more economically. Martial, a 1st-century Roman poet, describes Santra's literary style as "rugged" ("salebrosum") and refers to his readers as "austere" ("tetrici").

== Writings ==
- De Antiquitate Verborum ("On the Antiquity of Words") — a treatise on grammar, two passages of which are preserved in the writings of Nonius Marcellus.
- Nuptiae Bacchi — two fragments survive, preserved in the writings of Nonius Marcellus.
