= Machir ben Judah =

Machir ben Judah was a French Jewish scholar of the tenth and eleventh centuries, born at Metz, and brother of R. Gershom "the Light of the Exile" (Me'or ha-Golah).

He is known by his dictionary entitled Alfa Beta de-R. Makir, not extant, but quoted often by Rashi, RaSHBaM, Eliezer b. Nathan, Jacob Tam, and other tosafists. As the title indicates, the dictionary was arranged in alphabetical order, and from the many quotations by Rashi in his commentary on the Talmud (Ḥul. 20b; Pes. 50a et passim) it seems that it dealt chiefly with the difficult words and passages of the Talmud; but (by Rashi) he is quoted also for the interpretation of the word boṭnim, in Gen 43:11. Machir adopted for the most part the interpretations of his brother, who was Nathan ben Jehiel's teacher. Still he sometimes differed from his brother in the interpretation of words, and in such cases Nathan often adopted the opinion of Machir (comp. Jacob Tam, Sefer ha-Yashar, p. 58b), though he never quotes him in his 'Aruk.

The quotations from Machir by Rashi and the other rabbis mentioned above were collected by Solomon L. Rapoport in his biography of Nathan b. Jehiel (Bikkure ha-'Ittim, x. 8, xi. 82).
