= Pompilius (author) =

Pompilius was an ancient Roman author of whose work very little survives. One elegiac poem he authored is preserved in a fragment of Varro itself only quoted by Nonius Marcellus. In the poem, which Pompilius probably intended to serve as his epitaph, he claims to have been a pupil of Pacuvius, himself a student of "Ennius of the Muses." According to the classicist Joseph McAlhany, in this poem, Pompilius places himself within a literary "genealogy" extending backwards to Ennius, and in doing so associated himself with the characteristics of ars ("skill") and ingenium ("talent") that Ennius ascribed to himself. Varro preserves in another fragment of an unidentified play composed by Pompilius, within which he writes "alas, for what reason, Fortune, do you crush me in a hostile manner?"
