= Gui d'Excideuil =

Gui d'Excideuil ("Guy of Excideuil") is an Old French romance, written in the 12th century, whose text is now lost. The eponymous hero's lover was a fairy, but he lost her (in an orchard, according to Raimbaut de Vaqueiras) because he began to think about the queen, who loved him unrequitedly. The story is alluded to by other troubadours such as Peire Vidal in Plus que-l paubres que jatz el ric ostal, and was a well-known story of its time.

== See also ==
- André de France
