= Akrisios =

The Akrisios is a tragedy by the 5th-century BCE Athenian playwright Sophocles that survives only in fragments.

== Content ==
Lloyd-Jones identifies three plays written by Sophocles that dealt with the myth of Perseus's birth: the Danae, The Men of Larissa, and the Akrisios. It is possible that the Akrisios and the Danae were in fact identical, as both relate the earlier part of the myth (in which Akrisios, Danae's father, fearing a prophecy that he would be killed coming to pass, casts Perseus onto the sea with his mother Danae). Lloyd-Jones thought it unlikely that Sophocles would have written two plays on the same subject. Jebb, however, is more hesitant in this instance to accept the possibility of alternative titles for the same play, as the evidence for it is not particularly clear, though he does acknowledge the implausibility of Sophocles writing two plays for the same story.

== Date ==
As with all of Sophocles' lost plays, the date of Akrisios is unknown.

== Extant sources ==
Sixteen fragments of Akrisios survive, along with six each attributed to Danae and Men of Larrisa. Sources include, among others Stobaeus' Anthology 3 and 4, Hesychius I p. 375, and Orus Ety. M. p. 69.
