= André de France =

André de France or André de Paris is an Old French romance, written in the 12th century, whose text is now lost. The eponymous hero was in love with a queen, and eventually died of love.

Stroński has listed 22 passages by troubadours that reference the story, including two by Raimbaut de Vaqueiras. It may have been written in the form of a short narrative poem.

== See also ==
- Gui d'Excideuil
