= Book of the Kings of Israel =

The Book of the Kings of Israel is a non-canonical work referred to in the Hebrew Bible (e.g. 1 Chronicles 9:1–2). The Acts of the Kings of Israel (Hebrew: דברי מלכי ישראל, romanized: diḇrê malḵê Yiśrā’êl) is a non-canonical work described in 2 Chronicles 33:18. The passage reads: "Now the rest of the acts of Manasseh, and his prayer unto his God, and the words of the seers that spake to him in the name of the LORD God of Israel, behold, they are written in the book of the kings of Israel." This book is sometimes called The Acts and Prayers of Manasseh. This text may be identical to another lost book, the Book of the Kings of Israel, above.

The King James Version of this passage reads:

"So all Israel were reckoned by genealogies; and, behold, they were written in the book of the kings of Israel and Judah, who were carried away to Babylon for their transgression. Now the first inhabitants that dwelt in their possessions in their cities were, the Israelites, the priests, Levites, and the subjects (netinim)."

Other versions, e.g. the New King James Version, make clear the scope of the book was the kings of Israel:

... they were inscribed in the book of the kings of Israel. But Judah was carried away captive to Babylon because of their unfaithfulness.

The book is referred to again at 2 Chronicles 20:34, which reads:

"Now the rest of the acts of Jehoshaphat, first and last, behold, they are written in the book of Jehu the son of Hanani, who is mentioned in the book of the kings of Israel."

2 Chronicles 27:7 and 2 Chronicles 36:8 refer to the Book of the Kings of Israel and Judah:

"The other events in Jotham's reign, including his wars and other things he did, are written in the book of the Kings of Israel and Judah."

Basel theologian Hans-Peter Mathys considers the expressions to be "factually identical". Another reference to the text is found in 2 Kings 1:18.

== See also ==
- Table of books of Judeo-Christian Scripture
- Books of Chronicles
