= Lost works of Philip K. Dick =

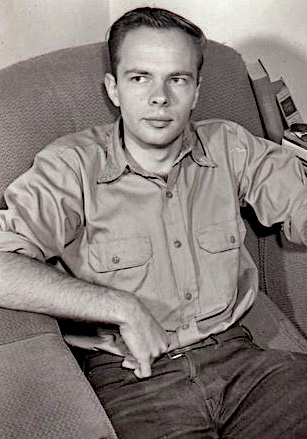
Philip K. Dick, c. 1962

American author Philip K. Dick (1928–1982) is best known for his science fiction works, but he also wrote non-genre fiction, much of which remained unpublished until after his death. From 1952 to 1960, Dick wrote eleven non-genre novels, only one of which (Confessions of a Crap Artist) was published during his lifetime. Seven more were published posthumously, but the remaining three – A Time for George Stavros, Pilgrim on the Hill and Nicholas and the Higs – are considered lost. Short plot summaries of these works are preserved among the index cards written by employees of the Scott Meredith Literary Agency, who were responsible for marketing the novels to publishers, while further information can be derived from Dick's letters, and from the testimony of those who knew him.

Other early works by Dick will likely never be known even by their titles, but evidence exists of two more lost works: a novel called Return to Lilliput, and a short story titled "Menace React".

== A Time for George Stavros ==
A Time for George Stavros was written around 1955–56. The Scott Meredith Literary Agency (SMLA) indexed the manuscript on October 24, 1956, but the index card begins "Didn't like this before & still don't", implying that the work had already been rewritten and resubmitted once before this date. The synopsis on the index card reads as follows:

Long, rambling, glum novel about 65 yr old Greek immigrant who has a weakling son, a second son about whom he's indifferent, a wife who doesn't love him (she's being unfaithful to him). Nothing much happens. Guy, selling garage & retiring, tries to buy another garage in new development, has a couple of falls, dies at end. Point is murky but seems to be that world is disintegrating, Stavros supposed to be symbol of vigorous individuality now a lost commodity.

In a letter to the Harcourt Brace editor Eleanor Dimoff, written on February 1, 1960, Dick describes the protagonist of this work as "an old man with enormous appetite, wit, and tenacity, a kind of genius—and yet hopelessly ignorant of the contemporary ways by which men rise to economic and social success". According to Dick, the worldview expressed in the book is as follows:

Contact with vile persons does not blight or contaminate or doom the really superior; a man can go on and be successful, if he just keeps struggling. There is no trick that the wicked can play on the good that will ultimately be successful; the good are protected by God, or at least by their virtue.

The context of this letter was a contract agreed between Dick and Harcourt Brace a few months earlier – despite rejecting all his previous submissions, the company saw promise in Dick and gave him a $500 advance to write a new mainstream novel. Dick proposed to meet this request with a rewriting of George Stavros, which Dimoff had judged to be the best of his non-genre works. The rewrite was submitted in October 1960 under the title of Humpty Dumpty in Oakland. Although Dick had outlined many changes in his letter, the finished manuscript stuck very closely to the plot of George Stavros; the principal difference being in the home life of the main character, now a childless American named Jim Fergesson. Dick's heavy use of George Stavros in the writing of Humpty Dumpty is probably the reason why the manuscript of the former work is no longer extant.

Humpty Dumpty in Oakland was also rejected by Harcourt Brace, but was published by Gollancz in 1986.

== Pilgrim on the Hill ==
Pilgrim on the Hill was indexed by SMLA on November 8, 1956. The index card reads as follows:

Another rambling, uneven totally murky novel. Man w/psychosis brought on by war thinks he's murdered his wife, flees. Meets 3 eccentrics: an impotent man who refuses to have sex w/his wife, the wife—a beautiful woman who's going to a quack dr. for treatment, an animalistic worker w/ambition but no talent. Man has affair w/wife, is kicked out by husband, tries to help slob. Finally collapses, is sent to hospital, recovers, returns home. BUT WHAT DOES IT ALL MEAN?

All of Dick's unsold mainstream works were returned to him in a single package on July 24, 1963. The manuscript for Pilgrim on the Hill was among them, but it was lost sometime before 1972, when the remainder of Dick's unpublished manuscripts were archived at Cal State Fullerton.

In 1970, Dick claimed that Dr. Bloodmoney was a sci-fi version of "a straight literary novel I long ago wrote". One of Dick's biographers, Lawrence Sutin, has speculated that Pilgrim on the Hill is the straight novel referenced in this letter, although another possibility is The Earthshaker, an unfinished novel that was begun in the late 1940s.

== Nicholas and the Higs ==
Nicholas and the Higs was written in 1957, and received by SMLA on January 3, 1958. The index card reads:

Very long, complex story, usual Dick genius for setting. Future society wherein trading stamps have replaced currency and people live hundreds of miles from work (drive at 190 mph), have set up living tracts. Cars often break down, so they have tract mechanic on full-time basis. Mechanic old, has bad liver, seems to be dying. People of tract use general fund to buy pseudo-organ but man is dead for a few days and "comes back" a bit touched. Sub plot concerns man from whom tract got organ (which is illegal), and how his presence causes moral breakdown of people in tract.

Despite its futuristic setting, the novel was marketed as mainstream fiction. As it was written simultaneously with Time Out of Joint, Gregg Rickman has suggested that these works represent two different approaches to the creation of a "hybrid" novel: while Time Out of Joint was a sci-fi novel with literary elements, Higs appears to have been a literary novel with sci-fi elements.

The manuscript as submitted was 128,000 words; after it had been rejected by four publishers, Dick cut it down to 75,000 words and resubmitted it to SMLA on April 4, 1958. This manuscript was rejected by a further nine publishers. It was returned to Dick on July 24, 1963 (in the same bundle as Pilgrim in the Hill), and was subsequently lost.

In the above-mentioned letter to Eleanor Dimoff (written February 1, 1960), Dick gives the following summary of the work:

This is an odd one, half "straight," half science fiction. An inferior man can destroy a superior one; a Robert Hig can move in and oust Nicholas because he, Hig, has no morals, no taste, no awareness ... Only by relying on base techniques can Nicholas survive; he must terrify Hig by playing on his superstition, his ignorance—on his defects. Instead of appealing to him as a man, a rational grown man, he must demolish him by becoming a parody of the creature itself. Awareness of this is enough to drive Nicholas out; he must give up because to win is to lose; he is involved in a terrible paradox as soon as Hig puts in his appearance. In other words, you can't really beat the Adolf Hitlers; you can only limit their success.

Dick explicitly contrasts this with the message of A Time for George Stavros, observing that "Stavros ... would have been able to manage Hig".

Another fragment of information about this lost work comes from Dick's second wife, Kleo, who said: "The main character was unsuccessful, and never knew why. He wore powder blue suits, left home, never knew why. He left his wife, never knew why."

Parts of this novel appear to have been borrowed for The Penultimate Truth (published 1964), which features characters named Robert Hig and Nicholas, and a dying mechanic in need of an artificial organ.

== Other works ==
Dick's first novel, as he recalled in 1976, was written at the age of 14. Titled Return to Lilliput, the story was loosely based on Jonathan Swift's Gulliver's Travels, and dealt with the rediscovery of the city of Lilliput, which was now underwater and accessible only by submarine. It is likely that Dick wrote other early novels which are no longer known even by their titles.

One page survives of an early short story called "Menace React". Dick appears to have submitted this story to a writer's workshop, as the extant fragment is annotated with handwritten comments such as "Come on, man!". The fragment was published in 2010.

== General references ==
- Dick, Anne R. (1995). The Search for Philip K. Dick. Tachyon Publications. ISBN 978-1-61696-000-1.
- Herron, Don, ed. (1996). The Selected Letters of Philip K. Dick: 1938 – 1971. Vol. 1. Underwood Books. ISBN 978-1-887424-20-2.
- Rickman, Gregg (1989). To the High Castle. Fragments West/The Valentine Press. ISBN 0-916063-24-0.
- Sutin, Lawrence (1989). Divine Invasions: A Life of Philip K. Dick. Harmony Books. ISBN 0-517-57204-4.
- Williams, Paul (1986). Only Apparently Real. Arbor House. ISBN 0-87795-800-9.
