= Bella Germaniae =

Lost historical chronology

- Author: Pliny the Elder
- Language: Latin
- Subject: History of the Roman–Germanic wars
- Genre: Historiography
- Publication date: 1st century AD (posthumously)
- Publication place: Roman Empire
- Pages: 20 volumes

Bella Germaniae (English: The History of the Germanic Wars) was a twenty-volume historical work written by the Roman author and commander Pliny the Elder. It is now a lost literary work. The history chronicled the Roman–Germanic wars and was written from the perspective of a Roman who had served in Germania.

Tacitus is believed to have used Bella Germaniae as a primary source for his own works on the Germanic peoples and wars, including De origine et situ Germanorum and the Annales.

== Background and composition ==
Pliny the Elder began his military service as a junior officer in Germania Inferior around AD 46. He spent a significant portion of his early career on the German frontier, participating in the Roman conquest of the Chauci and serving under commanders such as Gnaeus Domitius Corbulo and Publius Pomponius Secundus. This direct, firsthand experience provided him with extensive knowledge of the region, its peoples, and the ongoing military conflicts.

According to his nephew, Pliny the Younger, the inspiration for writing the history came from a dream. While serving in Germania, Pliny dreamt that the spirit of the Roman general Drusus Nero, who had died campaigning in the region, begged him to save his memory from oblivion. This prompted Pliny to begin what would become a monumental history of all the wars between the Romans and the Germani.

Giving his dream of Drusus as the motivation for writing the Bella Germaniae allowed Pliny to show his loyalty to the Julio-Claudian dynasty, as Drusus had been the father of the emperor Claudius. Additionally, the general Germanicus, whose campaigns against the Germans would certainly have been included in the work, was both Claudius's older brother and the father of Claudius's wife, Agrippina the Younger.

== Content and scope ==
The work was a comprehensive history in 20 volumes. While the exact chronological scope is unknown due to its loss, Ronald Syme speculates that it covered the years up to 47 AD.

Tacitus credits Pliny for the description of Agrippina the Elder standing at the Vetera bridgehead to greet the returning legions who had been surrounded and nearly defeated by Arminius and his forces. Some had argued that the bridge should be destroyed to prevent the advance of the Germans over the Rhine. In the absence of Germanicus, who was leading the troops, Agrippina took charge and prevented this from being done. According to Pliny, she stood at the bridgehead to thank and praise them when they finally returned.

== Legacy and loss ==
Bella Germaniae was a primary authority on the Germanic wars for the generation of historians who followed Pliny. It is the only source expressly cited in the first six books of the Annales of Tacitus, and it is considered a principal source for his ethnographic work, Germania.

Despite its importance, the work did not survive antiquity. It was likely supplanted by the more concise and stylistically influential works of Tacitus, which covered much of the same subject matter. By the early 5th century, the Roman statesman and man of letters Symmachus expressed little hope of finding a copy, indicating that the work was already exceptionally rare or completely lost by that time.

== See also ==
- Pliny the Elder
- Natural History (Pliny)
- Lost literary work
- Tacitus
- Germania (book)
