= Elias Malandris =

Greek theatrologist and director

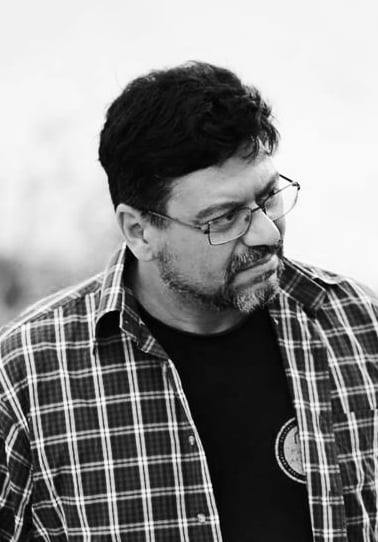
Elias Malandris

Elias Malandris (born 1966) is a theatrologist, director, reconstructor and TV presenter. He was born in Athens and originates from Kasos island.

== Studies ==
He studied theatre at the Drama School of the Athens Conservatoire. He completed Theatre, Film and Television Studies at New York University (1995) and he continued his studies on humanities and Greek and European culture at the Department of Greek Studies of the Open University of Patras. He was the artistic director of the festival of Kasos island, for 17 years.

== Career ==
=== Radio and Television ===
He has been working in radio and television broadcasting, since 1987. He has collaborated with numerous Greek television channels, such as ERT (Hellenic Broadcasting Corporation) ANT1, ALPHA, SKAI and with Bloomberg TV in New York. He has directed more than 1000 various programs and from 1992 to 2001 he was presenting the TV show Estin oun (Έστιν ουν) whose aim was the revival of ancient Greek drama on channel Seven-X and from 2008 until today in Vouli Tileorasi, (the channel of the House of the Parliament).

The series of Test: A Fourth Dimension was a dramatization of the works of the poet Yannis Ritsos, which was honored by the Department of Modern Greek Studies at the Complutense University of Madrid, and was included in its curricula.

He presented several TV projects that were tributes to the National Theatre of Greece, Theatre of Art, of Amphitheatro and of the Theatrical Organization of Cyprus.

He presented the series called “The Streets of the Archangel” about the life and art of the composer Mikis Theodorakis, in TV channels Seven-X and the Channel of the House of Greek Parliament.

In 2004 he presented the musical TV program “The sea tells me a lot when it echoes…”.

In 2005 he presented the TV series “Ihni” (Traces) at ERT1 (Hellenic Broadcasting Corporation).

During the winter of 2006 he presented two projects at the Second and the Third Public radio stations: the first called The Siege of Leningrad by A. Cinistera and the second one called Colchis which was the first reading of the reconstructed lost drama of Sophocles.

=== Cinema ===
He has created three short films: "The Water", "The Songs of Agony" and "The Twelve Words of the Gypsy".

In 2000 he completed and presented a documentary about the ancient customs in Thrace under the title of Tsaousli.

In 2001 he completed his first long film entitled The Yusuri, with the participation of Turkish actors with the music of Stavros Xarchakos and the traditional band Palaiina Schefferia, which is a metaphor of the novel Words of the prow by Andreas Karkavitsas.

=== Theater ===
In 1997, in collaboration with the Euro Info Media and the European Cultural Centre of Delphi, he presented and directed two dramatic works of the poet Angelos Sikelianos "The Last Orphic Dithyramvos" and "Daedalus in Crete" in a first world performance at the Ancient Theatre of Delphi. The music was by Yannis Markopoulos and the scenography by Denny Vachlioti.

From 1998 he traveled around the world with the musical "The Liturgy of Orpheus" (Orpheus‘ Ritual) with the music of Yannis Markopoulos. He has directed performances in most of the Ancient Greek and Roman theatres in Greece.

In 2000 he directed two performances Rebirth at Herodium (Odeon of Herodes Atticus under Acropolis) and The Song of Achilles in the theatre Brachon.(Theatre of the Rocks)

The summer of 2001 he presented at the Herodium the 24 Pyrrhic dances with the National Symphony Orchestra of ERT.

In 2002 he presented "The Liturgy of Orpheus" and "The Paper Dreams" at the Athens Concert Hall Megaron with Mario Frangoulis and Deborah Mayers, and The "Lightwell" with the actress Anna Synodinou at the Theatre Brettania in Athens.

In 2003 he presented "The Muddy Waters" of the poet Nikos Kavvadias in Athens Concert Hall, Megaron with numerous famous Greek artists which was a production of The Company of Friends of the Municipal Theatre of Piraeus, starting then a collaboration of almost a decade when presidents of the company were the ladies A. Ntaifa and E. Meleti. In the same summer he presented "Songs of Piraeus" in Veakio Open Theatre of Piraeus, "The Liturgy of Orpheus" at the archaeological site of the Marathon Tomb and in the Ancient Theatres of Ephesus and of Delphi.

In 2004 he published the study Achilleis which is a reconstruction of the lost Aeschylus trilogy, Myrmidones, Nereides, Phrygians and was presented by the Greek festival and the Cyprus Theatre Organisation at Epidaurus ancient theatre in the summer of 2004, rising protests by Greek philologists but he was vastly praised by the international press and divided the critics.

In 2005 he directed the play "Old Neighbourhood" at the Veakio Open Theatre of Piraeus.

In 2006 he presented at the Herodium, the musical project dedicated to the Nobelist poet Odysseas Elytis When I speak about the sun reciting the Nobel prized poem "Axion Esti", music by Mikis Theodorakis.

In 2006-2007 he presented a tribute to Federico García Lorca on tour around Greece with "The Dark Love". He also directed the concerts of Marios Frangoulis worldwide.

In the summer of 2008, he represented Greece in the international festivals of Ephesus (Izmir) with the reconstruction of Euripides' "Phaethon" directed by Nikos Haralambous and the music of Michalis Christodoulides. He also directed a musical tribute to the god Apollo under the title "Dorion Phos" (Doreian Light). This was also a political event as Cypriot artists were presented in Turkey for the first time under the special permission of the Prime Minister of Turkey. The show was performed in the ancient Library of Celsus.

In 2009, in collaboration with Mario Frangoulis and the Academy of Athens they presented a program for world peace that was performed the same summer at Herodium and in the winter of 2010 in many cities of USA, starting with Boston, under the title "The Light of Greece".

In the summer of 2010, within the same project, the ancient theatre at Pergamon in Turkey opens for the first time, after many years, with the tragedy Aeschylus "Prometheus Bound", directed by Malandris with the participation of great artists, with the original music of Constantine Psachos, choreography by Vassia Angelidou and the collaboration with the Lyceum of Greek Women; the latter under the direction of Kostas Karamanos and the "Spiritual march" with the music of Mikis Theodorakis.

In 2014 he directed and participated on the theatrical play "John Gabriel Borkman", by Henrik Ibsen.

In 2016 he directed the theatrical play "Delikanis", by Manolis Skouloudis at Herodium with 39 actors, more than 80 dancers, and 12 musicians.

In 2017 he directed the musical play "Axion Esti" by Mikis Theodorakis and Odysseas Elytis.

In 2018 he directed the medieval play "Abraham’s sacrifice" at Herodion.

In 2019 he directed "Francis God’s Jester" by Nikos Kazantzakis with the music of Dimitris Papadimitriou.

In 2020 he directed "A season in Hell" by Stratis Paschalis based on letters by Ar. Rimbaud and Paul Verlain with music by Nena Venetsanou.

Also in 2020 he directed Seneca's "Thyestes" for the first time in Greece for the Greek radio ERT.

=== Books and articles ===
In 2004 he published the book Mikis Theodorakis with a CD and DVD collection, a project produced by FM records.

In 2005, his fourth book was published, titled "GREECE IN WORLD WAR II (3CD + 1DVD)" (Εμπρός της Ελλάδος παιδιά) and in 2014 his fifth one titled "Fragments".

He has often collaborated with newspapers as Kathimerini, Imeresia and Acropolis and his articles have been published in "the Political Issues" in the magazine Passworld of Axon Airlines, in which he was the chief-editor, as well.

=== Awards ===
In 2004 he was awarded the Doriza Prize for his contribution to the reconstruction of fragments from ancient drama lost plays.

In 2020, the book of Achilles was voted in the top ten books for 2020 worldwide in its theme.
