= Nereids (play) =

Lost tragedy by Aeschylus

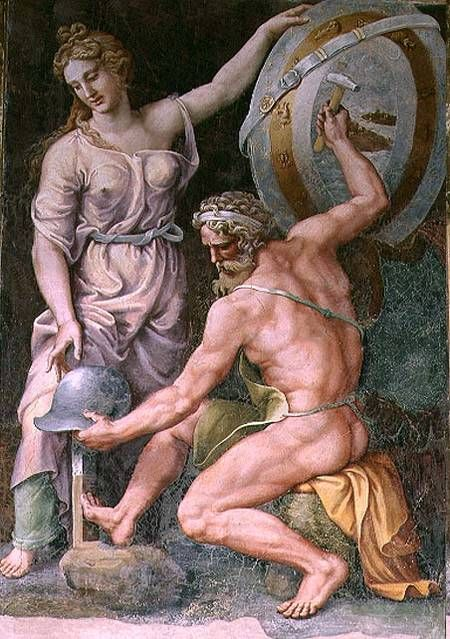
- Hephaestous forging Achilles' Armor by Giulio Romano, ca. 1492-1546
- Original language: Ancient Greek
- Written by: Aeschylus
- Chorus: Nereids
- Characters: Achilles; Thetis
- Subject: Achilles' new armor and death of Hector
- Genre: Greek tragedy
- Setting: Achilles' hut near Troy

Premiere
- Date: c. 499–455 BC
- Place: Athens

The Nereids or Daughters of Nereus (Ancient Greek: Νηρείδες) is a lost ancient Greek tragedy by Aeschylus, an ancient Athenian tragedian of the early half of the fifth century BC. The Nereids was the second play of the Achilleis, a theatrical trilogy which adapted the major events of the Iliad, the eighth-century BC epic poem; Achilles' anger, the death of Patroclus in battle, Achilles' grief and revenge against Hector, and finally the aged king Priam ransoming the body of his son from Achilles.

Very few fragments remain from trilogy overall, and almost nothing from the Nereids in particular. It is unknown what year the tetralogy premiered or what place it got in the annual competition, though it seems that the Achilleis was very popular in antiquity.

== The myth and play ==
The Nereids was part of the now lost Achilleis, a tetralogy of three tragedies and one satyr play adapting the Iliadic events from the seventh-century BC epic poem attributed to Homer. It was the second entry of the group, following the Myrmidons and preceding the Phrygians, both lost. Ancient Greek and Roman writers do not explicitly refer to some unified grouping of those three plays, let alone title them Achilleis, but the existence of such a trilogy centered around Achilles has long been accepted by modern scholars.

The Nereids is thus conjectured to have adapted the eighteenth and nineteenth books of the Iliad which deal with the aftermath of Patroclus' death. Achilles is visited by his mother the sea-goddess Thetis, who consols him for his loss and also brings him new armour to replace the one he lost when Patroclus died, now kept by Hector. Thetis was accompanied by her sisters, the titular Nereids who acted as the play's chorus.

== Plot ==
Due to the minuscule amount of preserved lines, this play's plot is impossible to reconstruct. Based on our knowledge from the Iliad, Thetis arrived with her sisters to comfort her son following the death of Patroclus, and to bring him the new armour Hephaestus made for him, thus merging Thetis' two visits into one so that the Nereids are present throughout the story. The tragedy then likely continued with Achilles preparing to fight against Hector, as Fragment 152 shows a witness' account of a battle. It might have featured a reconciliation between Achilles and the other Greek leaders, but no evidence survives. Another fragment points to the funeral of Patroclus; the play might have even included Achilles' abuse of Hector's body dead body, equivalent to books 20 to 23 of the Iliad.

=== The Nereids dealing with the death of Achilles? ===
Unlike most scholars who agree that Nereids was the trilogy's second play, Martin L. West argued that it was in fact the third (the Phrygians being the second). West claimed that if the play adapted Hector's death, then he only ever appeared dead (the setting being Achilles' tent and not the battlefield outside) making joyful reactions for Achilles' success the only likely respronce from the Nereids, a very odd element for a tragedy. The Nereids then dramatised Achilles' own death from post-Iliadic material. The chorus would have sung lamentations over the hero's dead body. Sommerstein and Michelakis both rejected West's argument on account of Aeschylus' trilogy's influence on classical vase paintings which incorporated the visit of Thetis and the Nereids to the living Achilles.

== Analysis ==
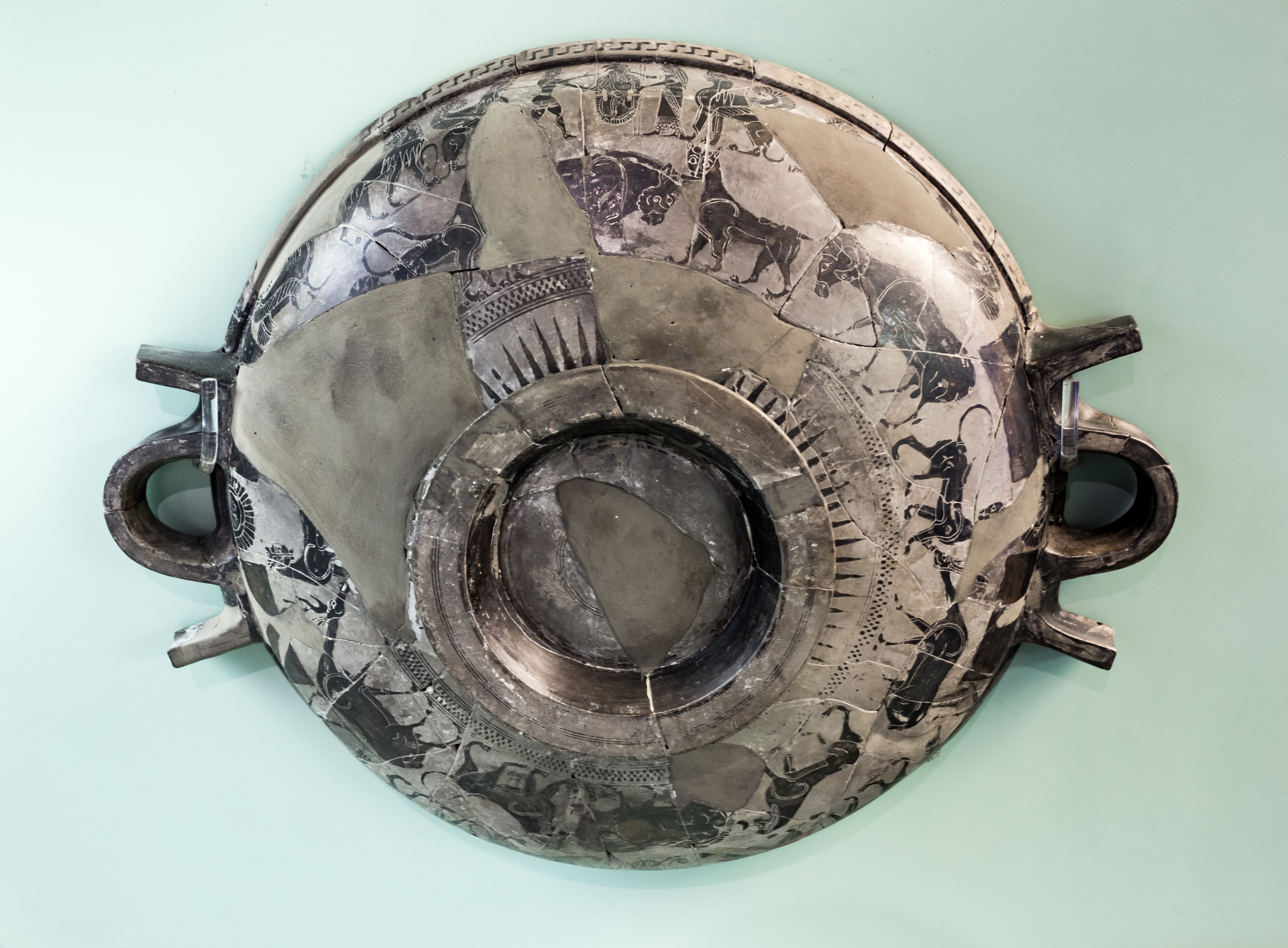
Achilles receives his armour on an Attic black-figure lekanis, c. 580-570 BC Rhodes.

The Myrmidons, the first play of the Achilleis, focused on the protagonist's relations with his own community, but the Nereids (like the Phrygians later) were instead about the relation of Achilles with outsiders such as the divine daughters of Nereus; all three choruses of the tragedies bring Achilles something, to wit bad news about Patroclues, new weapons from Hephaestus and ransom for a dead warrior.

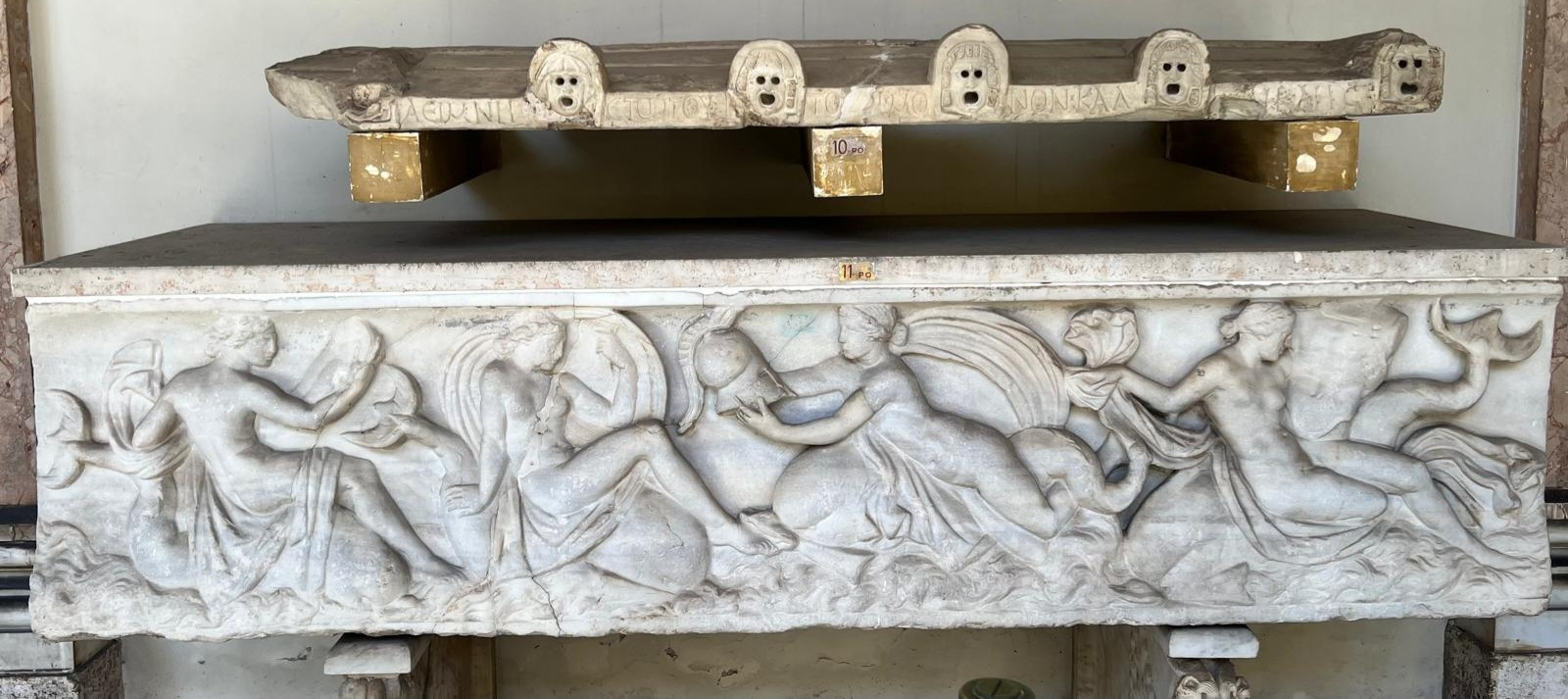
A Roman sarcophagus depicting Nereids carrying arms, Vatican Museums.

Aescylus dramatised moments from the Epic Cycle that were already popular subjects in ancient Greek art, so vase depictions of the events corresponding to the Iliad should not be necessarily identified as depictions of the Achilleis. Nevertheless some examples can be traced back to him, a sign of Aeschylus' success with the ancient Greek audience. An Apulian red-figure volute krater dating to 350 BC kept in the Hermitage State Museum shows Achilles sitting veiled next to Hermes, Athena, Nestor and Antilochus. Priam is portrayed as a supplicant next to Thetis; as those people did not appear in all three tragedies together, the vase can be assumed to be a presentation of the entire trilogy.

Thetis arriving to bring arms to Achilles was also a popular theme in pottery even before Aeschylus, however some examples might have been inspired directly by the play itself. A 310s BC red-figure volute krater with Achilles, Thetis and a Nereid might have an Aeschylean connection due to the tragedy-reminiscent composition of its scenes.

== See also ==
Other Greek tragedies:

- Women of Colchis
- Rhesus
- Philoctetes

== Bibliography ==
- Finglass, P. J. (2023). "Aeschylus, Lyric and Epic". In Bromberg, Jacques A.; Burian, Peter (eds.). A Companion to Aeschylus. Wiley-Blackwell. ISBN 9781405188043.
- Hathorn, Richmond Y. (1967). Crowell's Handbook to Classical Drama. NYC, United States: Thomas Y. Crowell Company. ISBN 0-690-22501-6.
- Homer, The Iliad with an English Translation by A. T. Murray, PhD in two volumes. Cambridge, MA., Harvard University Press; London, William Heinemann, Ltd. 1924. Online version at the Perseus Digital Library.
- Michelakis, Pantelis (2002). Achilles in Greek Tragedy. Cambridge, UK: Cambridge University Press. ISBN 978-0-521-81843-8.
- Radt, Stefan L. (1985). Tragicorum Graecorum Fragmenta (TrGF). Vol. 3: Aeschylus. Göttingen.
- Sommerstein, Alan H. (2009). Aeschylus: Fragments. Loeb Classical Library 505. Cambridge, MA: Harvard University Press. ISBN 978-0-674-99629-8.
- Taplin, Oliver (2007). Pots & Plays: Interactions Between Tragedy and Greek Vase-Painting of the Fourth Century B.C. CA, United States: Getty Publications. ISBN 978-0-89236-807-5.
- West, Martin L. (2000). "Iliad and Aethiopis on the Stage: Aeschylus and Son". The Classical Quarterly. 50 (2). Cambridge University Press.
- Wright, Matthew (2019). The Lost Plays of Greek Tragedy. Vol. 2: Aeschylus, Sophocles and Euripides. London, UK: Bloomsbury Academic. ISBN 978-1-4742-7646-7.
