= Martin Cropp =

Classical scholar (born 1943)

Martin John Cropp
- Born: 1943 (age 82–83); Welwyn, United Kingdom

Academic background
- Education: Wadham College, Oxford; University of Toronto
- Doctoral advisor: Desmond Conacher

Academic work
- Discipline: Classics
- Sub-discipline: Ancient Greek literature
- Institutions: University of Calgary

Martin John Cropp (born 1943) is a classical scholar, known for his work on the Greek tragic playwright Euripides.

== Biography ==
Cropp was born in Welwyn in 1943. He studied at Wadham College, Oxford from 1961, graduating BA in 1965. After working for some time as a civil servant, he studied from 1970 at the University of Toronto, where he graduated MA in 1971 and obtained his doctorate in 1976. His doctoral thesis, written under the supervision of Desmond Conacher, was a commentary on the first half of Euripides' tragedy Heracles. In 1974, he was appointed as a lecturer in classics at the University of Calgary, where he remained for the rest of his career and is now professor emeritus.

Over the course of his career, Cropp has focused primarily on the work of Euripides. His first book was a 1985 study of the stylistic criteria for dating Euripides' fragmentary plays, written in collaboration with the statistician Gordon Fick. Cropp contributed commentaries on Electra and Iphigenia in Tauris to the "Aris and Phillips Classical Texts" series of editions of Euripides, edited by Christopher Collard, in 1988 and 2000, and revised each of these in updated second editions in 2013 and 2023. In collaboration with Collard, Cropp contributed to the Aris and Phillips editions of selected fragmentary plays by Euripides in 1995 and 2004, and co-authored the Loeb Classical Library edition of the Euripidean fragments in 2008.

From 1984 to 1990, Cropp was joint editor of the journal Échos du monde classique: Classical Views, alongside John C. Yardley.

In 1999, Cropp and Kevin H. Lee organised a major conference on Euripides at the Banff Centre west of Calgary, with Desmond Conacher as the guest of honour. This led to the publication in 2000 of a volume of essays, Euripides and Tragic Theatre in the Late Fifth Century.

Cropp was honoured in 2009 with a Festschrift, titled The Play of Texts and Fragments: Essays in Honour of Martin Cropp.

== Selected publications ==
=== Monograph ===
- Cropp, Martin J.; Fick, Gordon (1985). Resolutions and Chronology in Euripides: The Fragmentary Tragedies. Institute of Classical Studies.

=== Editions of ancient texts ===
- Collard, Christopher; Cropp, Martin J.; Lee, Kevin H. (1995). Euripides: Selected Fragmentary Plays, Volume I. Aris and Phillips. ISBN 9780856686191.
- Collard, Christopher; Cropp, Martin J.; Gibert, John C. (2004). Euripides: Selected Fragmentary Plays, Volume II. Aris and Phillips. ISBN 9780856686214.
- Collard, Christopher; Cropp, Martin J. (2008). Euripides: Fragments. Aegeus – Meleager. Harvard University Press. ISBN 9780674996250.
- Collard, Christopher; Cropp, Martin J. (2008). Euripides: Fragments. Oedipus – Chrysippus. Harvard University Press. ISBN 9780674996311.
- Cropp, Martin J. (2013). Euripides: Electra (2nd ed.). Oxbow Books. ISBN 9781908343697.
- Cropp, Martin J. (2019). Minor Greek Tragedians, Volume 1: The Fifth Century. Liverpool University Press. ISBN 9781786942036.
- Cropp, Martin J. (2021). Minor Greek Tragedians, Volume 2: Fourth-Century and Hellenistic Poets. Liverpool University Press. ISBN 9781802078237.
- Cropp, Martin J. (2023). Euripides: Iphigenia in Tauris (2nd ed.). Liverpool University Press. ISBN 9781837644315.

=== Edited volumes ===
- Cropp, Martin J.; Fantham, Elaine; Scully, Stephen E., eds. (1986). Greek Tragedy and its Legacy: Essays presented to D. J. Conacher. University of Calgary Press. ISBN 9780919813243.
- Cropp, Martin J.; Lee, Kevin H.; Sansone, David, eds. (2000). Euripides and Tragic Theatre in the Late Fifth Century. Stipes Publishing.
