= Achilleis =

Achilleis is a title used to refer to several literary works concerning Achilles:

- The Achilleis, the modern designation for a trilogy of lost plays by Aeschylus
- The Achilleid, an unfinished epic by Statius, Achilleis being the Latin nominative of the title
- The Achilleis byzantina, or "byzantine Achilleid", a 13th or 14th century Greek romance; see Byzantine literature
- The Achilleis, an unfinished German poem by Johann Wolfgang von Goethe
