= Donald Mastronarde =

American classical scholar (born 1948)

Donald John Mastronarde
- Born: 1948 (age 77–78); Hartford, Connecticut, United States

Academic background
- Education: Amherst College (BA); Wadham College, Oxford (BA); University of Toronto (PhD)
- Doctoral advisor: Desmond Conacher

Academic work
- Discipline: Classics
- Sub-discipline: Ancient Greek literature
- Institutions: University of California, Berkeley
- Doctoral students: Barbara Goff
- Notable works: The Art of Euripides (2010)

Donald John Mastronarde (/ˌmæstrəˈnɑːrdi/ MA-strə-NAR-dee; born 1948) is an American classical scholar, known for his work on the Greek tragic playwright Euripides.

== Biography ==
Mastronarde was born in Hartford, Connecticut in 1948. He studied at Amherst College from 1966, obtaining his BA in 1969, and then at Wadham College, Oxford, obtaining his BA there in 1971. He then studied at the University of Toronto from 1971 to 1973, obtaining his doctorate in 1974 with a dissertation titled "Studies in Euripides' Phoinissai", written under the supervision of Desmond Conacher.

Since 1973, he has worked at the University of California, Berkeley. From 1992 to 1996, he was the chief editor of the journal Classical Antiquity. He served as department chair from 1993 to 2000, and was named Melpomene Distinguished Professor of Classical Languages and Literature in 2001. His doctoral students at Berkeley included Barbara Goff.

He retired in 2015, and since 2016 has served as Melpomene Professor Emeritus and Professor of the Graduate School. In 2017, he was elected as a member of the American Academy of Arts and Sciences. His recent research has focused on creating an online critical edition and translation of the scholia to Euripides. The first release, containing the scholia on the first 500 lines of Euripides' Orestes, appeared in 2020, followed by releases of the rest of the scholia on this tragedy in 2023 and 2025.

== Selected publications ==
=== Monographs ===
- Mastronarde, Donald J. (1979). Contact and Discontinuity: Some Conventions of Speech and Action on the Greek Tragic Stage. University of California Publications in Classical Studies. ISBN 9780520096011.
- Mastronarde, Donald J.; Bremer, J. M. (1982). The Textual Tradition of Euripides' Phoinissai. University of California Publications in Classical Studies. ISBN 9780520096646.
- Mastronarde, Donald J. (2010). The Art of Euripides: Dramatic Technique and Social Context. Cambridge University Press. ISBN 9781107646612.
- Mastronarde, Donald J. (2017). Preliminary Studies on the Scholia to Euripides. California Classical Studies. ISBN 9781939926104.

=== Editions of ancient texts ===
- Mastronarde, Donald J. (1988). Euripides: Phoenissae. Teubner. ISBN 9783598713361.
- Mastronarde, Donald J. (1994). Euripides: Phoenissae. Cambridge University Press. ISBN 9780521604468.
- Mastronarde, Donald J. (2002). Euripides: Medea. Cambridge University Press. ISBN 9780511806223.
- Mastronarde, Donald J. (2025). "Euripides Scholia". Ongoing web project: Release 3, containing the scholia to Euripides' Orestes.

=== Textbook ===
- Mastronarde, Donald J. (2013). Introduction to Attic Greek (2nd ed.). University of California Press. ISBN 9780520275713.

=== Edited volume ===
- Griffith, Mark; Mastronarde, D. J., eds. (1990). Cabinet of the Muses: Essays on Classical and Comparative Literature in Honor of Thomas G. Rosenmeyer. Scholars Press. ISBN 9781555404093.
