= Great Dover Street woman =

Skeleton of a woman from Roman London

- Period/culture: Roman
- Discovered: 1996; 165 Great Dover Street, Southwark, London, England.
- Present location: Museum of London

The Great Dover Street woman is the skeleton of a Romano-British woman discovered in excavations at 165 Great Dover Street, Southwark, London. She is suggested to have been a female gladiator, though this interpretation is contested.

== Discovery and context ==
The discovery of the Great Dover Street woman was announced in 2000 following excavations in 1996 at the site by Museum of London Archaeology.

The grave was a cremation dating from the early 2nd- to mid-3rd-century AD, from a bustum funeral over a pit into which the remains eventually fell and were covered. This sort of burial is rare in Roman Britain. Eight unburnt ceramic lamps and eight tazze were added to the grave fill after the cremation. There was also evidence for molten glass, gold textile, burnt pine cones, chicken, bread, and dates forming part of the cremation ritual. Only a small amount of human bone survived. A fragment of surviving pelvis indicated that it was the skeleton of a female in her 20s.

== Interpretation as a gladiator ==
Archaeologists at the Museum of London argue that the remains might represent the first female gladiator discovered, with Jenny Hall (then curator of early London history at the museum) saying that this interpretation was "70% probable". The presence of a gladiatorial image on one of the lamps and the style of the burial are indicators of this interpretation. In the 2000 report of the excavations by MOLA, Angela Wardle concluded that whilst the interpretation of this cremation as a gladiator "can only be speculative... it is certainly possible." The identification of the burial as a gladiator was popularised by an episode of the television series Secrets of the Dead called "Gladiator Girl". It was further enhanced by the publication of a companion book to the programme titled Gladiatrix: The True Story of History’s Unknown Woman Warrior.

Commenting on its discovery, Mary Beard said that the evidence for this identification "seems thin". Anna McCullough argued in 2008 that the burial at Great Dover Street cannot be used for research on female gladiators because the evidence is too speculative. Nick Bateman concluded that the burial was more likely to represent a complex religious and ritual process which incorporated gladiatorial images rather than representing the life experience of the woman as a gladiator. In a 2021 article Alexandra Sills referred to the identification of this burial as that of a gladiator: "attempts to identify the remains of Roman women as gladiators, such as the Great Dover Street lady of London, are often influenced by the desire for a good story rather than conclusive material evidence". The Great Dover Street woman's burial has also been argued to have been that of a partner or lover of a gladiator.

== See also ==
- Gladiatrix
