= Odeon of Herodes Atticus =

Ancient Roman theater in Athens

Odeon of Herodes Atticus (Herodeion)
- Ωδείο Ηρώδου του Αττικού (Ηρώδειο)
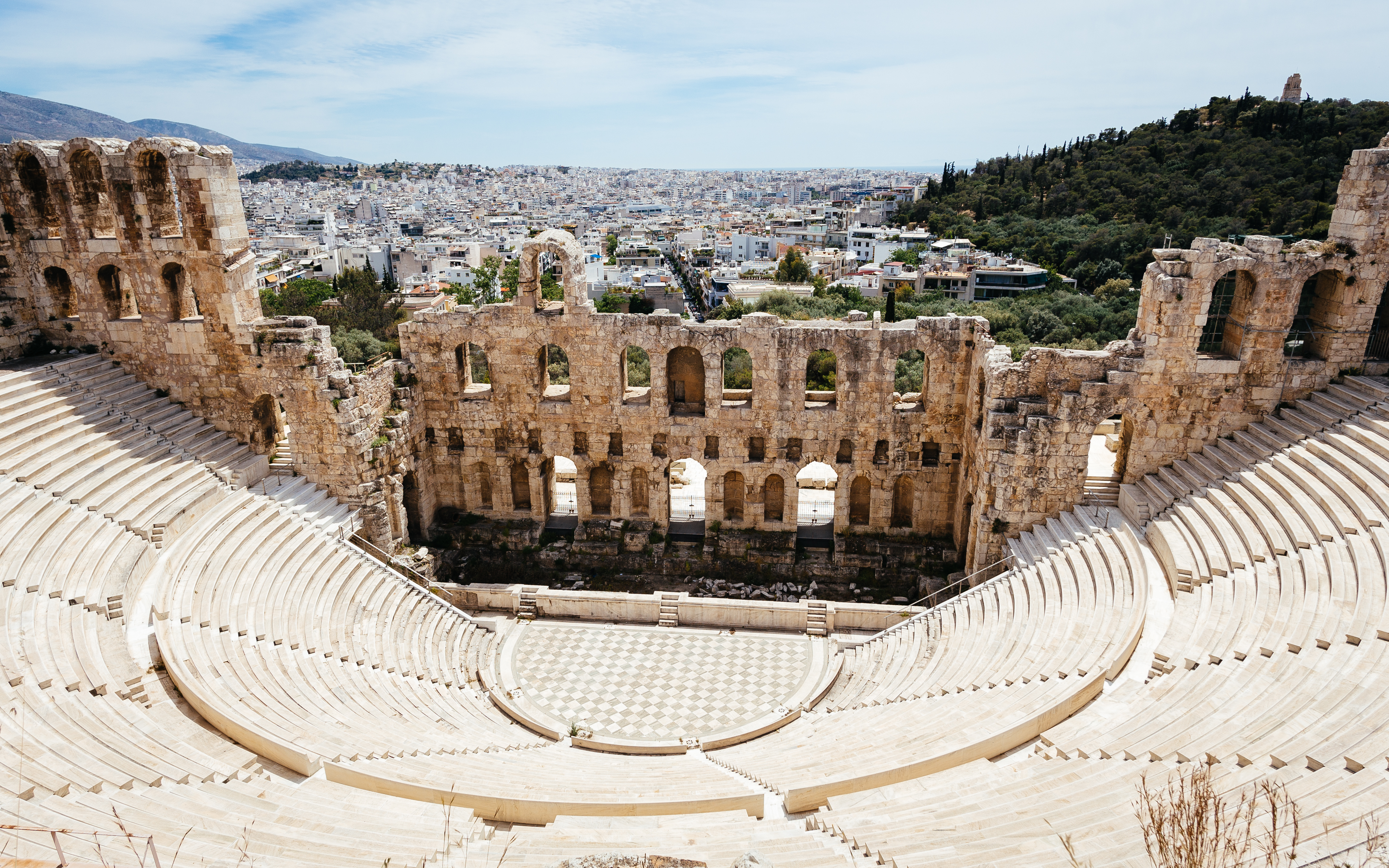

- Location within Athens
- Alternative names: Herod Atticus Odeon / Odeum

General information
- Type: Odeon
- Architectural style: Classical
- Location: Dionysiou Areopagitou Street, Athens, Greece
- Coordinates: 37.970756°N 23.724444°E
- Completed: AD 161
- Renovated: 1950

Height
- Roof: Destroyed in AD 267

Technical details
- Floor count: 3

Design and construction
- Main contractor: Herodes Atticus

Other information
- Seating type: Stone benches
- Seating capacity: 5,000

The Odeon of Herodes Atticus (Greek: Ωδείο Ηρώδου του Αττικού; also called Herodeion or Herodion; Greek: Ηρώδειο) is a stone Greek theatre structure located on the southwest slope of the Acropolis of Athens, Greece. The building was completed in AD 161 and then renovated in 1950.

== Ancient times ==
It was built in AD 161 by orator Herodes Atticus in memory of his Roman wife, Aspasia Annia Regilla, and created as a gift to the city as symbol of his generosity. It was originally a steep-sloped theatre with a three-story stone front wall and a wooden roof made of expensive cedar of Lebanon timber.

It was used as a Roman theater, had a semi-circular cavea, and 33 rows of marble seats in addition to scenery structures 28 meters high. The theater had niches, where statues were placed, and entry portico with a mosaic floor.

It was used as a venue for music concerts with a capacity of 5,000 and was the largest of its time. It lasted intact until it was destroyed and left in ruins by the Heruli in AD 267.

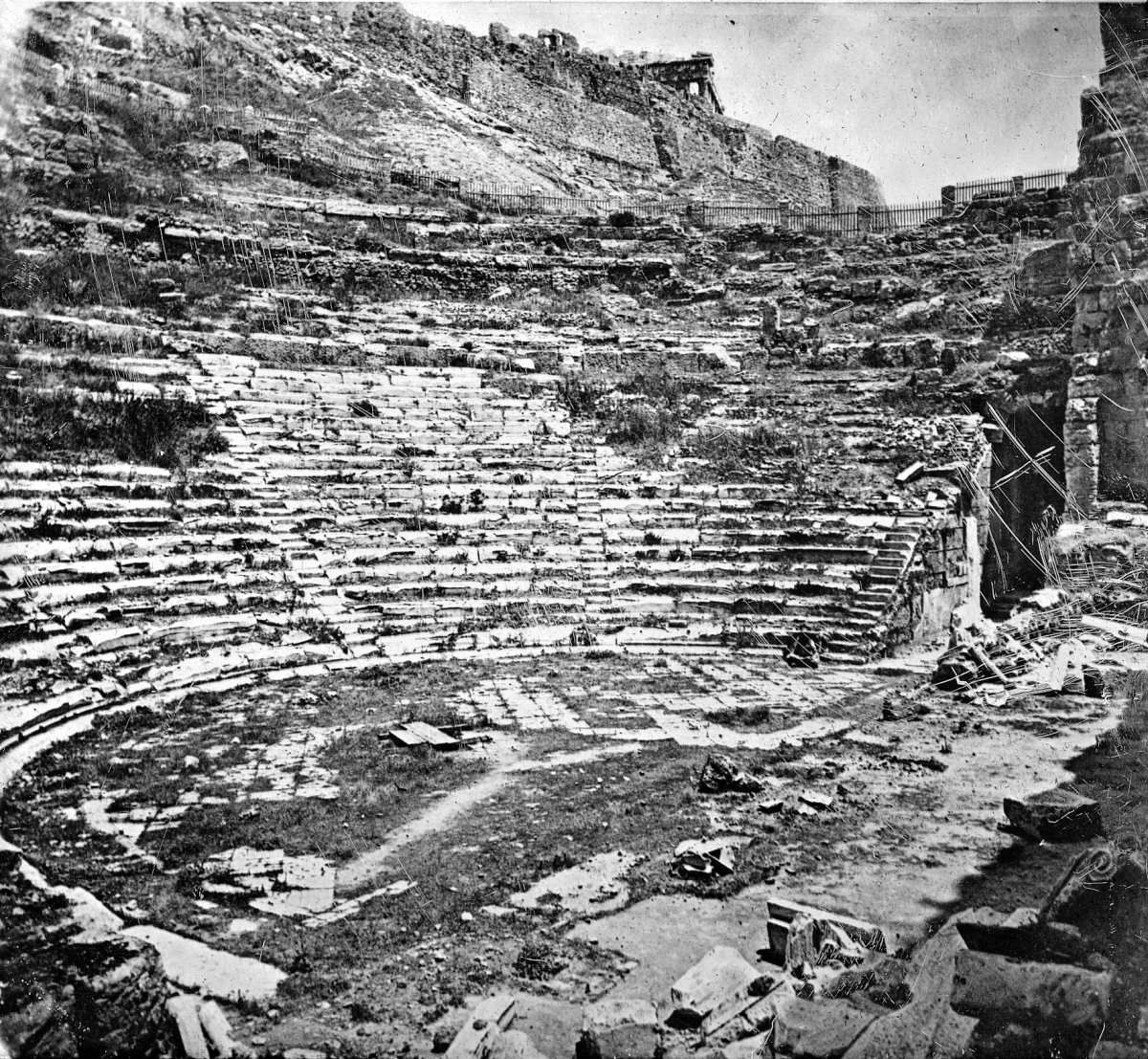
Historical image of Odeon of Herodes Atticus (ca. 1880)

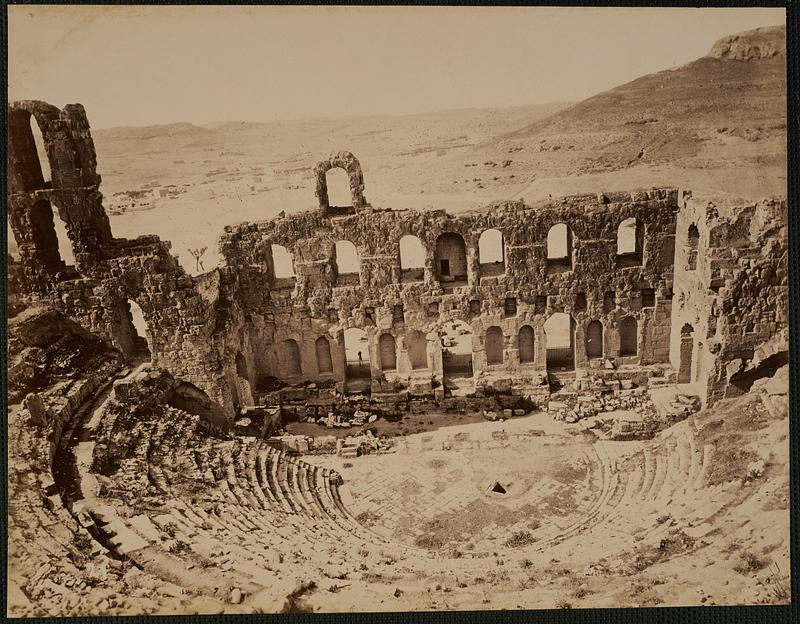
Odeon of Herodus Atticus, 1870–1880. Nicholas Catsimpoolas Collection, Boston Public Library

== Modern events ==
The audience stands and the orchestra (stage) were restored using Pentelic marble in the 1950s. Since then it has been the main venue of the Athens Festival, which runs from May through October each year, featuring a variety of acclaimed Greek as well as International performances. Following the 2026 festival, the theatre will close for at least three years for restoration.

In 1957, Maria Callas performed at the Odeon as part of the Athens Festival and in the same year Edith Hamilton was pronounced an honorary citizen of Athens at ninety years of age. In May 1962 Frank Sinatra gave two benefit concerts for the city of Athens. The Odeon of Herodes Atticus was the venue for the Miss Universe 1973 pageant. Another memorable performance at the Odeon of Herodes Atticus was given by the Greek singer Nana Mouskouri in 1984; after 20 years of absence she returned to her country. Luciano Pavarotti performed at the Odeon twice, in 1991 and in 2004. Vangelis' Mythodea premiered at Odeon of Herodes Atticus in July 1993 and the venue hosted Yanni's Live at the Acropolis performance in September 1993. Sting performed at the venue during his Mercury Falling Tour on May 17, 1996. In June 2018 he returned for two more concerts. Mario Frangoulis has performed at the historic theatre with Yannis Markopoulos' and directed by Elias Malandris, Orpheus in 1996 and also played the role of Erotokritos in his work based on Vitsentzos Kornaros' Erotokritos. He also performed 'Axion Esti' poem by Odysseus Elytis music by Mikis Theodorakis and conducted by the composer himself in May 1998 to benefit Elpida Foundation for children suffering from cancer. Elton John performed two concerts at the venue during his Medusa tour in 2000. In 2007, Greek singer Haris Alexiou performed a concert which she dedicated to Manos Loizos. In June 2008, Sylvie Guillem performed Boléro in company with the Tokyo Ballet as part of the Athens Festival. In September 2010, tenor Andrea Bocelli held a concert at the Odeon to raise funds for cancer research. In 2012, Mario Frangoulis performed the leading role in Carl Orff's Carmina Burana at the Herodes Atticus theatre. In 2020 the first art exhibition was held on the site, by Greek artist Dionisis Kavallieratos, entitled 'Disoriented Dance / Misled Planet' organised by NEON Organization and the Athens and Epidaurus Festival. On July 12, 2022 Jeff Mills performed on the site with his project Tomorrow Comes the Harvest for the Athens Epidaurus Festival with Jean-Phi Dary on piano, Divinity Roxx on bass guitar, and Rashida Ali on flute. James recorded their album "Live at the Acropolis" on the 10th July 2023. In June 2024, Coldplay shot the music video for the single, "Feelslikeimfallinginlove". On September 28, 2024, the Greek symphonic death metal band Septicflesh performed a live set with an orchestra.

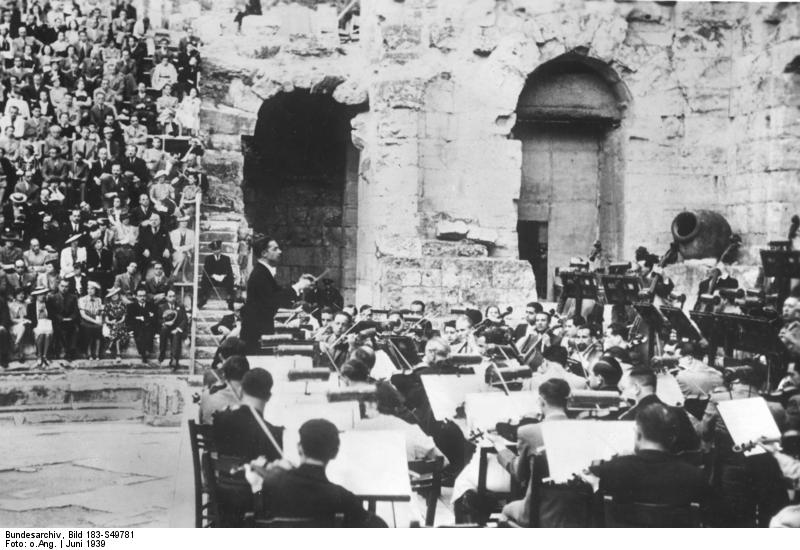
Herbert von Karajan and the Orchestra of the Athens Conservatory (later to become the Athens State Orchestra) at the Odeon of Herodes Atticus (1939)

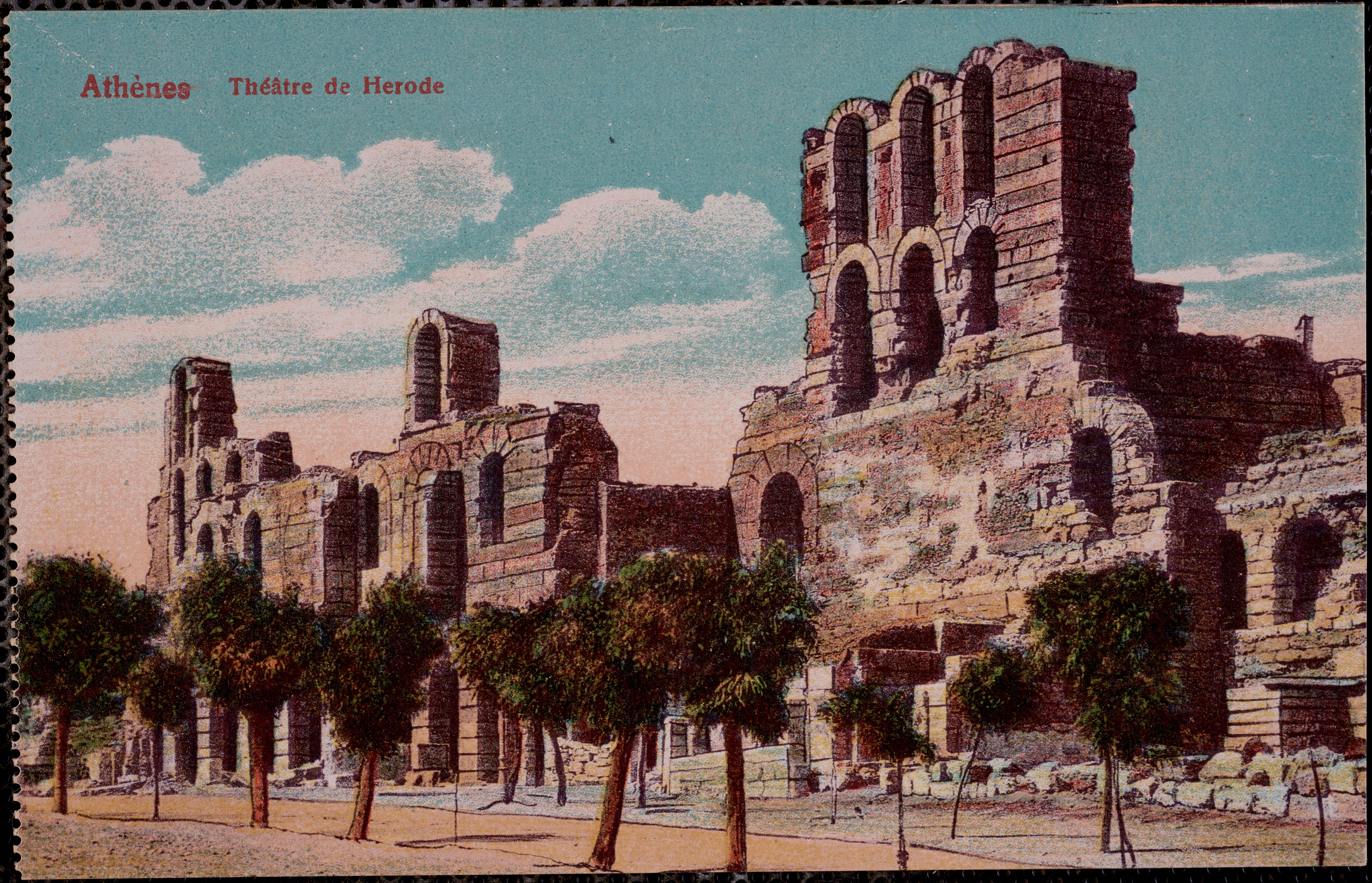
Athènes. Théâtre de Herode, ca. 1907–1915; from the Nicholas Catsimpoolas Collection of the Boston Public Library

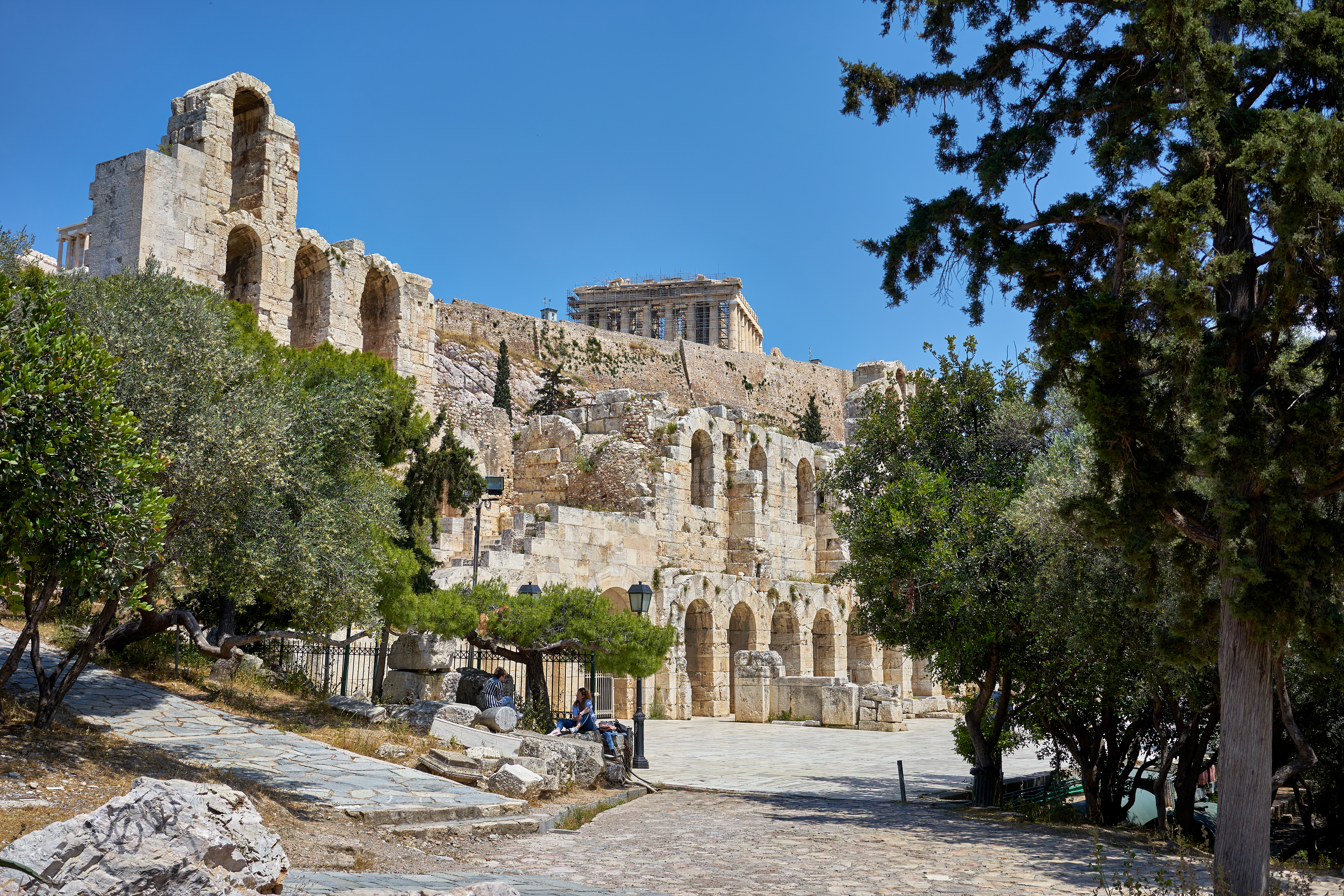
The Odeon of Herodes Atticus with the Parthenon in the background (2020)

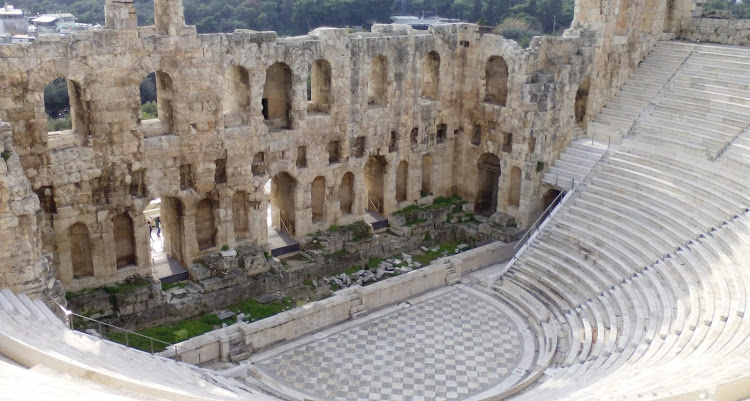
A wide-angle, high-perspective shot of the Odeon of Herodes Atticus (also known as the Herodeion) in Athens. This is one of the most iconic and best-preserved ancient theaters in the world, located on the southwest slope of the Acropolis.

== See also ==
- List of concert halls
- List of contemporary amphitheaters
- Villa of Herodes Atticus

| Preceded by Cerromar Beach Hotel (Puerto Rico) Dorado | Miss Universe venue 1973 | Succeeded by Folk Arts Theater (Philippines) Pasay |
