= Barbara Goff =

British classical scholar

Academic background
- Education: University of Cambridge, University of California, Berkeley
- Doctoral advisor: Donald Mastronarde

Academic work
- Discipline: Classics
- Sub-discipline: Classical reception studies
- Institutions: University of Reading
- Notable works: Citizen Bacchae: women's ritual practice in ancient Greece

Barbara Elizabeth Goff is a Classics Professor at the University of Reading. She specialises in Greek tragedy and its reception; women in antiquity; postcolonial classics and reception of Greek political thought.

== Education ==
Goff undertook her undergraduate degree at King's College, Cambridge. She later completed her PhD at the University of California, Berkeley on Euripides' Hippolytus supervised by Donald Mastronade, publishing the work as The Noose of Words: Readings of Desire, Violence and Language in Euripides' Hippolytus in 1990.

== Career ==
Goff's first job was as a Junior Research Fellow at King's College Cambridge. She has also worked at the University of Texas at Austin, and held a Solmsen Fellowship at the Institute for Humanities at the University of Wisconsin, Madison.

Goff moved to the University of Reading first as a Reader in Classics, subsequently becoming Professor of Classics. She leads modules focusing on ancient drama, ancient Greek language, ancient sport, and sexuality and gender in the ancient world.

Goff's work on classical reception has led to lectures and publications on classical education and reception in west Africa, including participation in the founding of the Classical Association of Ghana in 2018.

== Research groups and centres ==
At the University of Reading, Goff is a member of the Ancient Literature and Classical Tradition and Reception groups in the Department of Classics.

Goff is a member of the Ancient and Modern Imperialisms Network, based in Reading and helps to run the Legacy of Greek Political Thought Network, based in Reading, and is an executive committee member of the Classical Reception Studies Network, based at the Open University.

Goff is on the international editorial boards of the Classical Receptions Journal (published by the Oxford University Press) and of Elektra (University of Patras) and is on the advisory board of the AHRC project 'Classics and Class', based in King's College London. She also works with the Iris Project to promote classical education.

== Books ==
- Goff, B. (1990) The Noose of Words: Readings of Desire, Violence and Language in Euripides' Hippolytus. Cambridge: Cambridge University Press. ISBN 0-521-36397-7
- Goff, B. (ed.) (1995) History, Tragedy, Theory: Dialogues on Athenian Drama (University of Texas Press)
- Goff, B. (2004) Citizen Bacchae: women's ritual practice in ancient Greece. University of California Press, Berkeley and Los AngelesISBN 9780520239982
- Goff, B. (ed.) (2005) Classics and Colonialism. Bloomsbury. ISBN 9780715633113
- Goff, B. and Simpson, M. (2007) Crossroads in the Black Aegean: Oedipus, Antigone and dramas of the African Diaspora. Oxford University Press, Oxford. ISBN 9780199217182
- Goff, B. (2009) Euripides: Trojan Women. Duckworth companions to Greek and Roman Tragedy. Duckworth, London. ISBN 9780715635452
- Goff, B. (2013) 'Your secret language': classics in the British colonies of West Africa. Classical Diaspora. Bloomsbury Academic, London. ISBN 9781780932057
