= Desmond Conacher =

Canadian classical scholar (1918–2000)

Desmond John Conacher
- Born: 27 December 1918; Kingston, Canada
- Died: 23 October 2000 (aged 81); Toronto, Canada

Academic background
- Education: Queen's University at Kingston; University of Chicago

Academic work
- Discipline: Classics
- Sub-discipline: Ancient Greek literature
- Institutions: University of Saskatchewan; University of Toronto
- Doctoral students: Martin Cropp, Donald Mastronarde, Anthony Podlecki
- Notable works: Euripidean Drama: Myth, Theme and Structure (1967)

Desmond John Conacher (27 December 1918 – 23 October 2000) was a Canadian classical scholar, known for his work on Greek tragedy.

== Biography ==
Conacher was born on 27 December 1918 in Kingston, Ontario, the younger son of William Morison Conacher and Madeline Cashel Conacher. William Morison Conacher was professor of French at Queen's University, Kingston, and his elder son James B. Conacher also went on a distinguished academic career, as a scholar of Canadian history.

Conacher studied at Queen's University, graduating BA in 1941 and MA in 1942. He was a lecturer in classics at Dalhousie University in 1946–1947, and became an assistant professor at the University of Saskatchewan in 1947. While holding this position, he obtained his doctorate from the University of Chicago in 1951 under the supervision of Benedict Einarson, with a thesis on conceptions of pleasure in the pre-Socratic philosophers.

In 1952 he was made an associate professor at Saskatchewan, before moving in 1958 to Trinity College, Toronto, where he became full professor in 1965. He served from 1966 to 1972 as the head of the classics department at Trinity College, and from 1972 to 1975 as the chair of the intercollegiate classics department of the University of Toronto. His doctoral students at Toronto included Anthony Podlecki, Donald Mastronarde, and Martin Cropp. He was elected Fellow of the Royal Society of Canada in 1976, and retired from his professorship in 1984.

Conacher was known chiefly as a specialist in ancient Greek tragedy. He established his reputation with his 1967 book on Euripides, Euripidean Drama: Myth, Theme and Structure. In the decades that followed, he produced "literary commentaries" on all seven plays attributed to Aeschylus, providing a running discussion of each play, but in literary terms rather than with a focus on textual criticism and linguistic details in the manner of most scholarly commentaries on tragedy at the time.

In 1986, Conacher was honoured with a Festschrift, titled Greek Tragedy and Its Legacy: Essays Presented to D. J. Conacher. From 1991 until his death he was honorary president of the Classical Association of Canada, and he also received honorary doctorates from Dalhousie University (1992), the University of Victoria (1993), Queen's University (1995), and the University of Saskatchewan (1997). He was the guest of honour at the major conference on Euripides held at the Banff Centre in 1999, which resulted in an edited volume dedicated to him, Euripides and Tragic Theatre in the Late Fifth Century.

He died in Toronto on 23 October 2000. His academic papers are held in the archives of Trinity College, Toronto.

== Selected publications ==
- Conacher, Desmond J. (1967). Euripidean Drama: Myth, Theme and Structure. University of Toronto Press. ISBN 9780802051905.
- Conacher, Desmond J. (1980). Aeschylus' Prometheus Bound: A Literary Commentary. University of Toronto Press. ISBN 9780802064165.
- Conacher, Desmond J. (1980). Aeschylus' Oresteia: A Literary Commentary. University of Toronto Press. ISBN 9781442670679.
- Conacher, Desmond J. (1988). Euripides: Alcestis. Aris and Phillips. ISBN 9780856682353.
- Conacher, Desmond J. (1996). Aeschylus: The Earlier Plays and Related Studies. University of Toronto Press. ISBN 9780802071552.
- Conacher, Desmond J. (1998). Euripides and the Sophists. Duckworth. ISBN 9780715628164.
