= Phrygians (play) =

Lost tragedy by Aeschylus

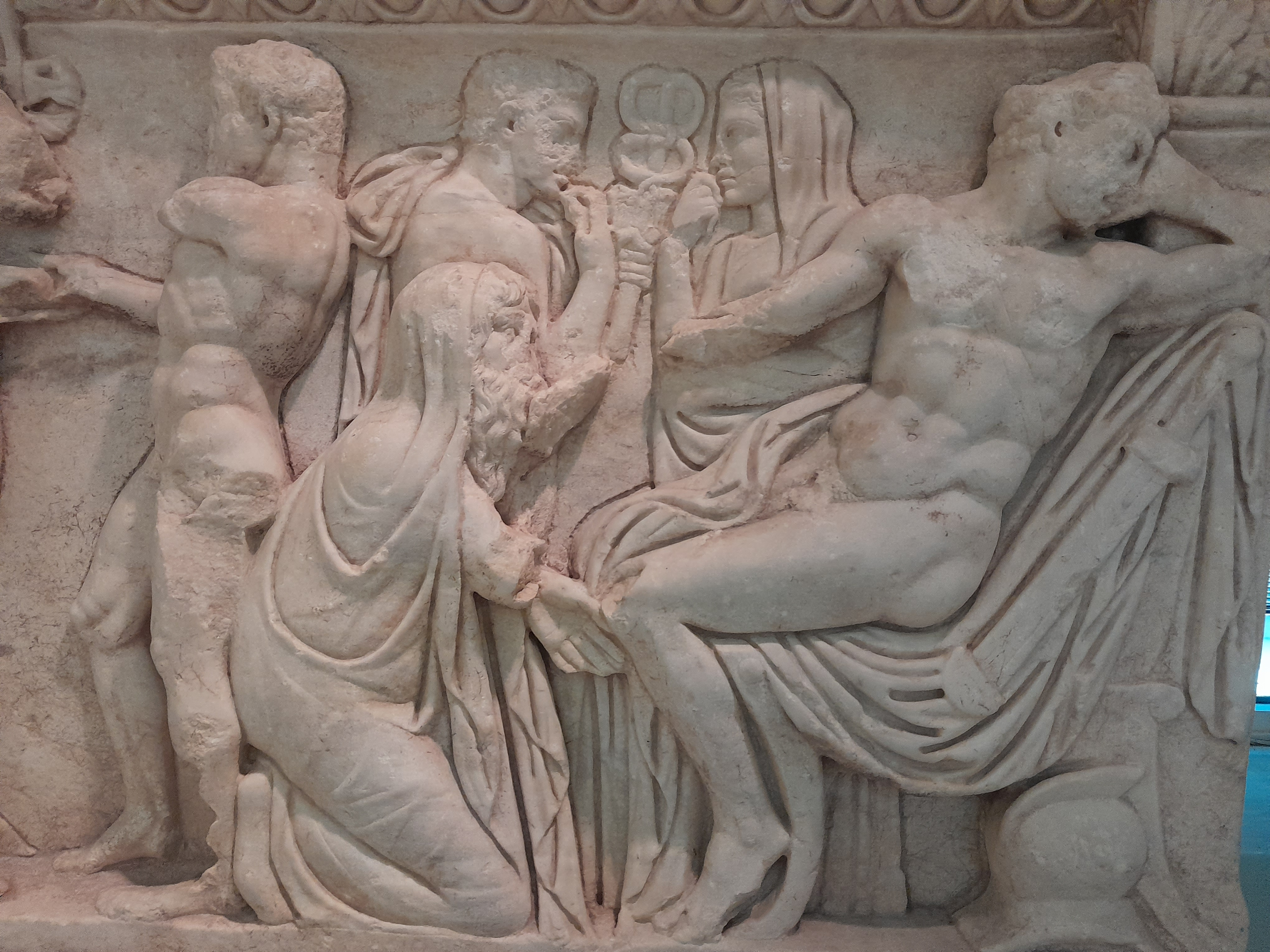
- Priam begs Achilles from a 2nd-century Roman sarcophagus, Archaeological Museum of Ioannina
- Original language: Ancient Greek
- Written by: Aeschylus
- Chorus: Phrygians
- Characters: Achilles; Priam; Hermes; Briseis ?
- Subject: Hector's ransom
- Genre: Greek tragedy
- Setting: Achilles' hut near Troy

Premiere
- Date: c. 499–455 BC
- Place: Athens

The Phrygians (Ancient Greek: Φρύγες) or The Ransoming of Hector (Ancient Greek: Ἕκτορος Λύτρα) is a lost ancient Greek tragedy by Aeschylus, the renowned Athenian tragedian who flourished in the early half of the fifth century BC. The Phrygians was the third and final play of the Achilleis, a theatrical trilogy which adapted the core events of the Iliad; Achilles' anger at Agamemnon, the death of Patroclus at the hands of Hector, Achilles' grief and revenge against Hector, and finally Priam ransoming the body of his slain son.

Very few fragments remain from the lost drama and the trilogy overall, making its reconstruction hard. It is not clear what year the tetralogy premiered or what place it got in the festival, though it seems to have been very popular in antiquity.

== History ==
The Phrygians was part of the lost Achilleis, a tetralogy of three tragedies and one satyr play adapting the events from the Iliad, the seventh-century BC epic poem attributed to Homer. It was the third and final entry of the group, following the Myrmidons and the Nereids. Ancient authors do no actually explicitly attest to a unified grouping of those three plays, or even the title Achilleis, but the existence of such a trilogy centered around Achilles has long been accepted by modern scholars. The Phrygians adapted the final book of the Iliad, in which King Priam goes as a supplicant to Achilles' tent and begs him to be given the body of his dead son Hector (whose murder by Achilles was portrayed in the Nereids), hence the alternative title The Ransoming of Hector.

The Greek spelling of the drama is Phryges, and a medieval catalogue of Aeschylus lists Phryges and Phrygioi as two separate works; Phrygioi, an adjective, was not used as a noun during the fifth century BC, so this could be either a doublet erroneously listed separately or a corruption of a different title (such as Phrygiai, meaning "Phrygian women").

== Plot ==
The drama's took place in front of Achilles' hut, in the Achaeans' camp outside the besieged Troy. From reports we know that Achilles had a short dialogue with the god Hermes (who is probably supplanting Thetis and her role in the part of the Iliad), and that then he sat veiled in silence for a long time, much like he did in the Myrmidons, a paradigm of typical Aeschylean silence.

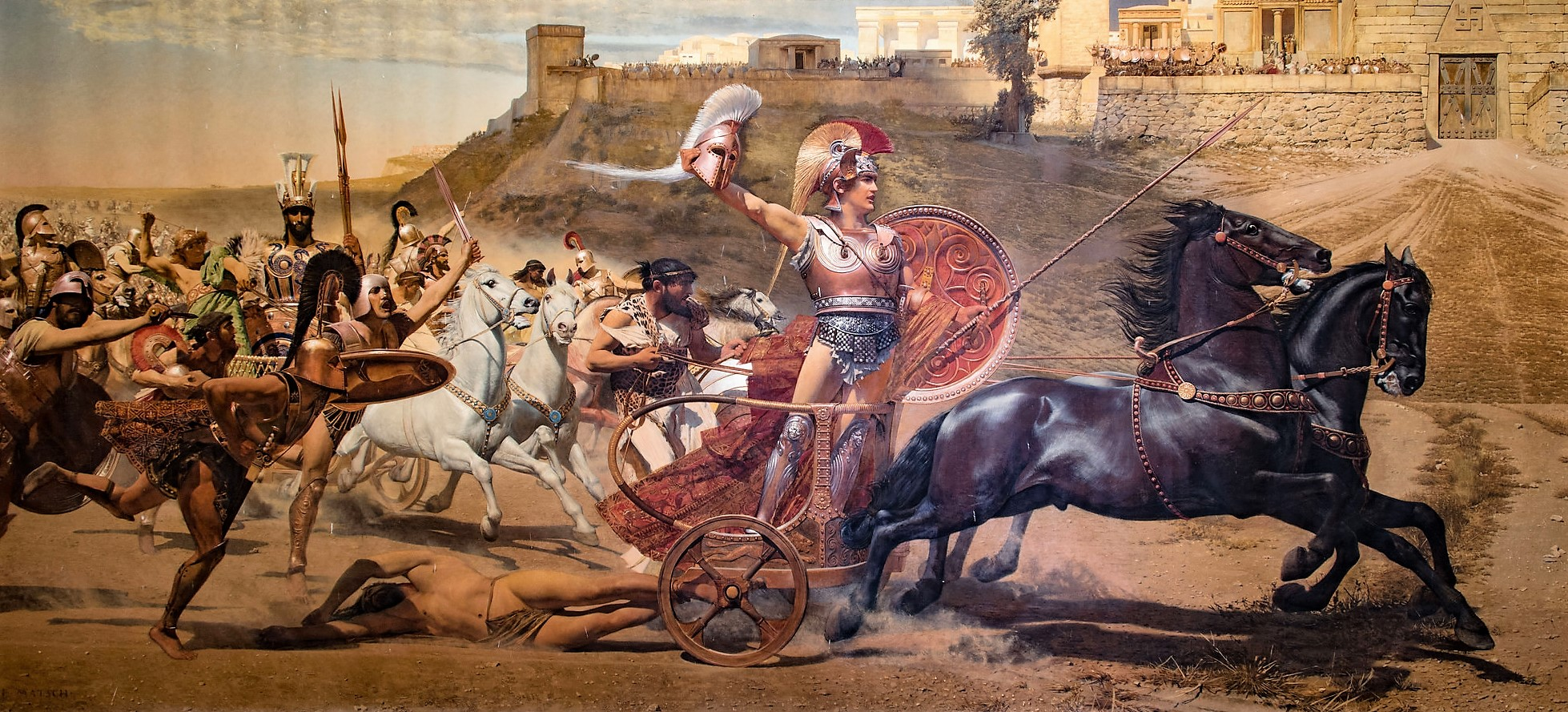
The Triumph of Achilles, 1892 oil on canvas by Franz von Matsch, Achilleion in Corfu, Greece.

The chorus was made up of the titular Phrygians who accompanied Priam (in contrast to the Iliad, where he actually goes alone) and were likely slaves rather than Trojan citizens; the chorus is said to have performed distinct dances. In the Iliad, Achilles famously declared that he would not give up the body even if he was given its weight in gold; Aeschylus is notable for transformating what is epic imagery from the poem into literal reality. In the Phrygians, Hector's body was weighed on stage in the scale against an equal amount of gold that was then paid to Achilles for the release. Giant prop scales would have been used for the scene, large enough to be visible to the audience, as they were for a similar scene from the likewise lost Weighing of the Souls, in which Memnon's soul was judged against Achilles' own by Zeus. The chorus and Priam probably held a lamentation over Hector. The play likely ended with a funeral procession for the fallen prince.

Fragment 267 implies a fourth dramatis persona, identified by a scholiast as Andromache, but the context implies it is a person from the same land as Andromache. It could be Briseis, Achilles' war-prize; it is likely that Briseis persuaded Achilles in some manner, as Patroclus is thought to have done in the Myrmidons. Dionysius I of Syracuse is known to have won in 367 BC at the Lenaea with the Ransoming to Hector, an hommage to Aeschylus; that play featured Andromache, their two sons and Polyxena as characters, but we cannot infer for sure those appeared in Aeschylus' drama as well.

== In ancient culture ==
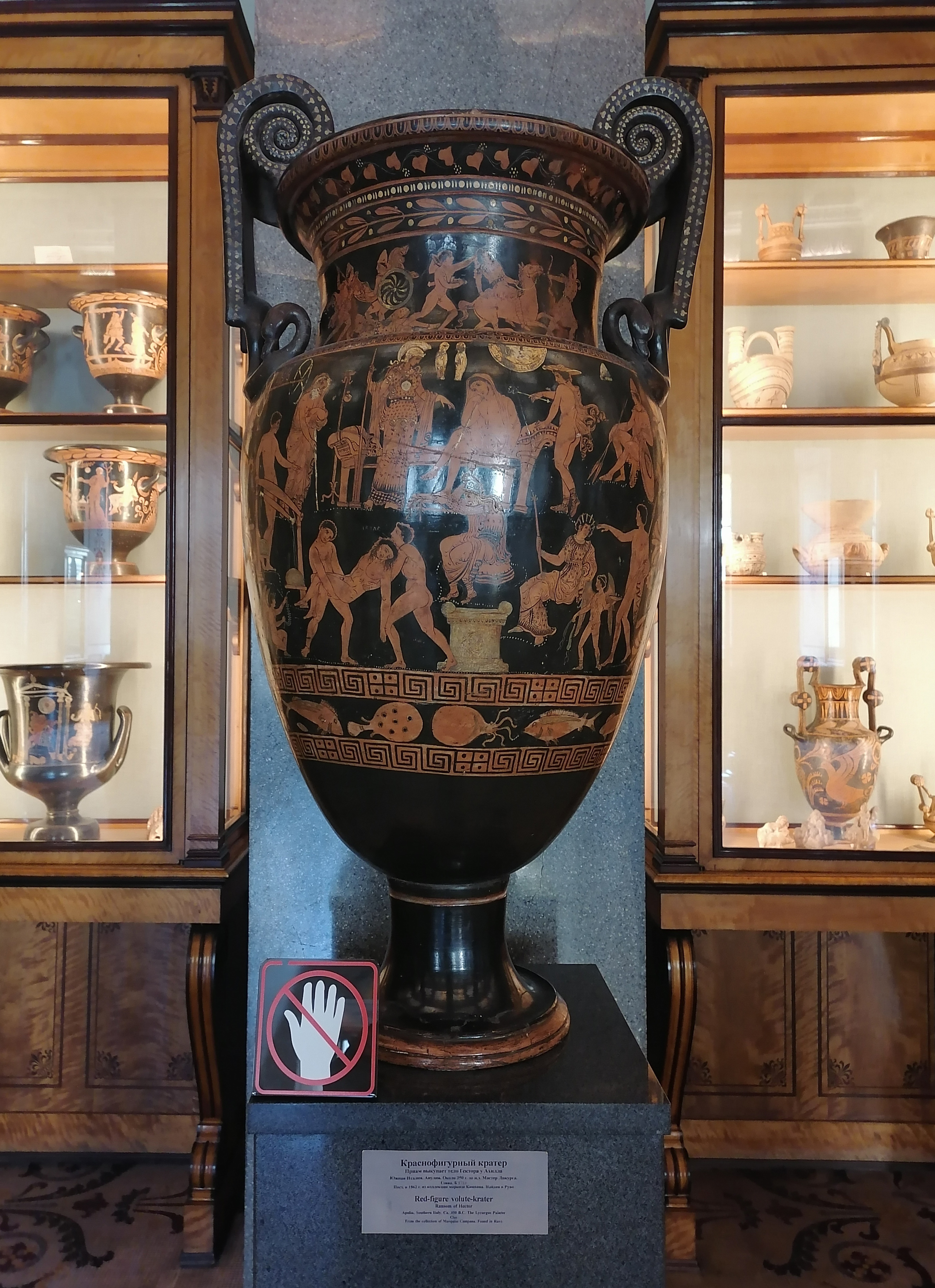
The red-figure Apulian volute krater with the weighing of Hector in the Hermitage Museum.

The use of the giant scales to weigh a warrior parallels another lost play by Aeschylus, the Weighing of the Souls, both due to the extraordinary prop use as well due to both scenes reflecting the central themes of their respective plays, scenes which also had had significant emotional impact on the viewers. The reconciliation between Priam and Achilles creates an episode where the lines between victor and loser, Greek and barbarian are blurred. Whereas the first play of the trilogy dealt with the protagonist's relations with his own community, the other two were about Achilles' relation with outsiders (the divine Nereids and the foreign Trojans); all three choruses bring Achilles something, be it bad news, new weapons or ransom for a fallen warrior.

In his tragedies, Aescylus dramatised moments from the Epic Cycle that were already popular subjects for vase-paintings, so vase depictions of the events from the Iliad are not necessarily inspired by the Achilleis. Nevertheless some examples can be connected to him, demonstrating Aeschylus' success. Two instances can be identified as direct depictions of the Phrygians. An Apulian red-figure volute krater dating to 350 BC and now in the Hermitage State Museum shows Achilles sitting veiled next to Hermes, Athena, Nestor and Antilochus; this does not mean that they were all characters in the play, rather the vase refers to the whole trilogy. Priam is portrayed as a supplicant next to Thetis, dressed in elaborate oriental garment and looking at the lifeless body of his son Hector, carried by assistants to or from the giant scales. A similar fragment from an Apulian calyx krater, less securely associated with this play, shows a kneeling Priam, Hermes and Achilles' elbow.

== See also ==
Other Epic Cycle-inspired plays:

- Rhesus
- Iphigenia at Aulis
- Ajax

== Bibliography ==
- Finglass, P. J. (2023). "Aeschylus, Lyric and Epic". In Bromberg, Jacques A.; Burian, Peter (eds.). A Companion to Aeschylus. Wiley-Blackwell. ISBN 9781405188043.
- Hathorn, Richmond Y. (1967). Crowell's Handbook to Classical Drama. NYC, United States: Thomas Y. Crowell Company. ISBN 0-690-22501-6.
- Homer, The Iliad with an English Translation by A. T. Murray, PhD in two volumes. Cambridge, MA., Harvard University Press; London, William Heinemann, Ltd. 1924. Online version at the Perseus Digital Library.
- Michelakis, Pantelis (2002). Achilles in Greek Tragedy. Cambridge, UK: Cambridge University Press. ISBN 978-0-521-81843-8.
- Radt, Stefan L. (1985). Tragicorum Graecorum Fragmenta (TrGF). Vol. 3: Aeschylus. Göttingen.
- Sommerstein, Alan H. (2009). Aeschylus: Fragments. Loeb Classical Library 505. Cambridge, MA: Harvard University Press. ISBN 978-0-674-99629-8.
- Taplin, Oliver (2007). Pots & Plays: Interactions Between Tragedy and Greek Vase-Painting of the Fourth Century B.C. CA, United States: Getty Publications. ISBN 978-0-89236-807-5.
- Wright, Matthew (2019). The Lost Plays of Greek Tragedy. Vol. 2: Aeschylus, Sophocles and Euripides. London, UK: Bloomsbury Academic. ISBN 978-1-4742-7646-7.
