= Achilleis (trilogy) =

Lost trilogy by Aeschylus, consisting of The Myrmidons, The Nereids, and The Phrygians

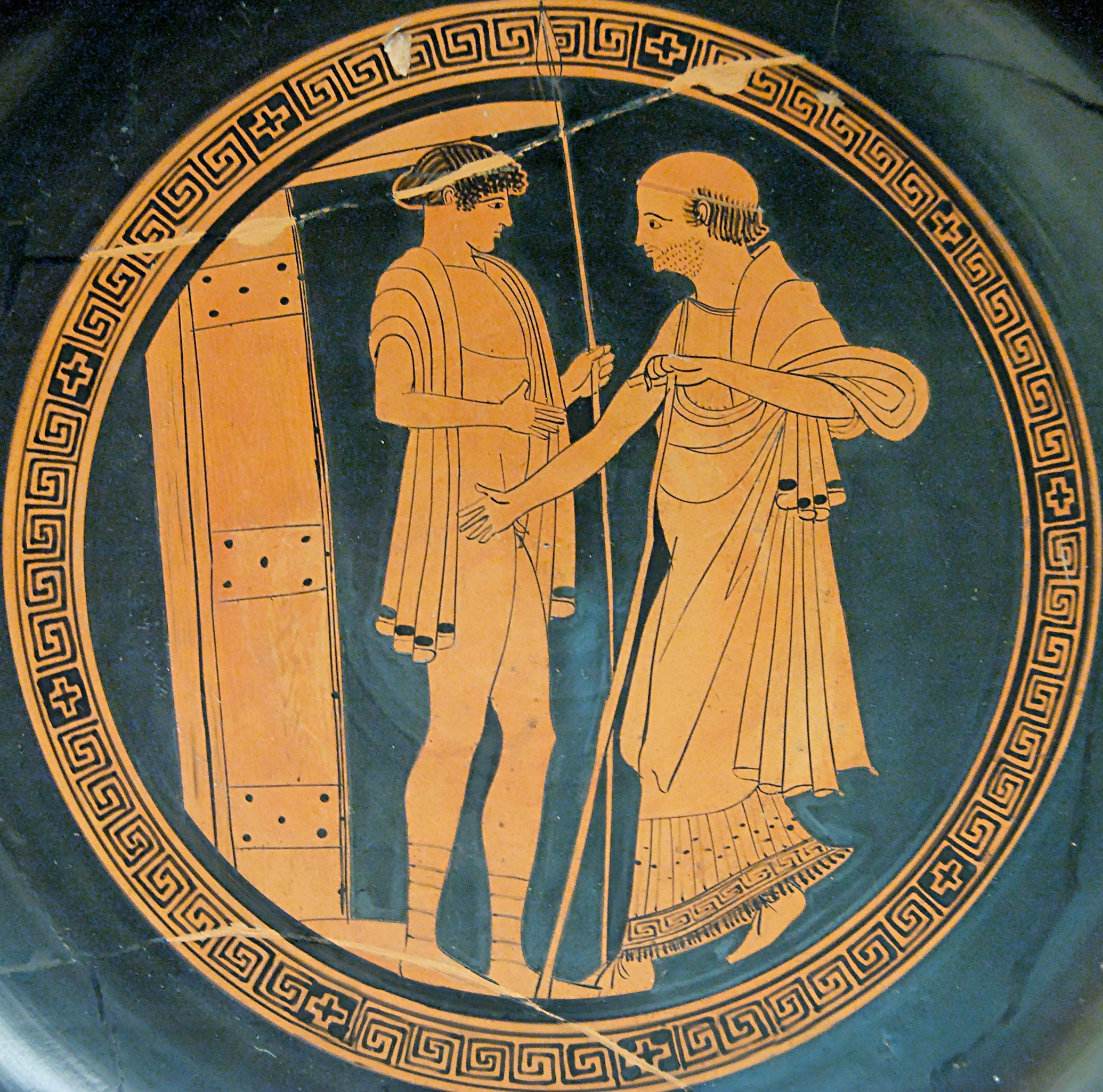
Priam (right) entering the hut of Achilles in his effort to ransom the body of Hector. The figure at left is probably one of Achilles' servant boys. (Attic red-figure kylix of the early fifth century BCE)

The Achilleis (/ˌækɪˈliːɪs/; Ancient Greek Ἀχιλληΐς, Achillēís, pronounced [akʰillɛːís]) is a lost trilogy by the Athenian dramatist Aeschylus. The three plays that make up the Achilleis exist today only in fragments, but aspects of their overall content can be reconstructed with reasonable certainty. Like the Oresteia which forms "a narratively connected unit with a continuous plot," the trilogy had a unified focus, presumably treating the story of Achilles at Troy in a version comparable to the plot of the latter two-thirds of the Iliad.

In the Myrmidons (Μυρμιδόνες, Myrmidónes), Achilles' refusal to fight after his quarrel with Agamemnon led to the death of Patroclus. The title of the play traditionally placed second in the trilogy is the Nereids (Νηρείδες, Nēreídes). The chorus was thus a group of Nereids, and the subject of the play involved Achilles and his Nereid mother Thetis, probably her mourning his imminent death and the acquisition of his new arms. In the Phrygians (Φρύγες, Phrýges) or Ransom of Hector (Ἕκτορος λύτρα, Héktoros lútra), Priam and a chorus of Phrygians sought to retrieve Hector's body from the still wrathful Achilles.

== Historical background ==
Neither the trilogy's title Achilleis nor the grouping of the plays is explicitly attested from antiquity, but the existence of a unified trilogy with Achilles as its focus has long been accepted by modern scholars. In his commentary on The Libation Bearers, Garvie states that it is "highly likely that Aeschylus often, though not always (of the surviving plays Persae is an almost certain exception) composed trilogies consisting of tragedies connected in their subject matter." In addition to the Oresteia (to which 'The Libation Bearers' belongs), the Seven Against Thebes and Suppliants formed part of connected trilogies, as did the lost plays that make up the Lycurgeia. The satyr plays that accompanied these examples had plots related to those of the tragedies, and it has been suggested that the Achilleis might also have been followed by a comedic play related to its dramatic content, but there is no evidence as to what the subject of this satyr play might have been.

Since the Achilleis survives in fragments, its text is comparatively more fluid than that of ancient texts with medieval manuscript traditions. During the first half of the 20th century papyrus fragments of numerous lost Aeschylean plays, including the Myrmidons, were discovered that added much material to, and greatly altered the modern conception of, the dramatist's corpus. Given this fluidity, it is especially important to consult the most current critical edition or translations of the text, since earlier editions will likely not reflect the advances of the past century. In the case of the fragments of Aeschylus, the edition of record is the third volume of Tragicorum Graecorum fragmenta edited by Stefan Radt (1985). While it is now customary to refer to the text and numeration of Radt, the majority of the fragments of the Achilleis can also be found in Mette's 1959 edition. For example, fr. 140 Radt and 232 Mette refer to the same three-word fragment of the Myrmidons, uttered (in Mette's opinion) by Achilles: "Arms! I want arms!" (ὅπλων ὅπλων δεῖ, hóplōn hóplōn deî). Sommerstein's Loeb is the most current English translation and follows the numeration of Radt, as does this article. It is thought by some scholars to be the most impassioned piece of homoerotic literature produced by the ancient world.

== The trilogy ==
Given Aeschylus' tendency to write connected trilogies, three plays attested in the catalogue of his work have been supposed to constitute the Achilleis: Myrmidons, Nereids and Phrygians (alternately titled The Ransoming of Hector). Despite the paucity of surviving text, the Myrmidons has achieved some measure of fame, because of Aristophanes' satire of it at Frogs 911–13 in which Euripides mocks Aeschylus' stagecraft:

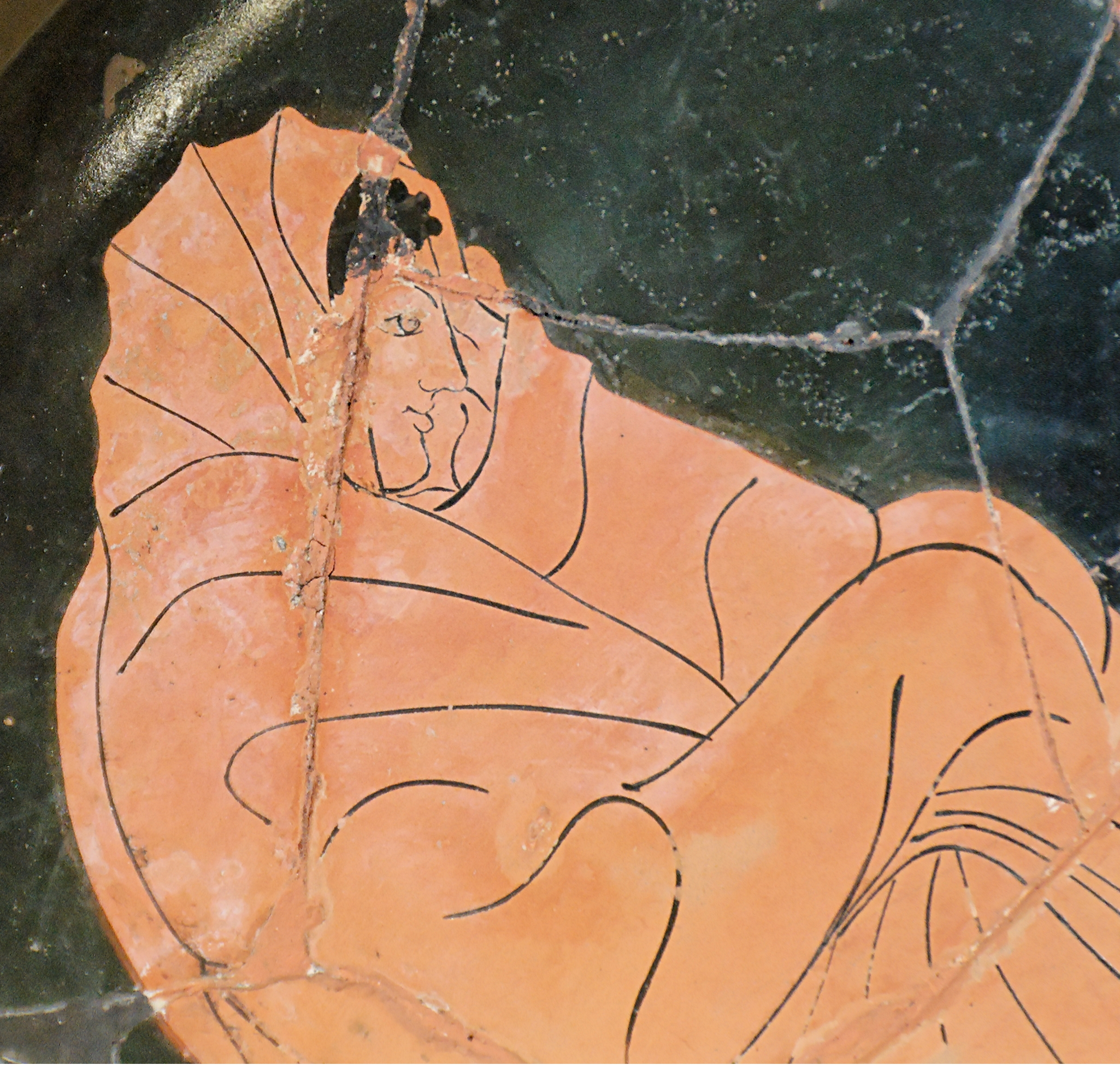
Achilles sulking, taken from a larger scene depicting Book 9 of the Iliad.

πρώτιστα μὲν γὰρ ἕνα τιν' ἂν καθῖσεν ἐγκαλύψας,
Ἀχιλλέα τιν' ἢ Νιόβην, τὸ πρόσωπον οὐχὶ δεικνύς,
πρόσχημα τῆς τραγῳδίας, γρύζοντας οὐδὲ τουτί.

At the very beginning he sits someone alone, enshrouded,
some Achilles or Niobe, not showing the mask,
the ornament of tragedy, mumbling not even this much.

This play, along with the also lost Niobe, are two famous examples cited in antiquity of the often-discussed theme of the "Aeschylean silence".

=== Myrmidons ===
Myrmidons (frr. 131–42 Radt; 211–35 Mette) concerned Achilles' refusal to fight for the Greeks, which tragically leads to the killing of his companion Patroclus by the Trojan hero, Hector; this death persuades Achilles to rejoin the fight.

=== Nereids ===
In Nereids (frr. 150–54 Radt; 236–41 Mette), Thetis and a chorus of sea-nymphs bring Achilles his new armor. The remainder of the action probably would have concerned his revenge killing of Hector and Patroclus' funeral.

=== Phrygians ===
The action of Phrygians (frr. 263–72 Radt; 242–59 Mette) almost certainly corresponded with Book 24 of the Iliad: Achilles' defilement of Hector's corpse and his eventually agreeing to ransom the body back to the grieving father, Priam.

== The text ==
A small number of verses from these three of Aeschylus' lost works have been saved: fifty-four from Myrmidons, seven from Nereids and twenty-one from Phrygians. A sense of the pace at which additions to this corpus are made can be gleaned from the fact that a papyrus fragment containing seven letters on three lines that could be fitted over a two-line quote from Justin Martyr's dialogue Trypho, to show that the quote was in fact from the opening of Myrmidons was worth publishing in a note in Classical Philology, 1971.

== Modern adaptation ==
The Achilleis and the circumstances of its transmission came to broader public notice in 2003 when ThoC, Cyprus' national theatre, announced that it would be staging an adaptation (by way of creative reconstruction) of the trilogy by Elias Malandris. Malandris' Achilleis, on which he had worked for more than a decade, built upon classicist Bruno Snell's work on the fragments and filled out their content with material adapted from the Iliad and other ancient references to Achilles. On the process of staging a largely lost work of ancient tragedy, Andy Bargilly, then director of the Theatre, stated: "We do think it is a faithful adaptation to a large extent, but nobody can say 100 percent." The reconstructed trilogy premiered July 7, 2004, with Mario Frangoulis as Achilles.

== Editions and translations ==
=== Critical editions ===
- Mette, H.J. (1959) Die Fragmente der Tragödien des Aischylos (Berlin). Critical edition of the Greek.
- Radt, S. (1985) Tragicorum Graecorum fragmenta, vol. 3. (Göttingen). ISBN 978-3-525-25745-6. Critical edition of the Greek.
- Diggle, J. (1998) Tragicorum Graecorum fragmenta selecta, Oxford Classical Texts (Oxford). ISBN 978-0-19-814685-8. Critical edition including select fragments of the Myrmidones.

=== Translations ===
- Smyth, H.W. (1926) Aeschylus II, Loeb Classical Library no. 146 (London). Greek text with translation of select fragments known before 1926; the text of the fragments is superseded by Lloyd-Jones (1957) and, in turn, Sommerstein (2009).
- Lloyd-Jones, H. (1957) "Appendix" to the reprint of Smyth (1926), including text and translation of most papyrus fragments; now largely superseded by Sommerstein (2009).
- Sommerstein, A. (2009) Aeschylus III: Fragments, Loeb Classical Library no. 505 (Cambridge, MA). ISBN 978-0-674-99629-8. Greek text with facing translation of fragments "containing at least one complete line, or two connected half-lines" (p. ix).

== Bibliography ==
- Fitzpatrick, D. (2003). "Achilles in Greek Tragedy – Bryn Mawr Classical Review". Bryn Mawr Classical Review. 20.
- Gantz, T. (1979) "The Aischylean Tetralogy: Prolegomena", The Classical Journal 74: 289–304.
- Gantz, T. (1980) "The Aischylean Tetralogy: Attested and Conjectured Groups", The American Journal of Philology 101: 133–64.
- Garvie, A.F. (1986) Aeschylus: Choephori (Oxford). ISBN 0-19-872134-X
- Gregory, J. (2005) A Companion to Greek Tragedy. Wiley-Blackwell ISBN 1-4051-0770-7, ISBN 978-1-4051-0770-9.
- Michelakis, P. (1999) "The Spring Before It Is Sprung: visual and non-verbal aspects of power struggle in Aeschylus' Myrmidons", conference paper delivered at the January 1999 conference Theatre: Ancient and Modern at the Open University.
- Michelakis, P. (2002) Achilles in Greek Tragedy (Cambridge: Cambridge University Press). ISBN 0-521-81843-5, especially chapter 2, "The Problematic Hero: Aeschylus' Myrmidons", pages 22–57.
- Smethurst, M. (1971) "Aeschylus' Myrmidons (Frag. 224 Mette)", Classical Philology 66: 112.
- Smethurst, M. (1974) "A Repetition in the Myrmidons of Aeschylus", Mnemosyne 27: 67–69.
- Wecklein, N. (1891) "Ueber eine Trilogie des Aischylos und über die Trilogie überhaupt", Sitzungsberichte der philosophisch-philologishen Classe der k.b. Akademie der Wissenschaften Jahrgang 1891: 327–85.
- Welcker, F.G. (1824) Die aeschylische Trilogie Prometheus (Darmstadt).
- West, M.L. (2000) "Iliad and Aethiopis on the Stage: Aeschylus and Son", Classical Quarterly 50: 338–52.
