= Lycurgeia =

Lost tetralogy by Aeschylus

The Lycurgeia (Ancient Greek: Λυκούργεια, Lykoúrgeia) is a lost tetralogy by the Athenian dramatist Aeschylus that concerned Thracian Lycurgus' conflict with Dionysus and its aftermath. The four plays that made up the Lycurgeia survive only in fragments quoted by ancient authors, and the reconstruction of much of their content is a matter of conjecture. In the Edoni (Ἠδωνοί, Ēdōnoí), Dionysus presumably arrived in Thrace where King Lycurgus attempted to suppress the worship of the new god. The second play, the Bassarids (Βασσαρίδες, Bassarídes), is supposed to have treated the death of Orpheus at the hands of Thracian women in the thrall of Dionysus. Very little is known of the third play, the Youths (Νεανισκοί, Neaniskoí), but M.L. West has proposed that it culminated in the acceptance of the cult of Dionysus in Thrace. The satyr play was named Lycurgus (Λυκοῦργος, Lykoûrgos) after the king and might have presented his attempt to domesticate the satyrs, civilizing their bestial nature and forcing them to perform at his feasts in "honour not of Dionysus, but of himself and Ares."

== Bibliography ==
- Gantz, T. (1980) "The Aischylean Tetralogy: Attested and Conjectured Groups", The American Journal of Philology 101: 133–64.
- Sommerstein, A. (2009) Aeschylus III: Fragments, Loeb Classical Library no. 505 (Cambridge, MA). ISBN 978-0-674-99629-8.
- West, M.L. (1990) Studies in Aeschylus (Stuttgart)
