= Anthony Podlecki =

Classical scholar (1936–2023)

Anthony Joseph Podlecki
- Born: 25 January 1936; Buffalo, United States
- Died: 31 July 2023 (aged 87); Vancouver, Canada
- Spouse: Jennifer Julia Grube (m. 1962)

Academic background
- Education: College of the Holy Cross (AB); Lincoln College, Oxford (BA); University of Toronto (MA, PhD)
- Thesis: The Political Background of Aeschylean Tragedy (1963)
- Doctoral advisor: Desmond Conacher

Academic work
- Discipline: Classics
- Sub-discipline: Ancient Greek literature
- Institutions: Northwestern University; Pennsylvania State University; University of British Columbia

Anthony Joseph Podlecki (25 January 1936 – 31 July 2023) was an American classical scholar, known primarily for his work on Greek tragedy and its political context in classical Athens.

== Biography ==
Podlecki was born in Buffalo, New York, on 25 January 1936. After being educated at Canisius High School in Buffalo, he studied at the College of the Holy Cross, obtaining his AB in 1957. He then studied at Lincoln College, Oxford as a Fulbright Scholar, obtaining his BA in 1960. At Oxford, he was taught by George Forrest, whose ideas about Aeschylus formed the basis for his doctoral research. He then studied at the University of Toronto, obtaining his MA in 1961 and his doctorate in 1963. His doctoral thesis, written under the supervision of Desmond Conacher, concerned the political background to the tragedies of Aeschylus. A revised version of this thesis was published as a book in 1966.

In July 1962, while studying in Toronto, Podlecki married Jennifer Julia Grube, the daughter of the classical scholar George Grube. They remained married until Podlecki's death, and had a son and two daughters.

From 1963 to 1966, Podlecki was an instructional and then an assistant professor at Northwestern University. He then moved to Pennsylvania State University, as chair of a two-person classics department, which he was instrumental in expanding and developing. In 1975, he moved to the University of British Columbia, serving as head of the classics department from then until 1986, and serving as a professor until his retirement in 1998.

As an emeritus professor, Podlecki also held visiting professorships at Swarthmore College, Nancy and Grenoble. In 2015, he was honoured with two sessions of papers in his honour and a dinner at the annual meeting of the Classical Association of Canada, leading to the publication of a special issue of Mouseion in his honour.

Podlecki died in Vancouver on 31 July 2023.

== Selected publications ==
- Podlecki, Anthony J. (1966). The Political Background of Aeschylean Tragedy. University of Michigan Press.
- Podlecki, Anthony J. (1975). The Life of Themistocles: A Critical Survey of the Literary and Archaeological Evidence. McGill-Queen's University Press. ISBN 9780773501850.
- Podlecki, Anthony J. (1984). The Early Greek Poets and Their Times. University of British Columbia Press. ISBN 9780774801935.
- Podlecki, Anthony J. (1998). Pericles and His Circle. Routledge. ISBN 9780415067942.
- Podlecki, Anthony J. (2005). Aeschylus: Prometheus Bound. Aris and Phillips. ISBN 9780856684715.
