= Women of Colchis =

Lost tragedy by Sophocles

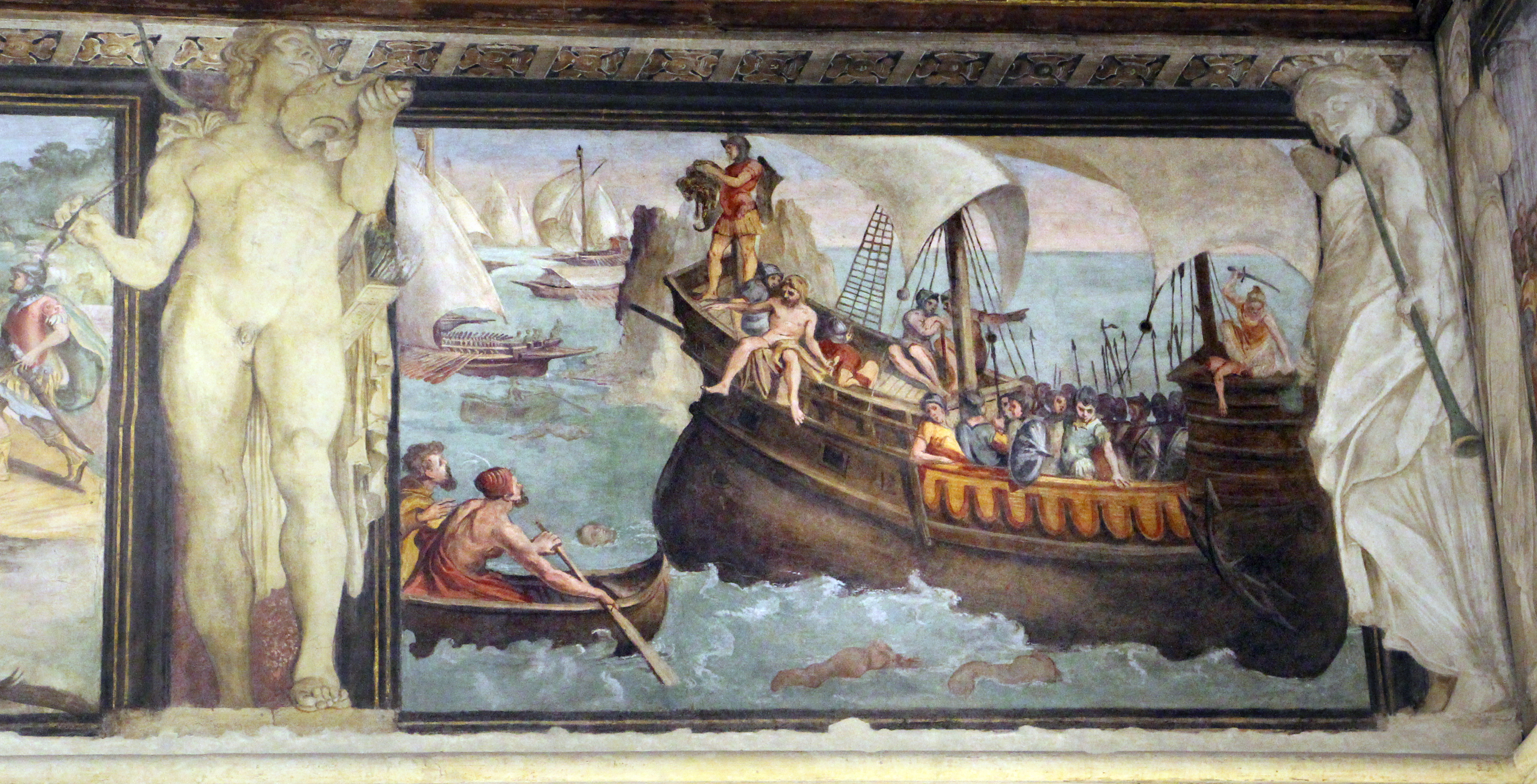
- Medea dismembering Absyrtus, 1584 fresco in Palazzo Fava
- Original language: Ancient Greek
- Written by: Sophocles
- Chorus: Colchian women
- Characters: Medea; Jason; Aeëtes; Messenger
- Subject: Jason's quest for the Golden Fleece
- Genre: Greek tragedy
- Setting: Colchis

Premiere
- Date: 5^{th} century BC
- Place: Athens

The Women of Colchis or Colchides (Ancient Greek: Κολχίδες) is an ancient Greek lost tragedy by the Athenian dramatist Sophocles, written some time during the fifth century BC. The play is lost but for few fragments that do not give a definite view of the drama's contents and plot. It is known that it featured Medea, Jason and their efforts to obtain the legendary Golden Fleece from Medea's father, the king Aeëtes, keeper of the fleece.

It is not known what year it was produced in, what festival it competed in, which plays accompanied and what position it took.

== Mythological background ==
The hero Jason was tasked with obtaining the legendary Golden Fleece, kept by king Aeëtes in his kingdom Aea. Jason gathered a number of heroes, collectively known as the Argonauts, and sailed to faraway Aea in the land of Colchis where Aeëtes ordered him to accomplish impossible tasks in order to get the fleece. Aeëtes' young daughter Medea fell in love with Jason, so she helped him get the fleece and fled together with him.

Although much about the journey of Jason and the Argonauts and their adventures in Colchis is based on their portrayal in the Hellenistic epic poem Argonautica by Apollonius Rhodius, the Women of Colchis predates that work. Judging from the number of times scholiasts on the Argonautica reference this play, it can be concluded that it was a major source for Apollonius. Seven fragments survive from this play. It is one of the three or four Sophoclean and twenty in total confirmed tragedies where Medea appeared as a character.

== Plot ==
Medea and Absyrtus on a 3rd-century Roman mosaic from Antioch, now in the Hatay Archaeology Museum.

Due to the small number of fragments that can be assigned to this drama, the plot and structure of the tragedy cannot be satisfyingly reconstructed. It is known that it dramatised the events of Jason's arrival at Colchis in search of the Golden Fleece, culminating to the capture of the treasure and the Argonauts' flight. The tragedy's title shows that the chorus was made up of Colchian women. A scholiast on Apollonius Rhodius says that in the play Medea met with Jason and gave him advice on how to succeed in the trials that he would be put through. Fragment 339 must surely have come from their dialogue; Medea asks him if he swears to return the favour with another (i.e. marriage). The fragment does not make clear if Medea's motive is love for Jason, but no other motive has ever been put forward by ancient sources; it is also unclear whether Medea informs him exactly what sort of favour she will ask in return. Sophocles fr. 941, not attributed to any of his plays, features a woman talking to a female chorus about the devastating power of Aphrodite who rules over mortals and immortals both; Ahrens and Sommerstein believe this is Medea from the Women of Colchis talking.

It is not known how Medea's witchcraft and spells were presented in Women of Colchis, if at all; Fragment 340 seems to be a reference to the prometheum, the protective herb she gives to Jason in the later epic Argonautica. Fragment 341 features a dialogue between Aeëtes and a messenger asking whether the Spartoi, the teeth-sown warriors, sprouted or not and the messenger confirming that indeed they did, with plumed helmets and arms of bronze.

A different scholium on Apollonius confirms the murder of Medea's brother Absyrtus, presented as a small child in this play. Unlike in the Argonautica and other later versions (where an older Absyrtus is killed at sea while pursuing the fleeing Medea and Jason), in Sophocles the boy was killed inside the palace, perhaps as the tragedy's dramatic climax. The scene of the murder being the palace points to Medea being the sole perpetrator of the crime, although she could still be acting on Jason's instructions. In Apollonius this was done to delay Aeëtes, and was probably the case as well for the Women of Colchis. The choice was likely made to reinforce Medea's image as a child-killer.

== See also ==
Other Greek tragedies featuring child murder:

- Medea
- Tereus
- Iphigenia at Aulis

== Bibliography ==
- Gantz, Timothy (1993). Early Greek Myth: A Guide to Literary and Artistic Sources. Vol. I. Johns Hopkins University Press. ISBN 978-0-8018-5360-9.
- Grimal, Pierre (1987). The Dictionary of Classical Mythology. Wiley-Blackwell. ISBN 0-631-13209-0.
- Hathorn, Richmond Y. (1967). Crowell's Handbook to Classical Drama. NYC, United States: Thomas Y. Crowell Company. ISBN 0-690-22501-6.
- Lloyd-Jones, Hugh (1996). Sophocles: Fragments. Loeb Classical Library 483. Cambridge, MA: Harvard University Press. ISBN 978-0-674-99532-1.
- Radt, Stefan L. (1985). Tragicorum Graecorum Fragmenta (TrGF). Vol. IV: Sophocles. Göttingen.
- Schmitz, Leonhard (1867). Smith, William (ed.). A Dictionary of Greek and Roman Biography and Mythology. London, UK: John Murray, printed by Spottiswoode and Co. Online version at the Perseus.tufts library.
- Sommerstein, Alan H. (2020). "Women in Love in the Fragmentary Plays of Sophocles". In Finglass, Patrick J.; Coo, Lyndsay (eds.). Female Characters in Fragmentary Greek Tragedy. Cambridge University Press. doi:10.1017/9781108861199. ISBN 9781108861199.
- Sutton, Dana F. (1984). The Lost Sophocles. University Press of America. ISBN 0-8191-4030-9.
- Wright, Matthew (2019). The Lost Plays of Greek Tragedy. Vol. 2: Aeschylus, Sophocles and Euripides. London, UK: Bloomsbury Academic. ISBN 978-1-4742-7646-7.
