= Mouseion (journal) =

- Discipline: Classical Studies
- Language: English
- Edited by: Peter O'Brien, Kathryn Simonsen

Publication details
- Former name(s): Échos du monde classique; Classical Views
- History: 1956–present
- Publisher: University of Toronto Press (Canada)
- Frequency: Triannual

Standard abbreviations
- ISO 4: Mouseion

Indexing
- ISSN: 1496-9343 (print); 1913-5416 (web)

Links
- Journal homepage

Mouseion (formerly Échos du Monde Classique or Classical Views prior to 2001), is a peer-reviewed academic journal of the Classical Association of Canada publishing research in the field of classical studies, including archaeological studies, philology, pedagogy, history, and philosophy. It is published three times a year by the University of Toronto Press in English and French, with occasional Greek and Latin translations.

== Abstracting and indexing ==
The journal is abstracted and indexed in:

- Art Source
- Emerging Sources Citation Index
- IBZ Online
- International Bibliography of the Social Sciences
- L'Année philologique
- Modern Language Association Database
- Project MUSE
