= Daniel Jones =

Daniel Jones may refer to:

== In the arts ==
- Daniel Jones (composer) (1912–1993), Welsh composer
- Daniel Jones (dancer), English National Ballet
- Daniel Jones (guitarist) (born 1961), American musician, member of 7th Order
- Daniel Jones (musician) (born 1973), Australian musician, member of Savage Garden
- Daniel Alexander Jones (born 1970), American performance artist, playwright, director, essayist and educator
- Daniel T. Jones (author), English author and researcher

== In sports ==
- Daniel Jones (footballer) (born 1986), English footballer for Bray Wanderers
- Dan Jones (footballer, born 1994), English footballer for Port Vale
- Daniel Jones (rugby union) (1875–1959), Wales international rugby union player
- Daniel Jones (American football) (born 1997), American football player
- Chip Jones (Daniel Jones, born 1979), Dutch basketball player

== Other people ==
- Daniel Jones (phonetician) (1881–1967), British phonetician, author of The Pronunciation of English
- Daniel Jones (chancellor) (born 1949), American former chancellor of the University of Mississippi
- Daniel Jones (minister) (1830–1891), Methodist Episcopal minister
- Daniel Webster Jones (governor) (1839–1918), governor of Arkansas
- Daniel Webster Jones (Mormon) (1830–1915), Latter-day Saint pioneer, colonizer, translator, and author
- Daniel W. Jones (politician) (1945–2026), member of the New Hampshire House of Representatives
- Daniel T. Jones (politician) (1800–1861), U.S. representative from New York
- Daniel V. Jones (1958–1998), American man who committed suicide on live television
- Daniel Jones (British Army officer) (died 1793)
- Daniel J. Jones, researcher and investigator for the U.S. Senate and the FBI
- Daniel O. Jones (born 1969), American serial killer
- Daniel L. Jones (fl. 1852–1854), member of the Illinois House of Representatives
- Daniel Jones (born 1955), a perpetrator of the 2015 Hatton Garden safe deposit burglary

== See also ==
- Dan Jones (disambiguation)
- Danny Jones (disambiguation)
- Jones (surname)
