= John Pemberton =

John Pemberton may refer to:

- John Stith Pemberton (1831–1888), American druggist and the inventor of Coca-Cola
- John Pemberton (Illinois politician), 19th century Illinois state representative
- John (Jack) Pemberton (1883–1968), Australian footballer
- John Pemberton (physician) (1912–2010), British epidemiologist
- John Pemberton (footballer) (born 1964), English footballer and manager
- John Pemberton (anthropologist), faculty member at Columbia University
- John C. Pemberton (1814–1881), Confederate Civil War general
- John Stapylton Grey Pemberton (1860–1940), British member of parliament for Sunderland, 1900–1906
- Johnny Pemberton (born 1981), American actor and comedian
