= Dan Jones =

Dan Jones may refer to:

== Football players ==
- Dan Jones (American football) (born 1970), American football player
- Dan Jones (New Zealand footballer), New Zealand international footballer
- Dan Jones (footballer, born 1994), British professional footballer for Port Vale
- Dan Jones (rugby union, born 1996), Welsh rugby player
- Dan Jones (rugby union, born 1907) (1907–1988), Welsh rugby union player

== Other people ==
- Dan Jones (Mormon) (1810–1862), Welsh-American Latter-day Saint missionary, sailor, and pioneer
- Dan Jones (politician) (1908–1985), British politician, MP for Burnley 1959–1983
- Dan Jones (composer), British composer and sound designer
- Dan Jones (writer) (born 1981), British writer, historian and journalist
- Dan Jones (professor) (born 1952), American writer and professor
- Dan Jones (digital creative director) (born 1979), British creative director, digital producer and television producer
- Dan E. Jones, American educator and political pollster
- Dan Jones (human rights education activist) (born 1940), British artist, collector of children's playground songs and human rights campaigner
- D.A.N. Jones (1931–2002), British novelist and journalist, theatre and literature critic

== Fictional characters ==
- Dan Jones (Madonsela Mpho), fictional child character in Shining Time Station

== See also ==
- Daniel Jones (disambiguation)
- Danny Jones (disambiguation)
- Jones (surname)
