= Maverick Television =

Defunct television and media production company

- Type: Subsidiary
- Industry: Television; Media
- Founded: 1994; 32 years ago
- Parent: All3Media (2007–2026); Banijay UK (2026–present)
- Website: www.mavericktv.co.uk

Maverick Television was a British and later American television and media production company that was a subsidiary of Banijay UK, the company was primarily known for factual and reality programming.

Notable Maverick programmes include the health brand Embarrassing Bodies, the make-over shows 10 Years Younger and How to Look Good Naked, and the documentary series Stephen Fry: Out There and Growing Up Down's. Maverick is particularly well known for its multi-platform projects: developing apps, websites and YouTube channels in conjunction with its TV content.

On 21 June 2007, independent production and distribution company All3Media had brought Maverick Television for an undisclosed sum, making Maverick Television a subsidiary of the. Maverick has offices in Birmingham, London and Los Angeles.

In April 2012, Maverick Television had expanded its operations into the United States with the launch of its American production division based in Los Angeles entitled Maverick Television USA as Maverick Television had upped its managing director Jim Sayer and ita creative director Alexandra Fraser to become CEOs of the company while the new American division had appointed Adam Greener to head Maverick's new American operation that would produce programming and adapt Maverick's formats for the region.

Five months later on 26 September of that year, Maverick Television under its multi-platform unit partnered with All3Media's fellow comedy entertainment production subsidiary Objective Productions via its Scottish division Objective Productions Scotland to develop Fresh Meat House for Channel 4's education arm Channel 4 Education to provide additional digital content, when Fresh Meat (a production from Objective Productions and fellow All3Media subsidiary Lime Pictures) was renewed for a second series.

In August 2022, Maverick Television's parent All3Media had merged Maverick Television's London-based British ptoduction unit into All3Media's fellow subsidiary Objective Media Group via its Glasgow-based Scottish production division Objective Media Group Scotland as Objective had formed a new production label based in OMG Scotland's Glasgow office named 141 Productions which will take over Maverick's London office with Maverick Television UK's Creative Director Hannah Brownhill and Toby Stevens, head of OMG's Scottish division OMG Scotland, would run the new production label however Maverick Television retained its American production arm as it turned into an American subsidiary

In August 2024, two years after Maverick Television's British production division was transferrered to All3Media's fellow subsidiary Objective Media Group under the latter's Scottish division Objective Media Group Scotland, Maverick Television's parent All3Media had shuttered Maverick Television's American production operations and its American division Maverick Television USA retiring the Maverick Television name after with Simon Knight depaturing.

In July 2026, Banijay Entertainment merged with All3Media, and Maverick Television effectively became part of Banijay UK.

== Television shows ==
Maverick Television mainly produces factual and factual-entertainment shows.

=== Embarrassing Bodies ===
Embarrassing Bodies is a reality medical series broadcast by Channel 4. It is presented by a team of doctors who look to help people with 'embarrassing' body parts and so de-stigmatise medical conditions. Each series has its own health awareness agenda. In July 2014, the seventh series of Embarrassing Bodies began airing.

=== Operation Ouch! ===
Operation Ouch! is a factual entertainment show for kids about the human body. It is presented by identical twins Dr. Chris and Dr. Xand Van Tulleken and broadcast on CBBC.

=== Growing Up Down's ===
Growing Up Down's is a one-hour documentary which follows a theatre troupe of young adults with Down's as they put together a touring production of Hamlet. For TV critic Keith Watson, the acting troupe was "in the perfect position to relate to 'the slings and arrows of outrageous fortune'". Growing Up Down's was produced and directed by Will Jessop, the brother of Tommy Jessop who plays Hamlet, and broadcast by BBC Three in February 2014.

=== The Model Agency ===
The Model Agency is a seven part observational documentary series that follows the dramas of Premier Model Management, a world-famous model agency based in London.

The series sought the insights of both agency staff and the models signed with them. It covered such events as the attempts to launch the careers of two new models during New York Fashion week and the agency's preparation for London Fashion Week. In the final episode, Premier staff reflect on their experiences of being caught up in the 2010 Blood Diamond scandal; Carole White, Premier's co-founder, also reflects on her relationship with Naomi Campbell, who first signed for the agency.

Channel 4 claims that The Model Agency was filmed by a multi-camera documentary rig that was used in a commercial environment for the first time. The series was broadcast by Channel 4 in February–April 2011.

=== Chrisley Knows Best ===
Chrisley Knows Best marked Maverick's first major American TV series; broadcast on the USA Network. Chrisley is a reality TV series that follows the lives of multi-millionaire Todd Chrisley, his wife Julie and their family. The final episode of the first series clocked an estimated 1.5 million viewers and was broadcast in April 2014. It is notable for having a young audience.

In June 2022, Todd and Julie Chrisley were convicted on federal counts of bank fraud and tax evasion, as well as submitting false documents to banks in order to obtain loans and fund their lavish lifestyle. In November 2022, the couple was sentenced to a combined 19 years in prison, with the show being canceled as a result.

=== Born This Way ===
In 2015, Channel 4 is set to broadcast Born This Way, a series in which Dr. Dawn Harper and Dr. Ravi Jayaram investigate the medical and behavioural causes for the conduct of children brought to the show by worried parents.

=== TV titles ===
Dinosaur Britain – ITV

Embarrassing Bodies – Channel 4
Embarrassing Bodies: Live from the Clinic – Channel 4
Chrisley Knows Best – USA Network
Your Style in His Hands – Discovery TLC
Operation Ouch! – CBBC
Party Wright Around the World – ITV2
Growing Up Down's – BBC Three
Gok Does Panto – Channel 4
Long Live Britain – BBC One
Last Chance Salon – Discovery TLC
Stephen Fry: Out There – BBC Two
Was It Something I Said? – Channel 4
Nurses – Channel 5
Billy Connolly's Route 66 – ITV
The Model Agency – Channel 4
Kids With Tourette's: In Their Own Words – ITV1
My Naked Secret – Discovery TLC
Island Hotel – ITV1
Superhuman Showdown – Discovery
Get The Look – Disney
My Child's Not Perfect – ITV1
How to Live Longer – BBC One
Britain's Next Big Thing – BBC Two
Animal Madhouse – Channel 4
Home For Life – BBC One
Bizarre ER – BBC Three
Children's Hospital – ITV1
Bizarre Crime – BBC Three
Bizarre Animal ER – BBC Three
Safebreakers – Sky1
My Naked Secret – Discovery
My Super Sweet – MTV
Sectioned – BBC Four
Living Dangerously BBC One
Miss Naked Beauty – Channel 4
The Shooting Party – Channel 4
New Shoots – Channel 4
Vee TV – Channel 4
Trade Secrets – BBC Two
ONE Life: Gail Porter Laid Bare – BBC One
Who'll Age Worst – UKTV

Have You Got The Balls? – BBC One

Ai Trúng Số Độc Đắc? - HanoiTV1

== Multiplatform ==
Headed by Dan Jones, Maverick's multiplatform products and innovations have won 4 BAFTAs, an Emmy, 5 Royal Television Society Awards, 2 Broadcast Digital Awards, 2 British Interactive Media Association awards, and a World Media Award. Multiplatform refers to the distribution of content across a range of media outlets and also to the development of the content for each of those outlets.

Maverick's involvement with the project A Field in England is a good example. The film was distributed in cinemas, on TV, online and on DVD, all on the same day in July 2013; the film was developed alongside an online "Digital Masterclass" which included extra videos, unedited rushes, available production documents, a crew who's-who list, a step-by-step guide to the advertising poster's development, commentaries from the creative team, a glossary of terms and a historical A-Z of the film's setting. As a result of these additional online developments, the film was able to be used both as entertainment content and as a very thorough educational resource for film-makers in training.

=== Apps ===
Maverick Television has launched a number of apps for download and use on tablets and smart phones. In conjunction with the TV series Embarrassing Bodies, Maverick has launched a suite of health apps: My HealthChecker, My MoleChecker, My SelfChecker, My RiskChecker and My MindChecker. In various way, the apps allow users to test their health, better positioning them to know whether they need to change lifestyle, visit a doctor or relax about what they perceive as symptoms. The data, collected anonymously, is also used to better inform researchers about public health trends. In addition to these medical tester apps, Maverick released a game app in 2014 in association with the same TV series called Angry Boils.

Maverick developed Reverse The Odds, a free puzzle game, with Chunk Digital for Channel 4. the game is a partnership with Cancer Research UK and Zooniverse. The smartphone game aids in the work of Cancer Research UK by analysing real cancer slides as they progress through the game story. The more people play the game, and the longer they play for, the more Cancer Research UK's scientists are helped. In April 2015 the game won the 'Digital Program: Children & Young People’ category in the 2015 International Digital Emmys at MIPTV's Opening night festivities in Cannes. The game was nominated in the Digital Creativity category of the 2015 Television Craft BAFTAs as well as being on the official Shortlist for the 2015 Cannes Lions and winning Best Game and Best Content Partnership at the Broadcast Digital Awards 2015. Since it launched in October 2014 over 3 million slides have been analysed by players across the globe. The game was highlighted as an example of best practice by Baroness Martha Lane-Fox as part of the 2015 Dimbleby Lecture on BBC One.

=== Social media ===
Maverick has also developed TV content best suited to the uptake of social media.

Was It Something I Said?, a comedy panel game, was the first TV programme derived solely from a Channel 4 online commission. The content for the questions was based around quotations provided to the show by the users of the website Quotables while the game could also be played via Twitter where the questions for the panel were also uploaded for Twitter users to answer without leaving their social media stream. Users of the Quotables website could contribute to the content of the panel show while users of Twitter received a scorecard which in turn led to online extras, such as extra videos from host David Mitchell. Finally, funny moments from the show were released in GIF form through Tumblr for re-blogging.

Mahagonny was a project for Sky Arts designed to run alongside the opera run of Rise and Fall of the City of Mahagonny at the Olympia Theatre, Dublin. Maverick created a parallel-running storyline with two new characters which unfolded across a range of social media websites and fictional webpages.

=== Embarrassing Bodies Online ===
"Embarrassing Bodies Online" is a BAFTA-winning interactive website which offers a host of health information through networked video, games, applications as well as through easy-to-understand guides. The website has generated over 250 million page views from 25 million users; its videos have received 10 million views on the website (and a further 100 million views through YouTube).

=== YouTube channels ===
Maverick has developed a number of YouTube channels:

The You Generation

The You Generation is a global online talent hunt, fronted by Simon Cowell and featuring a number of YouTube stars and celebrities.

Daily Mix

On Daily Mix, YouTube stars host videos offering a range of formats from beauty and make up to challenges and giveaways.

Body Talk

Body Talk is channel skewed towards young women and includes dating, sex advice, healthy eating recipes, celebrity chat, fitness, health advice, parenting, food for kids, yoga and pilates.
