= Oller =

Oller (Eastern Catalan: [uˈʎe]) is a common surname in the Catalan language. Variants are Ollé and Olle. Notable people with the surname include:

- Adam Oller (born 1994), American baseball player
- Denisse Oller (born 1955), Puerto Rican-born broadcaster and journalist
- Fidela Oller Angelats (1869–1936), Spanish Roman Catholic nun
- Francisco Oller (1833–1917), Puerto Rican Impressionist painter
- Francisco Oller Simón (1860–1940), Spanish and Argentinian publisher
- María Teresa Oller (1920–2018), Spanish Valencian composer and folklorist
- Narcís Oller (1846–1930), Spanish Catalan author
- Joseph Oller (1839–1922), Catalan-born French bookmaker, betting innovator and entertainment entrepreneur
- Rico Oller (1958–2025), U.S. politician

== See also ==
- Ullr
