= John Huston (disambiguation) =

John Huston (1906–1987) was an American screenwriter, actor and director (father of actress Anjelica Huston, director Danny Huston and Tony Huston)

John Huston may also refer to:

- John Huston (golfer) (born 1961), American professional golfer
- John Huston (polar explorer) (born 1974), American explorer
- John Huston (Nova Scotia politician) (1710–1795), politician in Nova Scotia
- John Huston (Illinois politician), American politician
- Jonathan Huston, Australian politician

== See also ==
- John Houston (disambiguation)
