= William Christy =

William Christy may refer to:

- William H. Christy, American politician, member of the Illinois House of Representatives
- William Miller Christy (1778–1858), English Quaker hat and textile manufacturer, and banker
