= John Houston =

John Houston is the name of:

- Sir John Houston, 2nd Baronet, of that Ilk, was Commissioner for Stirlingshire and for Renfrewshire
- Sir John Houston, 3rd Baronet (died 1722), his son, MP for Linlithgowshire
- John Houston (immigrant) (1690–1754), Scottish-Irish immigrant to Colonial America, great-grandfather of Sam Houston
- John Houston (doctor) (1802–1845), Irish-British doctor
- John Houston (New Zealand writer) (1891–1962), New Zealand historian and writer
- John Houston (newspaperman) (1850–1910), Pioneer newspaperman and politician from British Columbia, Canada
- John Houston (painter) (1930–2008), Scottish painter
- John Houston (skier), Canadian para-alpine skier
- John A. Houston (born 1952), U.S. federal judge
- John Caroll Houston IV (1842–1918), settler and three-term mayor of Eau Gallie, Florida
- John Mills Houston (1890–1975), U.S. Representative from Kansas
- John W. Houston (1814–1896), U.S. Representative from Delaware
- John Houston (rugby union) (born 1983), Scottish professional rugby centre or wing, also plays sevens for Scotland

== See also ==
- John Huston (disambiguation)
