= Andrew Miller =

Andrew Miller may refer to:

== Sports ==
- Andrew Miller (baseball) (born 1985), baseball pitcher
- Andrew Miller (cricketer, born 1963), cricketer for Oxford University and Middlesex
- Andrew Miller (cricketer, born 1987), cricketer for Warwickshire
- Andrew Miller (ice hockey) (born 1988), American ice hockey player
- Andrew Miller (rugby union) (born 1972), New Zealand rugby union player
- Andrew Miller (footballer) (1899–?), Scottish footballer
- Andy Miller (rugby union) (born 1982), rugby player for Exeter Chiefs
- Andy Miller (golfer) (born 1978), American golfer
- Andy Miller (harness racing) (born 1968), American harness racing driver
- Drew Miller (born 1984), American professional ice hockey player
- Drew Miller (offensive lineman) (born 1985), American football center
- Drew Miller (quarterback) (born 1978), American football quarterback
- Mack Miller (1931–2020), American cross-country skier and trainer

== Others ==
- Andrew Miller (engraver) (died 1763), English mezzotint engraver
- Andrew G. Miller (1801–1874), early judge of the United States District Court for the Eastern District of Wisconsin
- Andrew G. Miller (Pennsylvania politician) (1811–1880), member of the Pennsylvania Senate
- Andrew Miller (actor) (born 1969), actor who portrayed the autistic savant Kazan in the 1997 film Cube
- Andrew Miller (executive) (born 1966), CEO of the Guardian Media Group
- Andrew Miller (Illinois politician), 19th century Illinois state representative
- Andrew Miller (Medal of Honor, 1864) (1836–c. 1866), American Civil War Medal of Honor recipient
- Andrew Miller (Medal of Honor, 1944) (1916–1944), American World War II Medal of Honor recipient
- Andrew Miller (musician), former drummer for American band This Will Destroy You
- Andrew Miller (North Dakota judge) (1870–1960), North Dakota Attorney General and district court judge
- Andrew Miller (novelist) (born 1960), author of Ingenious Pain, Oxygen and Pure
- Andrew Miller (doctor), former president of the Australian Medical Association (WA)
- Andrew Miller (British politician) (1949–2019), British Labour Party politician
- Andrew Miller (publisher) (1857–1919), Life magazine publisher/owner, racehorse owner/breeder
- Andrew Miller (Royal Navy officer) (1926–1986), senior Royal Navy officer
- Andrew Miller (writer) (born 1974), author of The Earl of Petticoat Lane and Snowdrops
- Andrew P. Miller (1932–2021), attorney general of Virginia, 1970–1977
- Andy Miller (musician) (born 1968), guitarist for the band Dodgy
- Roy Andrew Miller (1924–2014), linguist, and proponent of the Altaic hypothesis
- Andy Miller (businessman) (born 1968), American businessman and corporate executive
- Andy Miller (writer), British writer, author of The Year of Reading Dangerously
- Andy Miller (US writer), American writer, joint winner of 2007 Writers Guild of America Award for Dramatic Series
- Andy Miller (record producer), Scottish record producer

== See also ==
- Andrew Millar (disambiguation)
