= Alexander Campbell (Illinois state representative, Edwards County) =

American politician

Member of the Illinois House of Representatives
- In office 1820–1824

Member of the Illinois House of Representatives
- In office 1852–1854

Alexander Campbell was an American politician who served as a member of the Illinois House of Representatives. He served as a state representative representing Wayne County in the 2nd Illinois General Assembly and the 3rd Illinois General Assembly. He later served as a state representative representing Wayne County in the 18th Illinois General Assembly.
