= David Sanborn (Illinois politician) =

American politician

Member of the Illinois House of Representatives
- In office 1850–1852

David Sanborn was an American politician who served as a member of the Illinois House of Representatives. He served as a state representative for the 40th District representing Peoria county in the 17th Illinois General Assembly.
