= 18th Illinois General Assembly =

Meeting of the Illinois state legislature from 1852 to 1854

The 18th Illinois General Assembly, consisting of the Illinois Senate and the Illinois House of Representatives, met from January 3, 1853, to February 14, 1853 (1st session); and from February 9, 1854, to March 4, 1854 (2nd session).

The 18th General Assembly was preceded by the 17th Illinois General Assembly, and was succeeded by the 19th Illinois General Assembly.

The Constitution of 1848, fixed the Senate at twenty-five members and the House at seventy-five members. The Constitution of 1848 also divided the state into 25 Senate districts and 54 House districts.

== House ==
District	Counties represented	Image	Representative	Remarks
1	Alexander · Pulaski · Union		John Cochran	
2	Hardin · Massac · Pope		Wesley Sloan	
3	Gallatin · Saline		David B. Russell	
4	Johnson · Williamson		David Y. Bridges	
5	Franklin · Jackson		John A. Logan	
6	Hamilton · Jefferson · Marion · Wayne		John Wilbanks	
6	Hamilton · Jefferson · Marion · Wayne		Alexander Campbell	
6	Hamilton · Jefferson · Marion · Wayne		John A. Wilson	
7	White		Daniel L. Jones	
8	Edwards · Wabash		Victor B. Bell	
9	Lawrence · Richland		William H. Christy	
10	Crawford · Jasper		William H. Sterret	
11	Coles		William D. Watson	
12	Clark		Uri Manley	
13	Clay · Cumberland · Effingham		Presley Funkhouser	
14	Fayette		A. J. Gallagher	Resigned
14	Fayette		N. M. McCurdy	Replaced Gallagher
15	Bond · Clinton · Montgomery		William H. Maddux	
15	Bond · Clinton · Montgomery		William Young	
16	Perry · Washington		William M. Phillips	
17	Randolph		Joseph Williamson	
18	Monroe		Thomas Winstanley	
19	St.Clair		John Reynolds	
19	St.Clair		William H. Snyder	
20	Madison		Samuel A. Buckmaster	
20	Madison		Thomas Judy	
21	Macoupin		Lewis Solomon	
22	Greene · Jersey		Giles H. Turner	
22	Greene · Jersey		Charles D. Hodges	
23	Scott		Royal Mooers	
24	Morgan		William Brown	
24	Morgan		Edward Lusk	
25	Cass · Menard		Cyrus Wright	
26	Sangamon		Pascal P. Enos	
26	Sangamon		James N. Brown	
27	Logan · Mason		Colby Knapp	
28	Tazewell		Richard N. Cullom	
29	DeWitt · McLean		John E. McClun	
30	Vermillion		Thomas Heyward	
31	Edgar		William Shields	
32	Champaign · Macon · Moultrie· Piatt		Henry Prather	
33	Christian · Shelby		Samuel W. Moulton	
34	Calhoun · Pike		Henry B. Buchanan	
34	Calhoun · Pike		Hugh L. Sutphin	
35	Adams · Brown		James M. Pittman	Resigned
35	Adams · Brown		Hiram Boyle	Replaced Pittman
35	Adams · Brown		John C. Moses	Resigned
35	Adams · Brown		James W. Singleton	Replaced Moses
35	Adams · Brown		David Wolf	
36	Schuyler		Francis E. Bryant	
37	Hancock		David Gochenour	
37	Hancock		Joseph Sibley	
38	McDonough		James M. Randolph	
39	Fulton		W. K. Johnson	
39	Fulton		L. H. Bradbury	
40	Peoria		Charles P. King	
41	Knox		Thomas McKee	
42	Henderson · Mercer · Warren		Samuel Darnell	
42	Henderson · Mercer · Warren		E. A. Paine	
43	Henry · Rock Island · Stark		William Marshall	
44	Lee · Whiteside		Joseph Crawford	
45	Carroll · Ogle		E. S. Potter	
46	Jo Daviess · Stephenson		Cyrenius B. Denio	
46	Jo Daviess · Stephenson		W. P. Narramore	
47	Winnebago		A. J. Enoch	
48	Marshall · Putnam · Woodford		Silas Ramsey	
49	Bureau · Grundy · LaSalle · Livingston		C. R. Porter	
49	Bureau · Grundy · LaSalle · Livingston		C. L. Starbuck	
50	Dupage · Iroquois · Kendall · Will		Joseph Thomas	
50	Dupage · Iroquois · Kendall · Will		R. N. Matthews	
50	Dupage · Iroquois · Kendall · Will		Joseph Naper	
51	DeKalb · Kane		John Ramstead	
51	DeKalb · Kane		William Shepherdson	
52	Boone · McHenry		H. C. Miller	
52	Boone · McHenry		A. H. Nixon	
53	Lake		Henry W. Blodgett	
54	Cook		W. B. Eagan	
54	Cook		Homer Wilmarth	

== Works cited ==
- Moses, John (1892). Illinois, historical and statistical.
- Blue Book of the State of Illinois. 1919.
- Blue Book of the State of Illinois - Illinois Legislative Roster — 1818-2024 (PDF). 2024. Archived from the original (PDF) on July 15, 2026.
