= Danny Jones (disambiguation) =

Danny Jones (born 1986) is an English musician and member of McFly.

Danny Jones may also refer to:

- Danny Jones (rugby league) (1986–2015), English rugby league footballer
- Danny Jones (film), a 1972 British drama film
- Danny Jones (basketball) (born 1968), retired American basketball player
- Danny Jones (politician) (born 1951), American, best known for serving four terms as mayor of Charleston, West Virginia

== See also ==
- Daniel Jones (disambiguation)
- Dan Jones (disambiguation)
- Jones (surname)
