= Dan Jones (digital creative director) =

Dan Jones (born 10 October 1979) is a British creative director, digital producer and television producer.

== Personal life ==
Jones was educated at the Royal Latin School in Buckingham, the University of Manchester and the University of Birmingham. In 2009 he was named University of Birmingham Alumnus of the Year. He lives in Hackney, London.

== Career ==
Jones joined television production company Maverick Television in 2002. In 2005, he established a multiplatform arm to Maverick Television and became Head of Multiplatform. In 2005, he received a BAFTA New Talent award and 2006 he received a Broadcast Hotshot award. In 2007, Maverick Television was bought by independent production and distribution company All3Media. Dan Jones became Digital Creative Director at Maverick Television in 2012 and joined the board of Maverick Television. In 2013 Dan Jones was named a Future Leader by the Royal Television Society. In 2014 All3Media was bought by Discovery Communications and Liberty Global. In July 2015 Jones joined Little Dot Studios as Director of Content.

== Notable Productions ==
- Embarrassing Bodies and Live from the Clinic
- Was it Something I Said?
- YouGen a.k.a. The You Generation
- Daily Mix
- Reverse the Odds
- Fresh Meat
- Rolling Stock Film Festival
- The Model Agency
