= Joseph Sibley (Illinois politician) =

American politician

Member of the Illinois House of Representatives
- In office 1850–1854

Joseph Sibley was an American politician who served as a member of the Illinois House of Representatives. He served as one of two state representatives for the 37th District representing Hancock county in the 17th Illinois General Assembly and 18th Illinois General Assembly.
