= 17th Illinois General Assembly =

Meeting of the Illinois state legislature from 1850 to 1852

The 17th Illinois General Assembly, consisting of the Illinois Senate and the Illinois House of Representatives, met from January 6, 1851, to February 17, 1851 (1st session); and from June 7, 1852, to June 23, 1852 (2nd session).

The 17th General Assembly was preceded by the 16th Illinois General Assembly, and was succeeded by the 18th Illinois General Assembly.

The Constitution of 1848, fixed the Senate at twenty-five members and the House at seventy-five members. The Constitution of 1848 also divided the state into 25 Senate districts and 54 House districts.

== House ==
District	Counties represented	Image	Representative	Remarks
1	Alexander · Pulaski · Union		Cyrus G. Simons	
2	Hardin · Massac · Pope		Wesley Sloan	
3	Gallatin · Saline		A. C. Caldwell	Died in office
3	Gallatin · Saline		Orville Sexton	Replaced Caldwell
4	Johnson · Williamson		Wilfred Ferrell	
5	Franklin · Jackson		Thomas M. Sams	
6	Hamilton · Jefferson · Marion · Wayne		Zadok Casey	
6	Hamilton · Jefferson · Marion · Wayne		Isham N. Haynie	
6	Hamilton · Jefferson · Marion · Wayne		William L. Gash	
7	White		Samuel H. Martin	
8	Edwards · Wabash		William Pickering	
9	Lawrence · Richland		Aaron Shaw	
10	Crawford · Jasper		James C. Allen	
11	Coles		Usher F. Linder	
12	Clark		T. C. Moore	
13	Clay · Cumberland · Effingham		William H. Blakely	
14	Fayette		Akins Evans	
15	Bond · Clinton · Montgomery		Sidney Breese	
15	Bond · Clinton · Montgomery		William Brewer	
16	Perry · Washington		Richard G. Murphy	
17	Randolph		John E. Detrick	
18	Monroe		Thomas Quick	
19	St.Clair		William H. Snyder	
19	St.Clair		Harbart Patterson	Resigned
19	St.Clair		Philip B. Fouke	Replace Patterson
20	Madison		Andrew Miller	
20	Madison		Nelson G. Edwards	Resigned
20	Madison		Samuel A. Buckmaster	Replace Edwards
21	Macoupin		Beatty T. Burke	
22	Greene · Jersey		Charles D. Hodges	
22	Greene · Jersey		J. C. Winters	
23	Scott		Nathan N. Knapp	
24	Morgan		William Thomas	
24	Morgan		Benjamin F. Bristow	
25	Cass · Menard		William T. Beekman	
26	Sangamon		Ninian W. Edwards	Resigned
26	Sangamon		Preston Breckenridge	
26	Sangamon		James C. Conkling	Replaced Edwards
27	Logan · Mason		John Pemberton	
28	Tazewell		Robert W. Briggs	
29	DeWitt · McLean		Robert F. Barnett	
30	Vermillion		Oliver L. Davis	
31	Edgar		Ozias Bailey	
32	Champaign · Macon · Moultrie· Piatt		Charles Emmerson	
33	Christian · Shelby		Anthony Thornton	
34	Calhoun · Pike		William D. Hamilton	
34	Calhoun · Pike		Ozias M. Hatch	
35	Adams · Brown		James W. Singleton	
35	Adams · Brown		J. R. Hobbs	
35	Adams · Brown		J. M. Pittman	
36	Schuyler		Alex Persinger	
37	Hancock		Joseph Sibley	
37	Hancock		John Carlin	
38	McDonough		John Huston	
39	Fulton		Thomas J. Little	
39	Fulton		Isaac Linley	
40	Peoria		David Sanborn	
41	Knox		Henry Arms	
42	Henderson · Mercer · Warren		Azro Patterson	
42	Henderson · Mercer · Warren		Thomas Willits	
43	Henry · Rock Island · Stark		James M. Allen	
44	Lee · Whiteside		Van J. Adams	
45	Carroll · Ogle		William T. Miller	
46	Jo Daviess · Stephenson		D. Wilson	
46	Jo Daviess · Stephenson		Bushrod B. Howard	
47	Winnebago		Horace Miller	
48	Marshall · Putnam · Woodford		E. B. Ames	
49	Bureau · Grundy · LaSalle · Livingston		Abraham L. Phillips	
49	Bureau · Grundy · LaSalle · Livingston		John Hise	
50	Dupage · Iroquois · Kendall · Will		S. W. Randal	
50	Dupage · Iroquois · Kendall · Will		Jesse O. Norton	
50	Dupage · Iroquois · Kendall · Will		W. F. Jones	Resigned
50	Dupage · Iroquois · Kendall · Will		Julius M. Warren	Replaced Jones
51	DeKalb · Kane		Augustus Adams	
51	DeKalb · Kane		Benjamin F. Hall	
52	Boone · McHenry		A. H. Nixon	
52	Boone · McHenry		George Gage	
53	Lake		Hurlburt Swan	
54	Cook		Philip Maxwell	
54	Cook		Thomas Dyer	

== Works cited ==
- Moses, John (1892). Illinois, historical and statistical.
- Blue Book of the State of Illinois. 1919.
- Blue Book of the State of Illinois - Illinois Legislative Roster — 1818-2024 (PDF). 2024. Archived from the original (PDF) on July 15, 2026.
