= Robert W. Briggs (Illinois politician) =

American politician

Member of the Illinois House of Representatives
- In office 1850–1852

Robert W. Briggs was an American politician who served as a member of the Illinois House of Representatives. He served as a state representative for the 28th District representing Tazewell county in the 17th Illinois General Assembly.
