= Isaac Linley =

American politician

Member of the Illinois House of Representatives
- In office 1850–1852

Isaac Linley was an American politician who served as a member of the Illinois House of Representatives. He served one of two state representatives for the 39th District representing Fulton county in the 17th Illinois General Assembly.
