= Charles Emmerson (Illinois politician) =

American politician

Member of the Illinois House of Representatives
- In office 1850–1852

Charles Emmerson was an American politician who served as a member of the Illinois House of Representatives. He served as a state representative for the 32nd District representing Champaign, Macon, Moultrie, and Piatt counties in the 17th Illinois General Assembly.
