= William Whitlock (journalist) =

New Zealand journalist, newspaper editor and proprietor

William Arthur Whitlock CBE (1891–1977) was a notable New Zealand journalist, newspaper editor and proprietor. He was born in Nelson, New Zealand, in 1891.

In 1953, Whitlock was awarded the Queen Elizabeth II Coronation Medal. In the 1961 Queen's Birthday Honours, he was appointed a Commander of the Order of the British Empire, for services to journalism.
