= Henry Arms =

American politician

Member of the Illinois House of Representatives
- In office 1850–1852

Henry Arms was an American politician who served as a member of the Illinois House of Representatives. He served as a state representative for the 41st District representing Knox county in the 17th Illinois General Assembly.
