= William Young (Illinois politician) =

American politician

Member of the Illinois House of Representatives
- In office 1852–1854

William Young was an American politician who served as a member of the Illinois House of Representatives. He served as one of two state representatives in the 15th District for Bond, Clinton, and Montgomery counties in the 18th Illinois General Assembly.
