= Van J. Adams =

American politician

Member of the Illinois House of Representatives
- In office 1850–1852

Van J. Adams was an American politician who served as a member of the Illinois House of Representatives. He served as a state representative for the 44th District representing Lee and Whiteside counties in the 17th Illinois General Assembly.
