= 1961 Birthday Honours (New Zealand) =

1961 New Zealand birthday honours

The 1961 Queen's Birthday Honours in New Zealand, celebrating the official birthday of Elizabeth II, were appointments made by the Queen on the advice of the New Zealand government to various orders and honours to reward and highlight good works by New Zealanders. They were announced on 10 June 1961.

The recipients of honours are displayed here as they were styled before their new honour.

== Knight Bachelor ==
- James Lawrence Hay OBE – chairman and managing director of Hay's Limited, Christchurch. For civic and charitable services.
- Roy Hunter Stevenson MBE – managing director of the Dunedin Engineering & Steel Company. For public and philanthropic services.
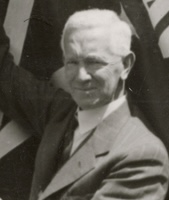
Sir James Hay

== Order of Saint Michael and Saint George ==
=== Companion (CMG) ===
- Frederick Horowhenua Melrose Hanson DSO OBE MM ED – Commissioner of Works.
- Brian Edwin Keiller – chairman of the Wellington Harbour Board.

== Order of the British Empire ==
=== Knight Commander (KBE) ===
Civil division

- Alfred Hayward CBE – formerly deputy chairman of the Dairy Board.

=== Commander (CBE) ===
Civil division

- George Bartrum Baker MBE DCM MM JP – of Timaru. For services to the farming community.
- George Philip Proctor – president of the New Zealand Manufacturers' Federation.
- Frank Felix Reid JP – chairman of the Town and Country Planning Board.
- William Arthur Whitlock – of Havelock North. For services to journalism.

Military division

- Brigadier Walter Sneddon McKinnon OBE – New Zealand Army.

=== Officer (OBE) ===
Civil division

- James Douglas Aitchison JP – of Palmerston North. For services to local government.
- Malcolm Scott Galloway MC JP – of Wellington. For services to the New Zealand Red Cross Society.
- John Houston – of Hāwera. For services to the community in Taranaki.
- Pei Te Hurinui Jones – of Taumarunui. For services to the Māori people.
- Captain Walter Geoffrey Kelsey – harbourmaster at Auckland.
- Morten Rennerberg Lawson JP – of Mangamaire. For services to local government.
- Ronald Wright McCredie – of Balclutha. For services to the community.
- Alexander Gibb Monahan – of Motueka. For services to local government and the community.
- Horace McDonald Scott – of Auckland. For services to education.
- John Turnbull – formerly general secretary of the New Zealand Public Service Association.
- Denys William Wanklyn Williams – of Tokomaru Bay. For services to local government.
- Pearce Melvin Eddy Williams JP – mayor of Kaikohe, and chairman of the Northland Hospital Board.

Military division

- Commander Cyril Howard Hilliard VRD – Royal New Zealand Naval Volunteer Reserve.
- Lieutenant-Colonel Leo Adolphus Kermode – New Zealand Regiment (Regular Force).
- Wing Commander Lawrence Hugh Edwards – Royal New Zealand Air Force.
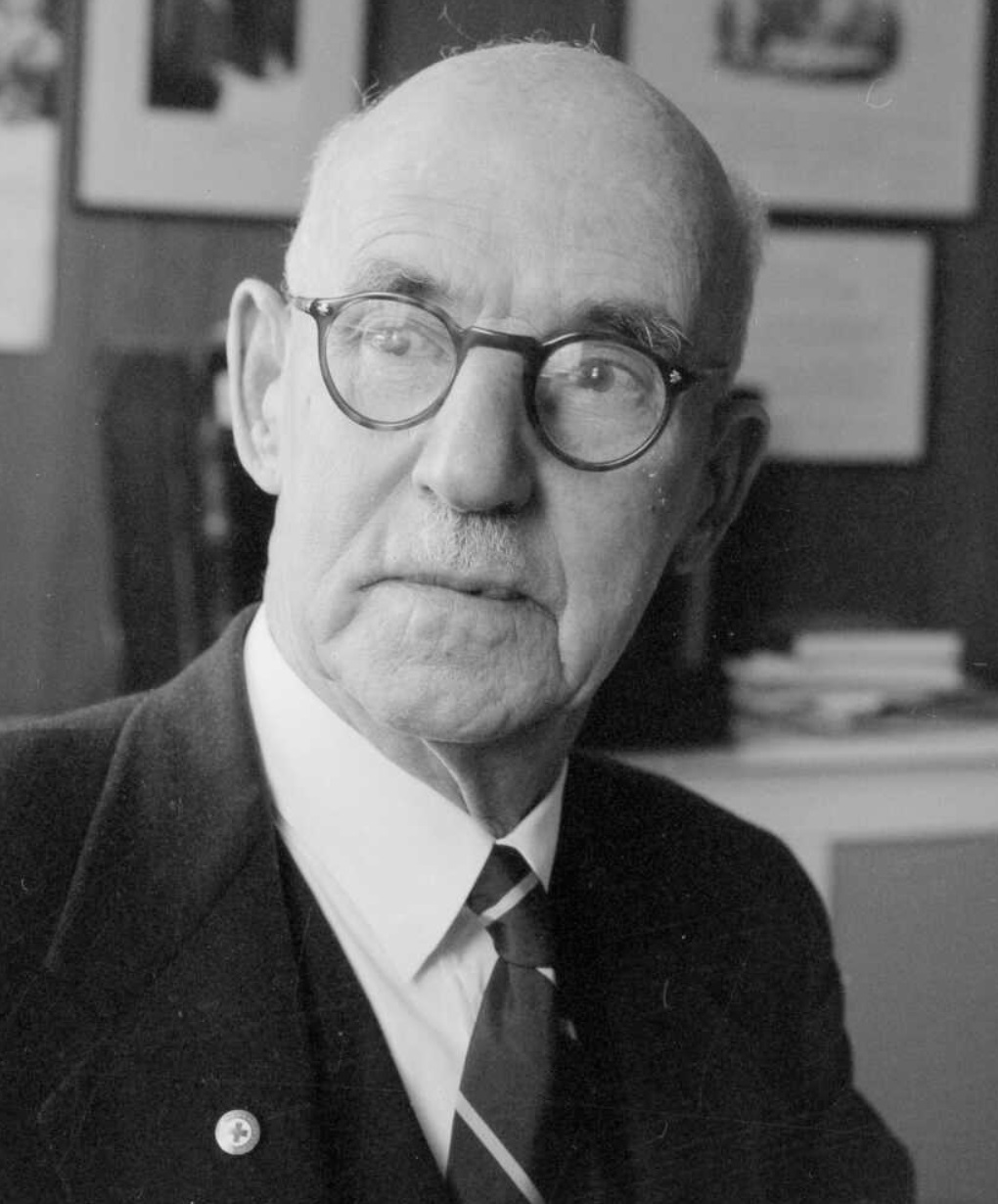
Malcolm Galloway

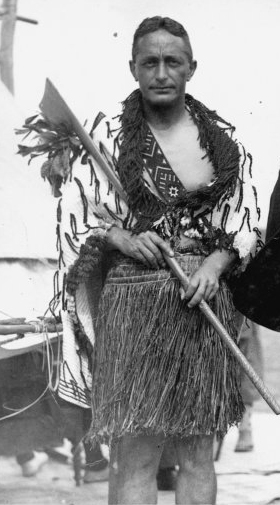
Pei Te Hurinui Jones

=== Member (MBE) ===
Civil division

- Margaret Mariner Bain – of Christchurch. For social-welfare services.
- Lucy Elizabeth Cook – of Marton. For services rendered under the auspices of the Royal New Zealand Society for the Health of Women and Children.
- Helen May Downer – of Rotorua. For services to the kindergarten movement.
- Edwin Edwards JP – of Paeroa. For services in the fields of social welfare and local government.
- Henry Charles Goffin – of Wellington; brigadier, Salvation Army.
- John James Halcrow. For services in the New Zealand Police.
- Herbert Gladstone Hill – of Wellington. For services in the fields of social welfare and music.
- Basil Hundleby – in recognition of his services as engineer to the Marlborough County Council.
- Charles William Sherlock Keinan – mayor of Milton, since 1944.
- Christian Lassen – of Hastings. For services to local government.
- The Reverend Pakake Heketoro Leonard – of Rotorua. For services to the Māori people.
- John William Macleod JP – of Loburn. For services to local government and the Returned Services' Association.
- Harry Archibald Mildon – honorary treasurer of the Auckland Returned Services' Association.
- Stanley John Snow – deputy mayor of Whangārei.
- Norman McLeod Speer – of Auckland. For services to the electrical industry.
- Constance Egmont Tulloch – of Putāruru. For social-welfare services.
- Norman Webley JP – of Dannevirke. For services to local government.
- Kathleen Gertrude Hurd-Wood – of Hamilton. For services to the League of Hard of Hearing in New Zealand.

Military division

- Lieutenant-Commander Douglas Gerald Bamfield – Royal New Zealand Navy.
- Captain John James Ayton – Corps of Royal New Zealand Electrical and Mechanical Engineers (Territorial Force).
- Warrant Officer Second Class Cecil Balfour Fowler – Royal New Zealand Infantry Corps (Territorial Force).
- Major Robert Ewen Johnston – New Zealand Regiment (Regular Force).
- Major Robert James Moor ED – Royal Regiment of New Zealand Artillery (Regular Force).
- Squadron Leader Lancelot James McLean – Royal New Zealand Air Force.
- Flight Officer Ernestine Graham Hume – Women's Royal New Zealand Air Force.

== Companion of the Imperial Service Order (ISO) ==
- John Francis Filmer – formerly director, Animal Research Division, Department of Agriculture.
- Raymond Edward Kemp – private secretary to the Postmaster-General.

== British Empire Medal (BEM) ==
Civil division, for gallantry

- Joseph Sheehan – detective, New Zealand Police Force. For courage and devotion to duty when effecting the arrest of a criminal armed with a rifle.
- Kenneth Miles Jones – constable, New Zealand Police Force. For arresting a mentally unstable person armed with a knife.

Military division

- Chief Petty Officer Edward Charles Frederick Barnes – Royal New Zealand Navy.
- Chief Petty Officer Henry Cyril Melville Brock – Royal New Zealand Navy.
- Chief Petty Officer William Montgomery Cedric Gibbs – Royal New Zealand Navy.
- Chief Petty Officer Writer Reginald Owen Smyth – Royal New Zealand Navy.
- Warrant Officer Second Class (Temporary) Raymond Alfred Arthur Burnett – Corps of Royal New Zealand Engineers (Regular Force).
- Warrant Officer Second Class (Temporary) Healy Preston – Royal New Zealand Army Service Corps (Regular Force).
- Sergeant John Charles Hart – Royal New Zealand Air Force.
- Corporal Francis Murphy – Royal New Zealand Air Force.

== Bar to Air Force Cross ==
- Wing Commander Geoffrey Reid Burton Highet DFC AFC – Royal New Zealand Air Force.

== Air Force Cross (AFC) ==
- Flying Officer Brian Gordon Anderson – Royal New Zealand Air Force.

== Queen's Commendation for Valuable Service in the Air ==
- Flight Lieutenant Mervyn Ryburn Breed DFC – New Zealand Air Force.
- Flight Lieutenant Winston Ross Swap Royal New Zealand Air Force.
