= William H. Snyder =

American politician

Member of the Illinois House of Representatives
- In office 1850–1854

William H. Snyder was an American politician who served as a member of the Illinois House of Representatives. He served as a state representative for the 18th District representing St. Clair county in the 17th Illinois General Assembly and the 18th Illinois General Assembly.
