= Horace Miller (Illinois politician) =

American politician

Member of the Illinois House of Representatives
- In office 1850–1852

Horace Miller was an American politician who served as a member of the Illinois House of Representatives. He served as a state representative for the 47th District representing Winnebago county in the 17th Illinois General Assembly.
