= William Brown (Illinois state representative, Morgan County) =

American politician

Member of the Illinois House of Representatives
- In office 1852–1854

William Brown was an American politician who served as a member of the Illinois House of Representatives. He served as one of two state representatives in the 24th District for Morgan county in the 18th Illinois General Assembly.
