= Nathan N. Knapp =

American politician

Member of the Illinois House of Representatives
- In office 1850–1852

Nathan N. Knapp was an American politician who served as a member of the Illinois House of Representatives. He served as a state representative for the 23rd District representing Scott county in the 17th Illinois General Assembly.
