= Benjamin F. Bristow =

American politician

Member of the Illinois House of Representatives
- In office 1850–1852

Benjamin F. Bristow was an American politician who served as a member of the Illinois House of Representatives. He served as one of two state representatives for the 24th District representing Morgan county in the 17th Illinois General Assembly.
