= Victor B. Bell =

American politician

Member of the Illinois House of Representatives
- In office 1852–1854

Victor B. Bell was an American politician who served as a member of the Illinois House of Representatives. He served as a state representative for the 8th District representing Edwards and Wabash counties in the 18th Illinois General Assembly.
