= Thomas Willits =

American politician

Member of the Illinois House of Representatives
- In office 1850–1852

Thomas Willits was an American politician who served as a member of the Illinois House of Representatives. He served as one of two state representatives for the 42nd District representing Henderson, Mercer, and Warren counties in the 17th Illinois General Assembly.
