= Denisse Oller =

Puerto Rican journalist (born 1955)

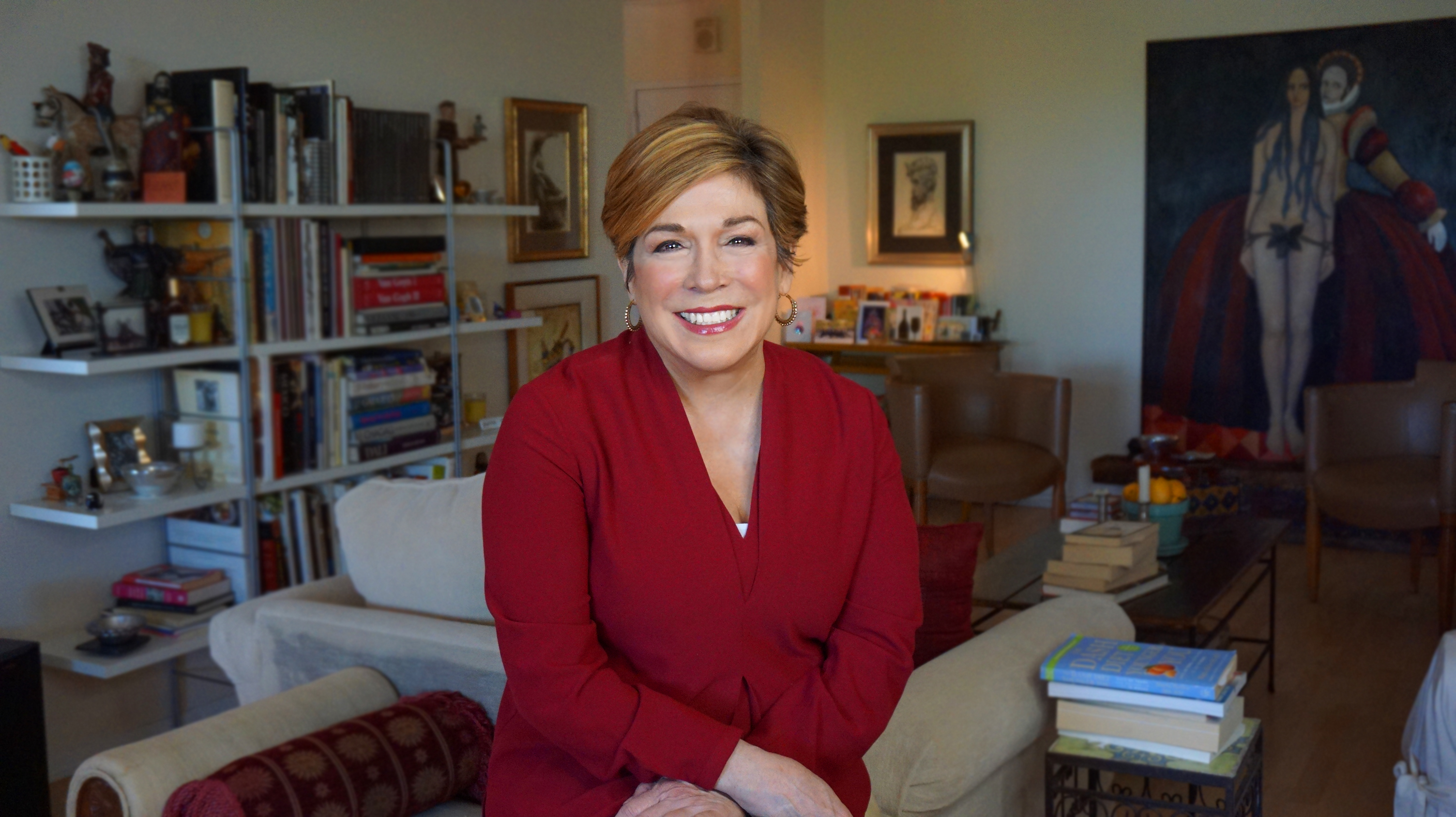
- Oller in 2019
- Born: Denisse Marie Oller; San Juan, Puerto Rico
- Status: Single
- Education: IESE; Seton Hall University; Emory University; Hunter College; University of Puerto Rico
- Occupations: Journalist, Documentarian, Communications Specialist & Trained Chef
- Notable credit(s): Edward R. Murrow and multi-Emmy Award winner Former Anchor and Correspondent (Univision, Telemundo); Food expert for AARP.
- Website: https://www.denisseoller.org/

Denisse Marie Oller (born September 30, 1955 in San Juan, Puerto Rico) is a journalist, documentarian, entrepreneur, author, chef, and healthy living advocate.

For over twenty years, she served as a correspondent, interviewer, news anchor, and television host for Univision and Telemundo, the two dominant Spanish-language television networks in the United States.

Oller has received nine Emmy Awards, five Emmy nominations, two Gracies from the American Women in Radio and Television and an Edward R. Murrow Award for Excellence in Journalism for her coverage of the US Navy withdrawal from the island of Vieques, Puerto Rico after sixty years of military occupation. In 1986, Denisse became the first news anchor of Noticiero Univision Weekend Edition. In 1995, she joined Raul Peimbert as co-anchor of Noticiero Telemundo National News, which airs weekdays in the United States and twenty-two countries in Latin America. Oller also left her mark in New York, where she has lived most of her life. From 2000 to 2017, Univision-NY's 6 PM and 11 PM newscasts with Rafael Pineda and Denisse Oller consistently surpassed all newscast ratings in the tri-state area in that time slot.

In 2006, Oller created NEWSWORKS Productions, LLC, an independent multimedia consulting firm that develops and promotes instructional and cultural material for US Hispanic audiences. NEWSWORKS develops content for Spanish speaking markets, focusing on wellness and mental health. NEWSWORKS offers communications consulting and marketing strategies for use in the U.S. Latino market and media training for senior executives.

Through her advocacy work with institutions such as AARP, HealthCorps, the American Diabetes Association, the Joseph A. Unanue Latino Institute at Seton Hall University, and SOMOS Community Care, Denisse Oller supports educational initiatives at the Latino community's forefront.

== Background ==
Born and raised in San Juan, Puerto Rico, Denisse Oller graduated Summa Cum Laude from University of Puerto Rico High School. She attended the University of Puerto Rico, Rio Piedras Campus, where she majored in Finance and minored in French before attending Hunter College in New York City, where she graduated Summa Cum Laude with a bachelor's degree in media studies and a minor in Interpersonal Communications. Denisse subsequently pursued graduate studies at Seton Hall University and IESE Business School, University of Navarra, Spain. Oller lived in Madrid, Spain, during her youth before moving permanently to New York City.

Her other interest is healthy cooking. A graduate of the Culinary Education Institute in New York City, Oller was a guest instructor at the Institute, as well as a chef-collaborator for AARP. She also appeared on Fox Good Day NY, NBC's Today Show, Martha Stewart Living, Food Network's "Throwdown with Bobby Flay" and CNN en Español, advocating for a healthier lifestyle and food choices for the Latino community. Oller has repeatedly appeared as a guest chef at Puerto Rico's premiere food festival, Saborea.

== Television career ==
Oller started her career in television journalism at Telemundo NY in 1985 as a news writer and general assignment reporter. One of her first duties was to cover the Challenger disaster in January 1986. She then took up a National News correspondent position based in New York. Shortly after, Oller was tapped to anchor Univision's "Weekend Edition" newscast, the first Puerto Rican and the first Latina to anchor a US Spanish speaking national news weekend broadcast. She also served as a national correspondent in Los Angeles and New York.

She won her first Emmy in 1991 for coverage of the Gulf War heroes' arrival in New York. This honor marked the first time an Emmy was awarded to a Spanish language station (Univision) in New York.

In 1992, Oller relocated to Miami to anchor 'Primera Hora', Telemundo's early morning national news program. Once the show ended, she moved to Washington, DC, as a correspondent for Telemundo National News, and in 1995, she became co-anchor of Telemundo Network's national newscast. Oller's work has been recognized by prominent national journalistic and advocacy institutions such as the Associated Press, the National Organization for Women (NOW), the American Women in Radio and Television, the Media Institute, the Emmys, and the Radio Television Digital News Association (RTDNA.) Oller also received the Edward R. Murrow Award for excellence in investigative reporting. Oller is a documentary filmmaker, having won a National Emmy for her investigative work "Hora Cero: Nicaragua in Transition".

As a field reporter, Oller covered such events as the 9/11 terrorist attacks, the 1995 Oklahoma City bombings, the 1994 earthquake in Northridge, California, President Clinton's impeachment process, and the historic visit of Pope John Paul II to Cuba, where she interviewed both dissidents and government officials.

In 1999, she returned to New York as co-anchor of the highest-rated newscasts in the tri-state area, Univision-NY News 41, at 6 PM and 11 PM. In November 2007, Oller officially ended her 20-year career in the news to pursue independent ventures and establish NEWSWORKS Productions, a multi-platform entity specializing in contemporary lifestyle subjects and current events.

== Voice for the Latino Community ==
As Vice President of Media Relations and Engagement for SOMOS Community Care – a non-profit network that serves more than one million Medicaid recipients in underserved communities in the Bronx, Brooklyn, Manhattan, and Queens – Oller developed communications and public relations initiatives to advocate for healthcare reform.

From 2005 to 2022, Oller led SOMOS Community Care's DASH (Dietary Approaches to Stop Hypertension) outreach programs on preventive health care and healthier lifestyle choices, and efforts to improve health literacy as prevention in underserved communities where chronic illnesses such as diabetes, cardiovascular disease, and obesity is prevalent.

Before SOMOS, Oller worked for a number of non-profit entities. From 2010 to 2016, she was the Executive Director of The Joseph A. Unanue Latino Institute at Seton Hall University, an organization dedicated to supporting Latino students by providing scholarships, educational opportunities, and leadership initiatives.

Oller is currently working on a book on self-esteem and mental health and continues her work as an influencer.
