= Thomas Quick (Illinois politician) =

American politician

Member of the Illinois House of Representatives
- In office 1850–1852

Thomas Quick was an American politician who served as a member of the Illinois House of Representatives. He served as a state representative for the 18th District representing Monroe county in the 17th Illinois General Assembly.
