= Frederick Hanson (engineer) =

New Zealand soldier, engineer (1895–1979)

Frederick Melrose Horowhenua Hanson
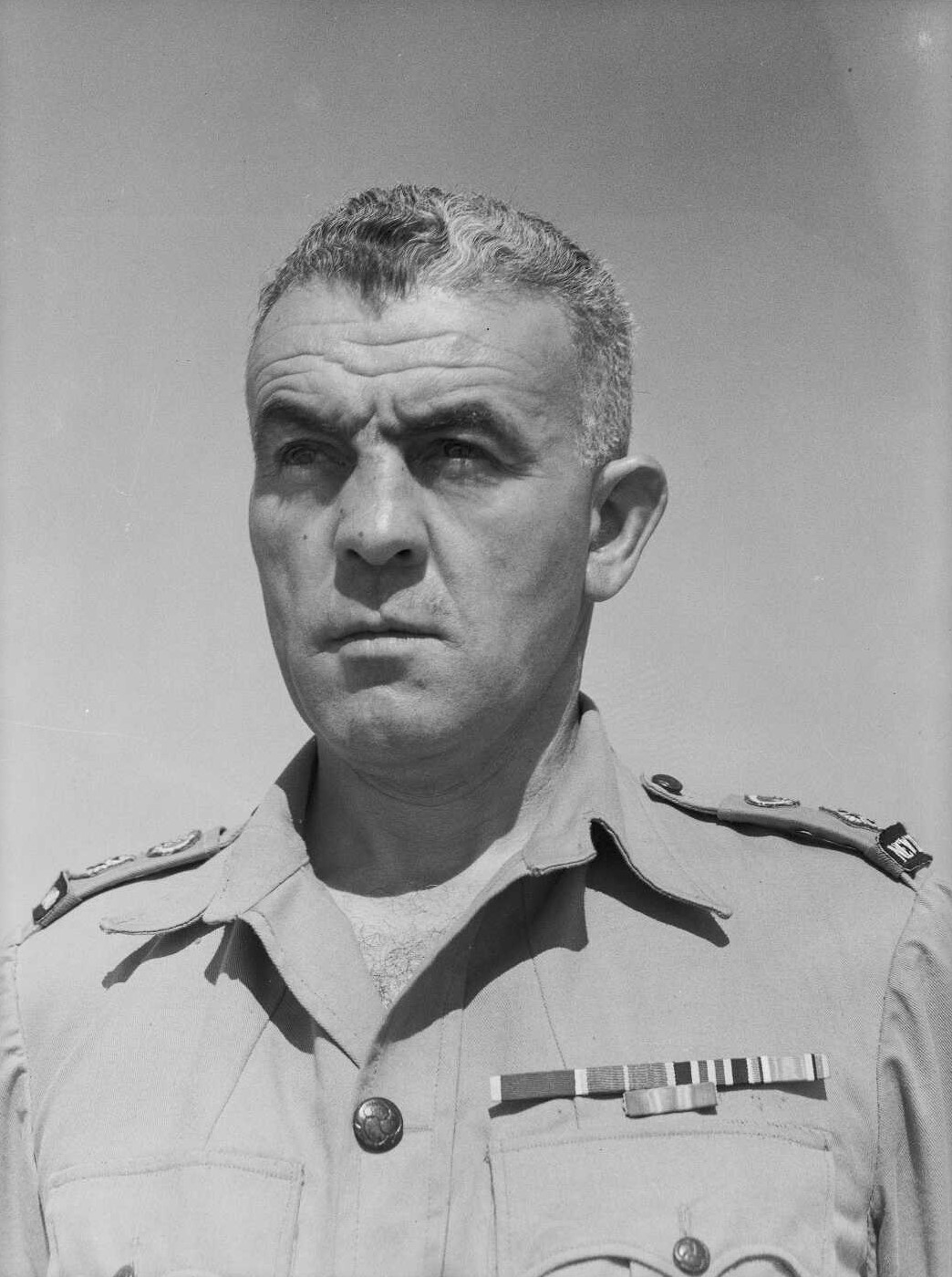
- Hanson in Egypt, August 1943.
- Born: 9 July 1895; Levin, New Zealand
- Died: 15 July 1979 (aged 84); Wellington, New Zealand
- Military career
- Allegiance: New Zealand
- Branch: New Zealand Military Forces
- Rank: Brigadier
- Service number: 20034
- Conflicts: First World War; Western Front; Second World War; Battle of Greece; Battle of Crete; Western Desert campaign; Italian campaign
- Awards: Companion of the Order of St Michael and St George; Distinguished Service Order & bar Military Medal; Officer of the Order of the British Empire

Brigadier Frederick Melrose Horowhenua Hanson CMG DSO OBE MM (9 July 1895 – 15 July 1979) was a New Zealand soldier, engineer, military leader and public servant.

Born in 1895, Hanson joined the New Zealand Expeditionary Force during the First World War and served on the Western Front. By the end of the war he had reached the rank of sergeant and been awarded the Military Medal. During the interwar period, he was employed by the Public Works Department on hydroelectric projects and public roading. He later worked for the Main Highways Board. During the Second World War, he served with the 2nd New Zealand Division as a commander of an engineering field company. He later became the overall commander of the New Zealand Engineers of the Second New Zealand Expeditionary Force and served in Greece, Crete, North Africa and Italy. He received official recognition for his efforts in the war, receiving the Distinguished Service Order and bar and was appointed an Officer of the Order of the British Empire. Ending the war with the rank of brigadier, he returned to civilian life as the chief engineer of the Main Highways Board. He was later appointed the Commissioner of Works, the senior position at the Ministry of Works and responsible for 4,500 employees. Retiring from public service in 1961, he died in 1979 at the age of 84.

== Early life ==
Born in the town of Levin, in the Horowhenua District of New Zealand, on 9 July 1895, Frederick Melrose Horowhenua Hanson was the son of a farmer, also called Frederick Hanson, and his wife, Eliza Elizabeth Tantrum. He was educated locally and won a scholarship to Wellington College where he excelled both in his studies and sports. He participated in the school's cadet program and in 1914 was commissioned in the Territorial Force as a second lieutenant.

In 1915, Hanson passed the entrance examination for the Royal Military College, Duntroon, in Australia, which set aside a limited number of enrolments for New Zealanders. He duly entered Duntroon but misled authorities as to his age. Although academically successful, misconduct resulted in his expulsion from Duntroon in October 1917.

== First World War ==
Returning to New Zealand, Hanson volunteered for the New Zealand Expeditionary Force (NZEF) for service in the First World War. He was posted to the Wellington Infantry Regiment, then serving on the Western Front. He soon attained the rank of sergeant and, for his gallantry in an action that took place in September 1918, was awarded the Military Medal. After the war, he was part of a team of NZEF personnel that toured the United Kingdom playing rugby. He eventually returned to New Zealand in September 1919.

== Interwar period ==
Hanson returned to civilian life, becoming a qualified surveyor. He remained in the Territorial Force and was promoted to lieutenant soon after arriving back in New Zealand. He was moved to the reserve of officers in 1922 and eventually was placed on the retired list in 1930. In the meantime, he had joined the Public Works Department. He worked on hydroelectric projects for a time and then moved into roading. In 1935, he developed the low cost road surfacing technique known as chipseal that remains in widespread use. He was later an engineer for the Main Highways Board.

== Second World War ==
Hanson enlisted in what became the second echelon of the 2nd New Zealand Expeditionary Force (2NZEF) following the outbreak of the Second World War. In January 1940, with the rank of major, he was posted to command of 7th Field Company, New Zealand Engineers, for which officers and non-commissioned officers began a period of training at Narrow Neck Camp, in Auckland, before the main body of the company arrived at the nearby Papakura Military Camp. With training complete by late April 1940, 7th Field Company left New Zealand aboard the RMS Aquitania, destined, along the other units aboard, for Egypt. It was to join the first echelon of 2NZEF to form what would be known as the 2nd New Zealand Division. However, the second echelon was diverted en route to England following the threat of a German invasion. Here Hanson's company carried out training and guard duties in the area around Dover before being shipped to Egypt in early 1941.

Within a matter of weeks, the 2nd New Zealand Division was in Greece and manning defences on the Aliakmon Line in preparation for the anticipated invasion of the country by the Germans. During the subsequent retreat of the Allies following the commencement of the German advance into Greece, Hanson's command was often involved in delaying tactics through the destruction of strategic points. After the end of the campaign in Greece, most of the division's personnel, including Hanson, were evacuated to the island of Crete. Here, Hanson was appointed the acting Commander, Royal Engineers (CRE), for the division. He and his men were kept busy building defensive positions for use in the subsequent Battle of Crete. He had proposed to render the airfield at Maleme unusable but was overruled. The airfield subsequently fell to German forces once their invasion of Crete began on 20 May and it proved crucial in allowing reinforcements and supplies to be landed in the early stages of the battle. At one stage, Hanson was involved in an attack, the Battle of 42nd Street, but eventually the New Zealanders and other surviving Allied forces had to be evacuated from the island to Egypt.

Back in North Africa, Hanson was promoted to lieutenant colonel and made the permanent CRE for the 2nd New Zealand Division. He was active in the African campaigns of 1941-42 and was recognised for his efforts in September 1942 with an appointment as an Officer of the Order of the British Empire. He was also mentioned in dispatches for his services in the Middle East from May to October 1942. The following month, he was awarded the Distinguished Service Order (DSO) for an action at Wadi Akarit in April 1943.

Later that year Hanson was made CRE for the entire 2NZEF. By this stage of the war, the 2nd New Zealand Division was participating in the Italian campaign. Hanson was largely responsible for the development of the river crossing techniques employed by the New Zealanders as they gradually advanced up Italy. He received a bar to his DSO for this work. After the war, he was discharged from the 2NZEF with the rank of brigadier.

== Later life ==
In 1946, Hanson returned to the Main Highways Board, this time as its chief engineer. He worked towards the implementation of legalisation that re-organised the Main Highways Board into the National Roads Board, and was appointed its first chairman. In 1953, Hanson was awarded the Queen Elizabeth II Coronation Medal.

In 1955, Hanson was appointed to the senior position at the Ministry of Works (formerly the Public Works Department), the Commissioner of Works, having spent the previous four years as Deputy Commissioner. His ministry, which employed almost 4,500 people, played an important role in the economic resurrection of New Zealand following the Second World War, with several major developments relating to hydroelectric schemes. He also served a term on the Army Board, from 1952 to 1955 and was president of the New Zealand Institution of Engineers for two years.

Hanson retired from the Ministry of Works in December 1961 but not before being recognised for his public services with an appointment as a Companion of the Order of St Michael and St George in the 1961 Queen's Birthday Honours. He died on 15 July 1979. He was survived by his wife, Margaret Constance Grindley, who he had married in 1924. The couple had no children.

== Bibliography ==
- Cody, J. F. (1961). New Zealand Engineers, Middle East. Official History of New Zealand in the Second World War 1939–45. Wellington, New Zealand: Historical Publications Branch.
- McClymont, W. G. (1959). To Greece. Official History of New Zealand in the Second World War 1939–45. Wellington, New Zealand: War History Branch. OCLC 4373298.
- Pugsley, Christopher (2014). A Bloody Road Home: World War Two and New Zealand's Heroic Second Division. Auckland, New Zealand: Penguin Books. ISBN 978-0-143-57189-6.
