= Joseph Harwood =

British transgender model and activist

Joseph (Jojo) Harwood (née Lawrence, born 3 May 1990) is a British makeup artist and social media personality. In 2013, Harwood won the makeup category of The You Generation, a competition created by Simon Cowell’s Syco Entertainment in partnership with YouTube.

== Early life ==
Harwood was born and raised in Brighton.

== Social media ==
Harwood began publishing makeup tutorials and celebrity transformation videos on YouTube. In 2013, Harwood entered the makeup category of The You Generation, a year-long online talent competition launched by Simon Cowell in partnership with YouTube. Harwood's entry was selected as the category winner by Pixiwoo. In April 2014, Harwood was subsequently announced as the competition's grand prize winner.

== Makeup artistry ==
In 2019, Harwood collaborated with cosmetics brand Jecca Blac on its Sculpt & Soften Palette. Harwood has been interviewed about gender and makeup by publications including the BBC, British Vogue and Elle. Harwood has served on the British Beauty Council's Diversity, Equity and Inclusion Committee. In 2022, Harwood was appointed to the advisory board of beauty technology company Revieve, with a focus on its diversity, equity and inclusion programmes.

=== Activism ===
Harwood has served as a Young Ambassador for The Prince's Trust.
