= John Wilbanks (Illinois politician) =

American politician

Member of the Illinois House of Representatives
- In office 1852–1854

John Wilbanks was an American politician who served as a member of the Illinois House of Representatives. He served as a state representative for the 4th District representing Hamilton, Jefferson, Marion, and Wayne counties in the 18th Illinois General Assembly.
