= Jack Filmer =

John Francis Filmer ISO (born in Tatura, Victoria, Australia on 16 September 1895 and died in Wellington, New Zealand on 19 July 1979) was an Australian-born scientist who later emigrated to New Zealand to continue his scientific research career.

== Early life ==
Filmer spent his early life in Western Australia and won a Government Exhibition Scholarship which took him to the University of Melbourne from which he graduated B.V.Sc. in 1916.

In the First World War, Filmer served with the Royal Army Veterinary Corps in Greece and Salonika.

== Research success ==
On his return to Australia, Filmer commenced private practice in Katanning in Western Australia. In 1925, he joined the Department of Agriculture in Fremantle. Filmer worked on the problem of Denmark Disease or enzootic marasmus.

During his period in Western Australia, Filmer, in collaboration with E. J. Underwood, achieved a major research success which was to prove of incalculable benefit to agriculture in New Zealand and throughout the world. "Bush sickness" had imposed severe restrictions on animal production in New Zealand. The use of iron compounds had resulted in a partial though precarious control of the disease. Filmer and Underwood showed that the beneficial effect of iron compounds resided in the minute amount of cobalt present as an impurity. This meant that the way was open for complete control of bush sickness and allied wasting diseases. The two men suggested that the effect of cobalt on cattle and sheep might be mediated through "some growth factor for whose formation cobalt is necessary". This clearly foreshadowed the discovery of vitamin B12 and proof that the role of cobalt as an essential trace element is exerted through this vitamin.

== Later career ==
Filmer moved to Victoria in 1936 and took up the position of Veterinary Research Officer with the Western Districts Research Association in Camperdown. He emigrated to New Zealand in 1938 where he soon became director of the Animal Research Division of the Department of Agriculture, a position he held until his retirement in September 1960. Soon afterwards, the University of Melbourne conferred on Filmer the degree of D.V.Sc. for a thesis on his work on cobalt deficiency.

Filmer was Secretary to Section L of the Australian and New Zealand Association for the Advancement of Science (ANZAAS) in 1926 and was president and life member of the New Zealand Animal Production Society. In 1954, Filmer was elected an honorary Associate of the Royal College of Veterinary Surgeons. He was President of the New Zealand Grasslands Association in 1955.

In 1961, Filmer was awarded the Fellowship of the Royal Society of New Zealand. In the same year, he was appointed a Companion of the Imperial Service Order in the Queen's Birthday Honours.

Filmer was twice president of the New Zealand Veterinary Association and he was elected a life member in 1961.

In 1968, Massey University conferred on Filmer the degree of Honorary Doctor of Science and in 1971 he was elected a Life Fellow of the Australian College of Veterinary Scientists.
