= Abraham L. Phillips =

American politician

Member of the Illinois House of Representatives
- In office 1850–1852

Abraham L. Phillips was an American politician who served as a member of the Illinois House of Representatives. He served as a state representative for the 49th District representing Bureau, Grundy, LaSalle, and Livingston counties in the 17th Illinois General Assembly.
