= Joseph Sibley =

Joseph Sibley may refer to:

- Joseph C. Sibley (1850–1926), American politician
- Joseph Sibley (Illinois politician), 19th century Illinois state representative
