= Andrew Millar =

Andrew Millar may refer to:

- Andrew Millar (publisher) (1705–1768), British publisher and bookseller
- Andrew Millar (biologist) (fl. 1980s–2020s), Scottish biologist
- Andrew Millar (table tennis) (1916–1987), English table tennis player

== See also ==
- Andrew Miller (disambiguation)
- Androw Myllar (fl. 1503–1508) was the first Scottish printer.
