= Cyrus G. Simons =

American politician

Member of the Illinois House of Representatives
- In office 1850–1852

Cyrus G. Simons was an American politician who served as a member of the Illinois House of Representatives. He served as a state representative for the 1st District representing Alexander, Pulaski, and Union counties in the 17th Illinois General Assembly.
