= Henry Goffin =

Henry Charles Goffin MBE (8 March 1885 – 3 March 1973) served as a Salvation Army Officer, Bandmaster, Musician and Composer in Britain and New Zealand. He was born in Plymouth, Devonshire, England, on 8 March 1885.

In the 1961 Queen's Birthday Honours, Goffin was appointed a Member of the Order of the British Empire.
