= William H. Sterret =

American politician

Member of the Illinois House of Representatives
- In office 1852–1854

William H. Sterret was an American politician who served as a member of the Illinois House of Representatives. He served as a state representative for the 10th District representing Crawford and Jasper counties in the 18th Illinois General Assembly.
