= Kathleen Hurd-Wood =

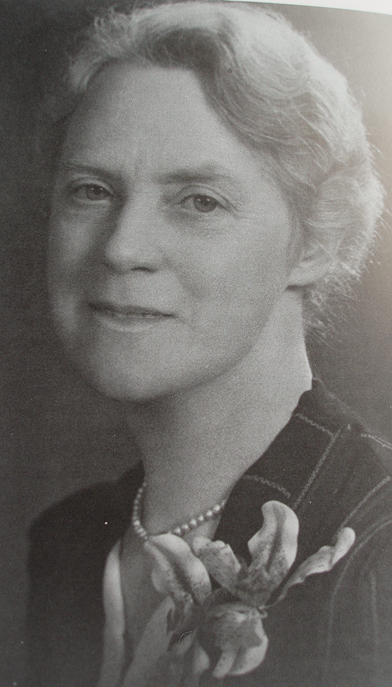
Portrait of New Zealand activist and disability rights leader Kathleen Hurd-Wood

Kathleen Gertrude Hurd-Wood MBE (née Chitty, 1 August 1886 – 10 April 1965) was a New Zealand advocate for the hard of hearing. She was born in Kirikiriroa, near Hamilton, New Zealand, on 1 August 1886.

Following her husband's death in 1924, she dedicated herself to supporting people with hearing loss. She founded the NZ League for the Hard of Hearing in 1932 which survives to this day as Hearing New Zealand and Auckland Hearing which is the longest-running organisation for people with hearing loss in New Zealand.

In the 1961 Queen's Birthday Honours, Hurd-Wood was appointed a Member of the Order of the British Empire, for services to the League of Hard of Hearing.
