= David B. Russell =

American politician

Member of the Illinois House of Representatives
- In office 1852–1854

David B. Russell was an American politician who served as a member of the Illinois House of Representatives. He served as a state representative for the 3rd District representing Gallatin and Saline counties in the 18th Illinois General Assembly.
