= Royal Mooers =

American politician

Member of the Illinois House of Representatives
- In office 1852–1854

Royal Mooers was an American politician who served as a member of the Illinois House of Representatives. He served as a state representative in the 23rd District for Scott county in the 18th Illinois General Assembly.
