= William Brewer (Illinois politician) =

American politician

Wilfred Ferrell

Member of the Illinois House of Representatives
- In office 1850–1852

William Brewer was an American politician who served as a member of the Illinois House of Representatives. He served as one of two state representatives (along with Sidney Breese) for the 15th District representing Bond, Clinton, and Montgomery counties in the 17th Illinois General Assembly.
