= Thomas Winstanley (Illinois politician) =

American politician

Member of the Illinois House of Representatives
- In office 1852–1854

Thomas Winstanley was an American politician who served as a member of the Illinois House of Representatives. He served as a state representative in the 18th District for Monroe county in the 18th Illinois General Assembly.
