= William D. Hamilton (Illinois politician) =

American politician

Member of the Illinois House of Representatives
- In office 1850–1852

William D. Hamilton was an American politician who served as a member of the Illinois House of Representatives. He served as one of two state representatives for the 34th District representing Calhoun and Pike counties in the 17th Illinois General Assembly.
