= Jack Pemberton =

Australian rules footballer (1883–1968)

Personal information
- Full name: John Herbert Pemberton
- Born: 11 January 1883; Colac, Victoria
- Died: 29 May 1968 (aged 85); Preston, Victoria
- Original team: Richmond (VFA)
- Position: Midfielder

Playing career^{1}
Years	Club	Games (Goals)
1906–07	Colac	
1908	Richmond	3 (0)
1909–14	North Melbourne (VFA)	66 (0)
1914–15	Northcote (VFA)	5 (0)

Coaching career
Years	Club	Games (W–L–D)
1931	North Melbourne	8 (0–8–0)
- ^{1} Playing statistics correct to the end of 1919.

John Herbert Pemberton (11 January 1883 – 29 May 1968) was an Australian rules footballer who played with Richmond in the Victorian Football League (VFL).

Perberton was a medium sized man who was a very good runner, in 1904 he won the Colac Gift.

== Playing career ==
Pemberton made three senior appearances for Richmond in their inaugural VFL season, all of which they lost. He subsequently played for North Melbourne and Northcote in the Victorian Football Association.

== Coaching career ==
In 1931 Norm Clark was appointed coach of North Melbourne but after 10 games in which resulted in ten losses he resigned. John Pemberton stepped in to be caretaker coach for the rest of the 1931 VFL season. As coach of North Melbourne he was in charge for eight games. North Melbourne lost each of them as well, meaning that Pemberton failed to experience a win either as a player or coach in the VFL. In 1932 he became a team selector for the club.
