= Andrew Miller (Illinois politician) =

American politician

Member of the Illinois House of Representatives
- In office 1850–1852

Andrew Miller was an American politician who served as a member of the Illinois House of Representatives. He served as one of two state representatives for the 20th District representing Madison county in the 17th Illinois General Assembly.
