= John Pemberton (Illinois politician) =

American politician

Member of the Illinois House of Representatives
- In office 1850–1852

John Pemberton was an American politician who served as a member of the Illinois House of Representatives. He served as a state representative for the 27th District representing Logan and Mason counties in the 17th Illinois General Assembly.
