= Dan Jones (professor) =

American academic (born 1952)

Dan Jones (born 1952) is a professor emeritus who taught a variety of technical communication courses in the Department of English at the University of Central Florida in Orlando, Florida from 1983 to 2018. He retired in 2018. He is also a Fellow of the Society for Technical Communication. He earned his B.A., M.A. and PhD degrees from Florida State University in 1974, 1976 and 1979, respectively.

== Career ==
Jones' research and teaching interests focused on the strategies technical professionals use in their workplace communications, particularly their language and style choices. Another major interest was technical communication pedagogy.

He played a major role in program development at UCF for the B.A. program (established in 1984) and M.A. program (established in 1992) in English/Technical Communication. He also played an important role in the planning and development of the Texts and Technology PhD program in the College of Arts and Humanities at the university. The first classes for the doctoral program were offered in the fall of 2001 with the first graduates defending their dissertations in the spring of 2004.

His contributions to the profession of technical communication include his service for five years (1990–1995) as Secretary/Treasurer of the Association of Teachers of Technical Writing (ATTW) as well as his service on committees for both ATTW and the Society for Technical Communication (STC). He was also recognized for his contributions to the field by STC, receiving the Jay R. Gould Award for Excellence in Teaching Technical Communication in 1998, becoming a Fellow in 2000, and receiving three major awards from Florida STC, the local chapter. Also, in 2003 the IEEE Professional Communication Society presented him the Ronald S. Blicq Award, “To recognize distinguished contributions to technical communication education.”

Jones also spent four years (1979–1983) teaching technical communication at Embry–Riddle Aeronautical University, Daytona Beach before joining the UCF faculty, and he worked as a consultant for numerous companies, including AT&T, IBM, Westinghouse Licensing Corporation and Lockheed Martin.

== Works ==
Professor Jones' contributions to his field include four books: Defining Technical Communication (editor, Society for Technical Communication, 1996), Technical Writing Style (Allyn & Bacon, 1998), The Technical Communicator’s Handbook (Allyn & Bacon, 2000), and Technical Communication: Strategies for College and the Workplace (Longman, 2002)—co-authored with Karen Lane. Technical Writing Style is part of the prestigious series of advanced technical communication books published by Allyn & Bacon. He also published numerous articles.

=== Edited works ===
- Defining Technical Communication. STC, August 1996. ISBN 9780914548928
- Cindy Haupter, Bob Stultz, Suzanne Shomate and John Donovan. Meet the Future: Leveraging Multimedia for Professional and Educational Outreach. Overseen with Dan Voss. STC Conference Proceedings, 2004.

=== Original works ===
- Technical Communication: Strategies for College and the Workplace. With Karen Lane. New York: Longman, 2002. ISBN 9780205325214
- Technical Writing Style. Boston: Allyn & Bacon, 1998. ISBN 9780205197224
- The Technical Communicator's Handbook. Pearson Education, 2000. ISBN 9780205279326
