= John Houston (New Zealand writer) =

New Zealand historian and writer

John Houston OBE (1891 – 20 June 1962) was a New Zealand historian and writer who specialised in the history of Taranaki Māori, and of the Taranaki land wars. He spent 30 years studying and recording Māori history and lore, the result of which was the posthumously published Maori Life in Old Taranaki (1965). Other works included Turi of the Aotea canoe (1933) and the Encyclopedia of New Zealand biography of Kimball Bent (1966).

In the 1961 Queen's Birthday Honours, Houston was appointed an Officer of the Order of the British Empire, for services to the community in Taranaki.
