= John Pemberton (physician) =

Professor John Pemberton
- Born: 18 November 1912; Romford, Essex, England
- Died: 7 February 2010 (aged 97)
- Occupation: Epidemiologist

John Pemberton FRCP (1912–2010) was a British epidemiologist.

Pemberton was born on 18 November 1912, in Romford, Essex, to Marie Lottie (née Talbot) and Augustus Charles Pemberton, the latter being a steward at Christ's Hospital, Horsham.

He studied at Christ's Hospital and then at University College London, where he qualified in medicine in 1936, subsequently working at University College Hospital and then Miller General Hospital. He was excused military service during World War II, as he had tuberculosis.

In 1958 he became Professor of Social and Preventive Medicine at Queen's University Belfast, retiring in 1976 and becoming emeritus. He was also a consultant in Social and Preventive Medicine at the Royal Victoria Hospital, Belfast.

in 1957 he was both founder member and first treasurer of the Society for Social Medicine and co-founder of the International Epidemiological Association.

He died on 7 February 2010.
