= Daniel W. Jones (politician) =

American politician (1941–2026)

Member of the New Hampshire House of Representatives from the Rockingham 13th district
- In office 1978–1980

Personal details
- Born: Daniel Wilcox Jones; January 1, 1945 Washington, D.C., U.S.
- Died: May 5, 2026 (aged 81) Middlebury, Connecticut, U.S.
- Party: Republican
- Spouse: Linda Scott (m. 1971; died. 2021)
- Education: Yale University; Boston University School of Law

Daniel Wilcox Jones (January 1, 1945 – May 5, 2026) was an American politician. A member of the Republican Party, he served in the New Hampshire House of Representatives from 1978 to 1980.

== Early life and career ==
Jones was born at the Walter Reed Army Medical Center in Washington, D.C., the son of Edward and Eleanor Jones. He attended and graduated from Choate Rosemary Hall. After graduating, he attended Yale University, earning his degree in art history in 1967, which after earning his degree, he briefly attended Boston University School of Law and served in the United States Army. After his discharge, he returned and graduated from Boston, and was admitted to the bar in Massachusetts.

Jones served in the New Hampshire House of Representatives from 1978 to 1980.

== Personal life and death ==
In 1971, Jones married Linda Scott. Their marriage lasted until her death in 2021.

Jones died in Middlebury, Connecticut on May 5, 2026, at the age of 81.
