= D.A.N. Jones =

British novelist, journalist and critic (1931–2002)

- Born: David Arthur Nicholas Jones; 16 April 1931; Wandsworth, London, England
- Died: 23 November 2002 (aged 71); Woodstock, Oxfordshire, England
- Education: Balliol College, Oxford
- Occupations: Novelist, journalist, theatre and literature critic
- Spouse: Lesley Ann Sillitoe
- Children: 4

David Arthur Nicholas Jones (16 April 1931 – 23 November 2002), known as D.A.N. Jones, was a British novelist and journalist, theatre and literature critic. He wrote two novels, Never Had It So Good (1958) and Parade in Pairs (1963). He was part of the original editorial team at The Black Dwarf, wrote for Tribune and the New Statesman, before becoming a columnist for The Listener and a regular in The Times Literary Supplement, The New York Review of Books and the London Review of Books. He was a lifelong socialist, and campaigner for nuclear disarmament.

== Early life and education ==
Born in Wandsworth, London, he attended Bec Grammar School (later to be Ernest Bevin Comprehensive, and then Academy). He attended Balliol College, Oxford, having won an exhibition, in 1951.

== Life and work ==
Jones did National Service in Hong Kong, then began to work as a reporter on the Oxford Mail.

His first novel, Never Had It So Good, was published in 1958 and the second, Parade in Pairs (based upon Shakespeare's A Midsummer Night's Dream) in 1963, both published by Jonathan Cape. Both books were said to have been admired by Angus Wilson.

Between novels, Jones married Lesley Ann Sillitoe and together they taught for a time in Nigeria, and started a family. They had met on a CND march. There were four children, but the marriage ended in 1988.

Jones began writing for Tribune and the New Statesman, often as "Trooper Jones", helped by the then literary editor, Karl Miller. In 1965, Miller also took him to the BBC journal, The Listener, where Jones reviewed books and theatre, and wrote a regular column, staying with the journal for 20 years.

In 1968, he was appointed editor of The Black Dwarf newspaper, but was ousted from that position prior to the first edition, through objections from other contributors.

Jones served for a time as a Labour councillor for Tulse Hill, Lambeth, in the same period (early 1970s) as John Major and Ken Livingstone. Jones was a lifelong socialist, and campaigner for nuclear disarmament.

In 1975, he was invited, but ultimately refused, to help write the autobiography of Michael X.

Other oddities saw Jones interviewing Robert Maxwell, owner of the Mirror Newspaper Group, on television, shortly before Maxwell's death by drowning, and being invited to meet Saddam Hussein in Iraq for a "writer's conference", where he was to lay a wreath for the Unknown Soldier "on Britain's behalf". Jones was presented with a watch by Saddam featuring Saddam's face.

In the 1960s and 1970s, Jones became a "significant voice in the London literary journalism", described at his death as being "among the outstanding British intellectual journalists of the past 40 years" until a series of strokes, and mental health issues, led to an early retirement, first to the Sussex coast, and then to Woodstock, Oxon.

He died in a house fire in Woodstock in November 2002.

== Publications ==
- Never Had It So Good (Jonathan Cape, 1958), novel
- Parade in Pairs (Jonathan Cape, 1963), novel
