= Francisco Oller Simón =

Spanish-Argentine publisher

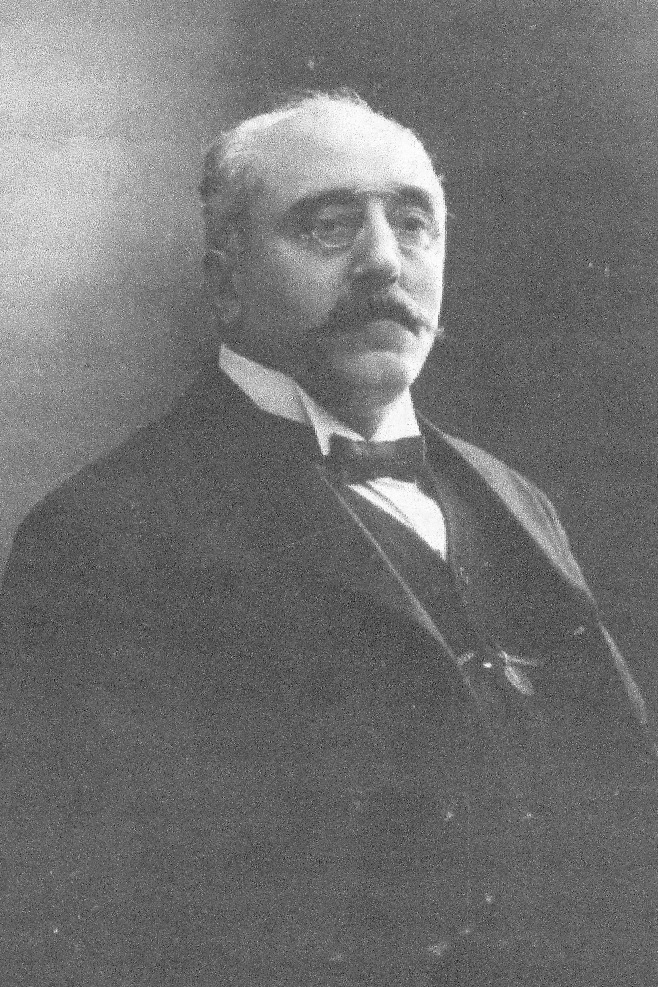
- Born: Francisco Oller Simón; 1860; Barcelona, Spain
- Died: 1940 (aged 79–80); Buenos Aires, Argentina
- Occupations: publisher, lawyer
- Known for: publisher
- Political party: Carlism

Francisco de Paula Oller Simón (1860–1940) was a Spanish and Argentinean publisher. Politically he supported the Carlist cause. He is known mostly as owner, manager and the moving spirit behind numerous Traditionalist periodicals, mostly El Legitimista Español (1898–1912) and España (1915–1929), both published in Buenos Aires. In Spain he briefly issued some Carlist Barcelona-based periodicals in 1889–1892; during this period he managed a publishing house Biblioteca Tradicionalista and published numerous propagandistic books, booklets and brochures. In 1898-1912 he was the chief Carlist representative for South America.

== Family and youth ==
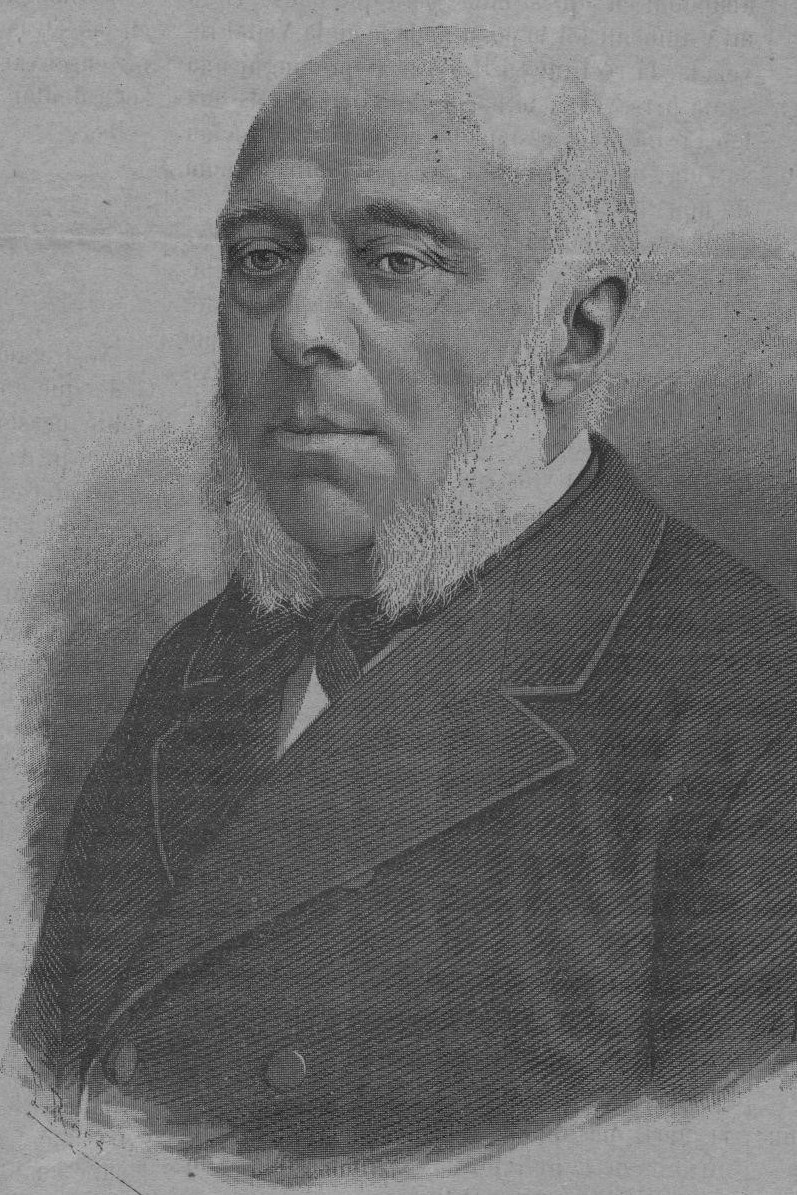
father

The Oller surname, possibly of French origin, was first noted in Spain in Catalan records from the 11th century; however, there is close to nothing known about Oller's distant ancestors. His paternal grandparents were Manuel Oller from Barcelona and Rosa Pallarol from San Vicente dels Horts, yet their social position remains unclear; according to their grandson, they formed a “modest family”. Their son and the father of Francisco, Manuel Oller Pallarol (1810–1888), reportedly followed somewhat chaotic secondary education curriculum and ascended to middle strata, though it is not certain what he was doing for a living. In parish books he was recorded as “propietario” and apparently he had enough financial means to engage in legitimist and Catholic propaganda and charity; fearing his economic contribution to the Carlist war effort, during the Third Carlist War the government embargoed his property. At unspecified date Manuel married Concepción Simón Ramonich (1824–1883), also from Barcelona.

It is not clear how many children Manuel and Concepción had and whether Francisco had any siblings. The family was fervently religious and he was brought up accordingly. He inherited also the Carlist zeal; following outbreak of the Third Carlist War he twice escaped from home trying to enlist in legitimist troops, but failed. The third attempt was successful, and in 1874, as a 14-year-old, he was able to “change my college cap for a Carlist beret”. Francisco's war lasted barely a year; serving in 4. Batallón de Lérida under Ceferino Escola, he took part in defense of Seo de Urgel and was taken prisoner there, according to his own account in the rank of alférez. Back in Barcelona he returned to school and some time in the late 1870s he obtained bachillerato in the local Escuelas Pías. In 1880 he was due to perform military service, evaded by means of regular substitution payment of 2.000 pesetas.

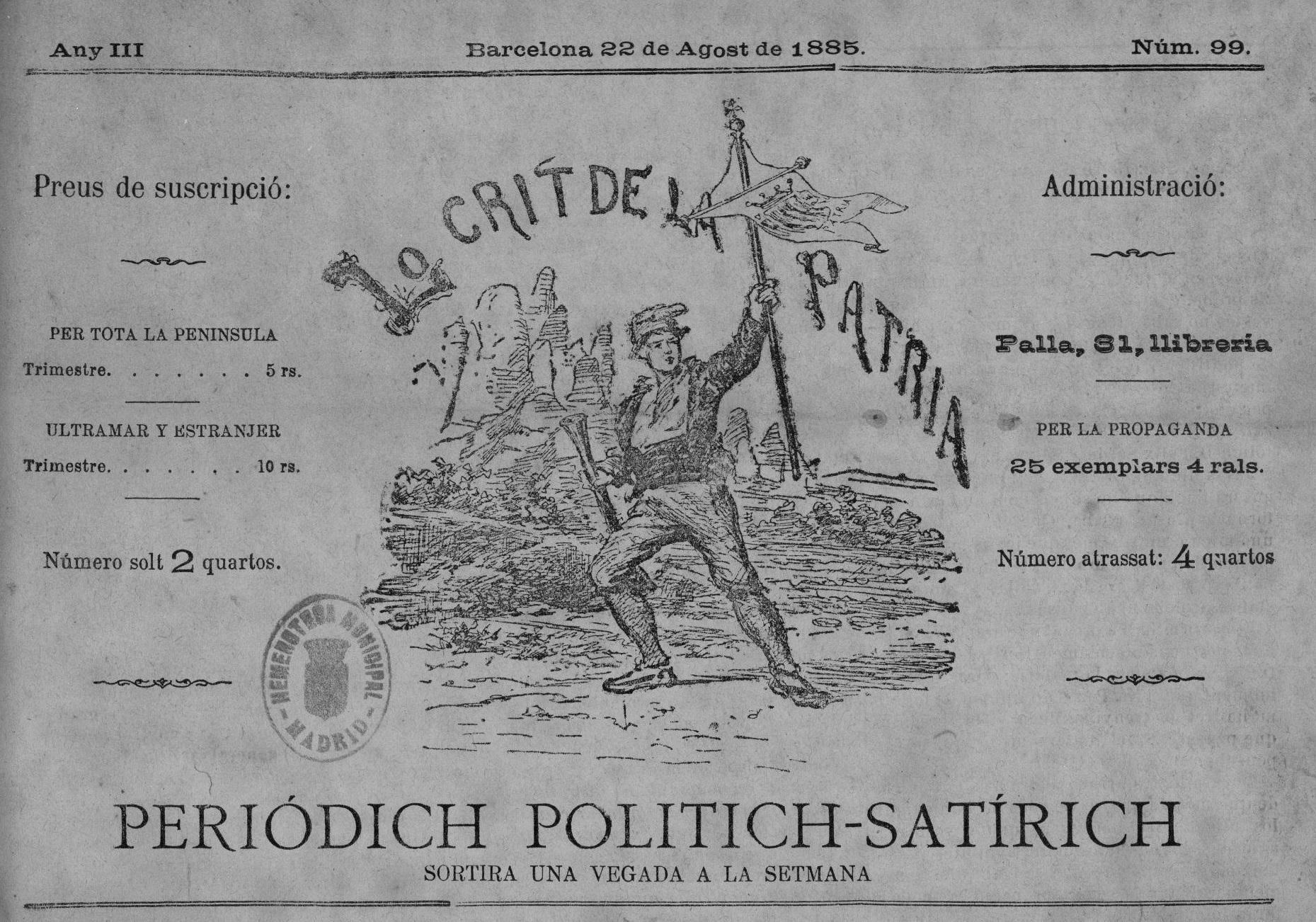
Lo Crit de la Patria

In 1881 in Havana Oller married Carmen Anguis Carmona (1868-?). None of the sources consulted provides any closer information, e.g. it is not known whether the bride was Cuban, in what circumstances the two have met and why Oller travelled across the Atlantic. In 1883 latest the couple resided in Barcelona. Oller entered the editorial board of a freshly launched Catalan-language Carlist weekly, Lo Crit de la Patria; it was owned by Antonio Quintana, a local publisher and owner of the La Propaganda Catalana publishing house. According to some earlier historiographic works Oller founded or co-founded the weekly and himself he claimed having managed it since the early 1880s, but a present-day historian maintains he assumed management somewhat later. Francisco and Carmen lived in Barcelona. It is not clear how many children they had, but there is only one known, Concepción Oller Anguis, born in the late 1880s. She would later marry in Buenos Aires; Oller had one granddaughter, Concepción Amoedo Oller, an Argentinean citizen.

== Spain (1883-1892) ==
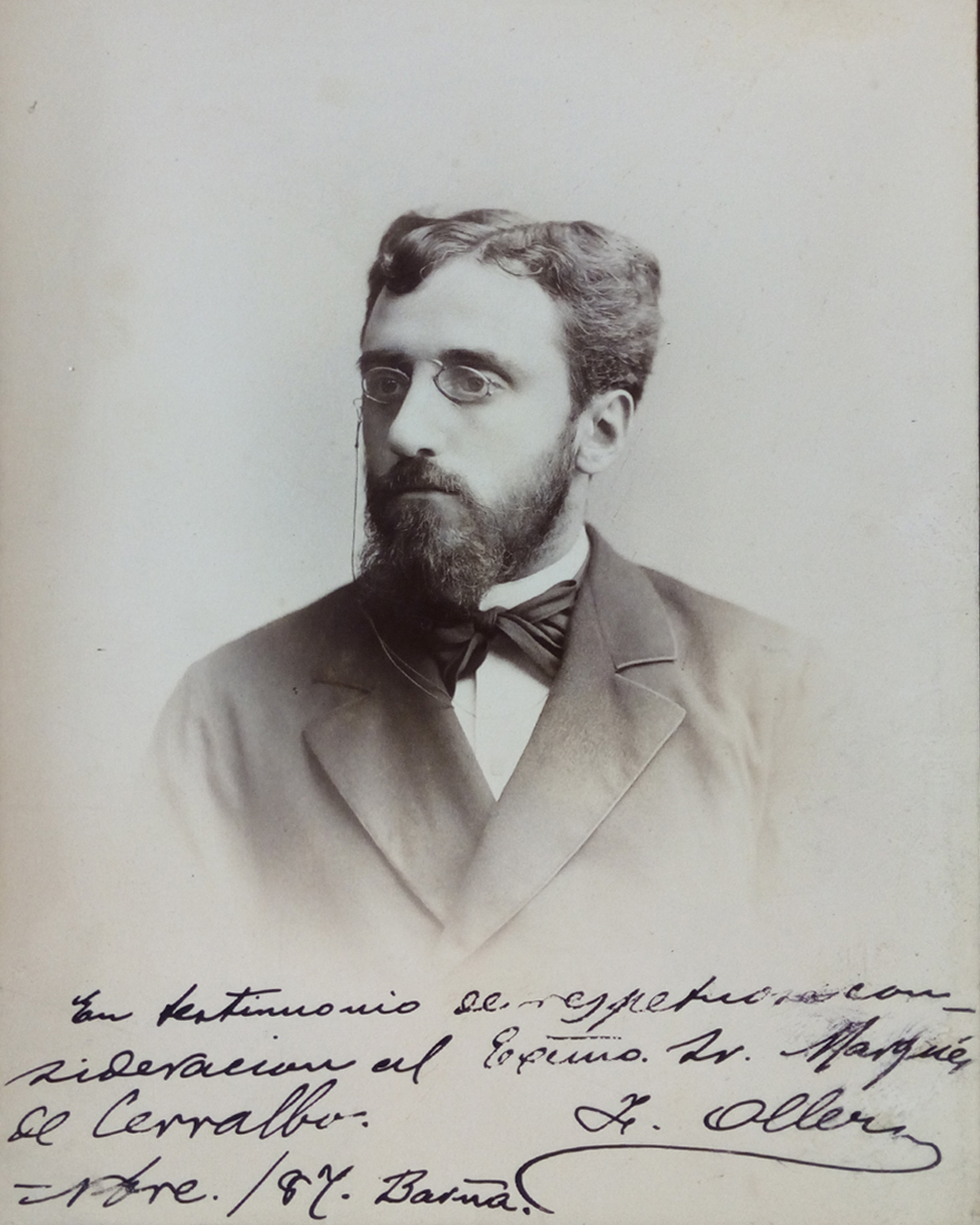
Oller, late 1880s

Except an unsuccessful 1886 attempt to run for Diputación Provincial of Barcelona, Oller focused on propaganda. Apart from a theatrical drama Combates del corazón (1884) he wrote La España Carlista (1885), a set of essays revolving around the Third Carlist War and largely formatted as polemics with Antonio Pirala. He also wrote few prologues and one translation from French. In 1887 he assumed management of Lo Crit de la Patria and steered it as a vehement Carlist propaganda vehicle, publishing venomous diatribes against the Madrid governments. However, in 1888 he faced a conflict within Traditionalist ranks, caused by secession of Nocedal-led faction named Integrists. Quintana assumed ambiguous stand, and Oller suspended his collaboration having declared that “l’estat de la lluyta actual dins lo partit carlista” makes him re-consider. Eventually, when Lo Crit de la Patria sided with the rebels, Oller opted for total loyalty to his king and left the periodical.

Though no longer behind the steering wheel of Lo Crit, in 1888 Oller was subject to legal investigation related to articles, published earlier during his tenure. Apart from open exaltation of Carlos de Borbón as the king, he was also charged with barely veiled reference to the prime minister Sagasta as “canalla”. The matter was examined in various courts, and following numerous appeals he got two sentences for the total of 7 months of incarceration and the fine of 4.000 pesetas; he spend the period between June 1888 and January 1889 behind bars. Once set free he was immediately invited by the claimant to Venice, where he spent some time later that year; he declared himself “un enamorado de la figura política del Rey Carlos VII”.

In 1889 Oller founded a Barcelona-based publishing house, Biblioteca Tradicionalista (BT). In 1889 BT launched two periodicals. A weekly Lo Crit d’Espanya was sort of continuation of Lo Crit de la Patria and assumed similar, belligerent stand; a monthly El Estandarte Real was formatted as “revista politico-militar ilustrada”, mostly dedicated to Carlist heroic past. In 1891 BT started to publish a third periodical, a satirical irregular La Carcajada. All featured high graphical standards, ensured by artistic management of Paciano Ross. BT published also portraits of Carlos VII and his family members; some as large as 58x83 cm, they were decorating walls of Carlist circulos.

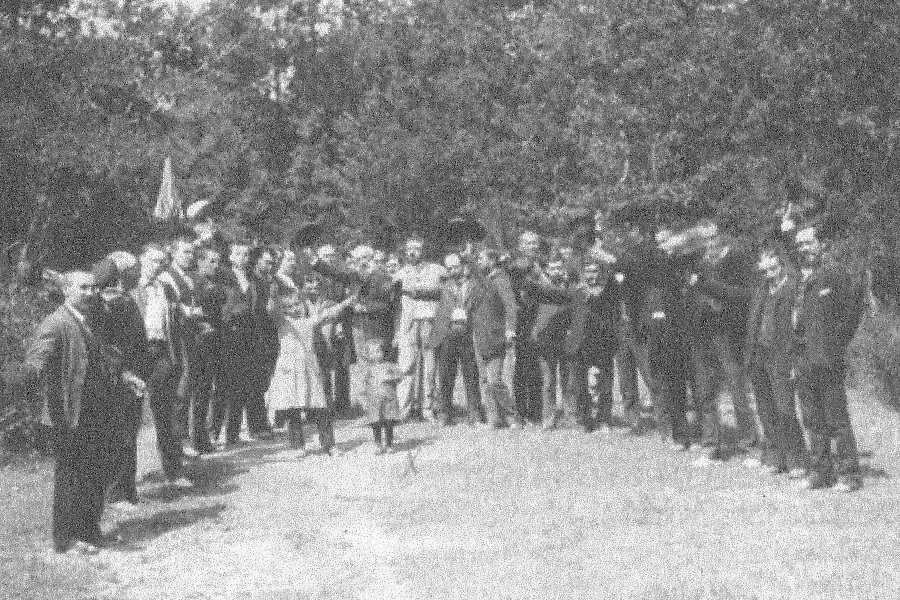
Oller (centre, white suit) during Carlist event in Manlleu, 1890

In 1889–1892 as part of Carlist propaganda machinery BT published some 20 books, booklets and brochures; they included ideological treaties, historiography, poetry, military manuals and other by various authors, including Ramiro Fernandez Valbuena, Joaquin Llorens, Modesto Hernandez Villaescusa, José de Liñan and Reynaldo Brea. Oller's flagship product, however, was Album de personajes carlistas, a 600-page set of 75 biographies he has written himself, again illustrated by Ross. First two volumes, published in 1887–1888, were released by Quintana; Oller purchased publishing rights and in 1890 BT issued the third volume. Highly apologetic and at times missing substance, until today the publication remains a valuable historiographic source.

== Financial disaster ==
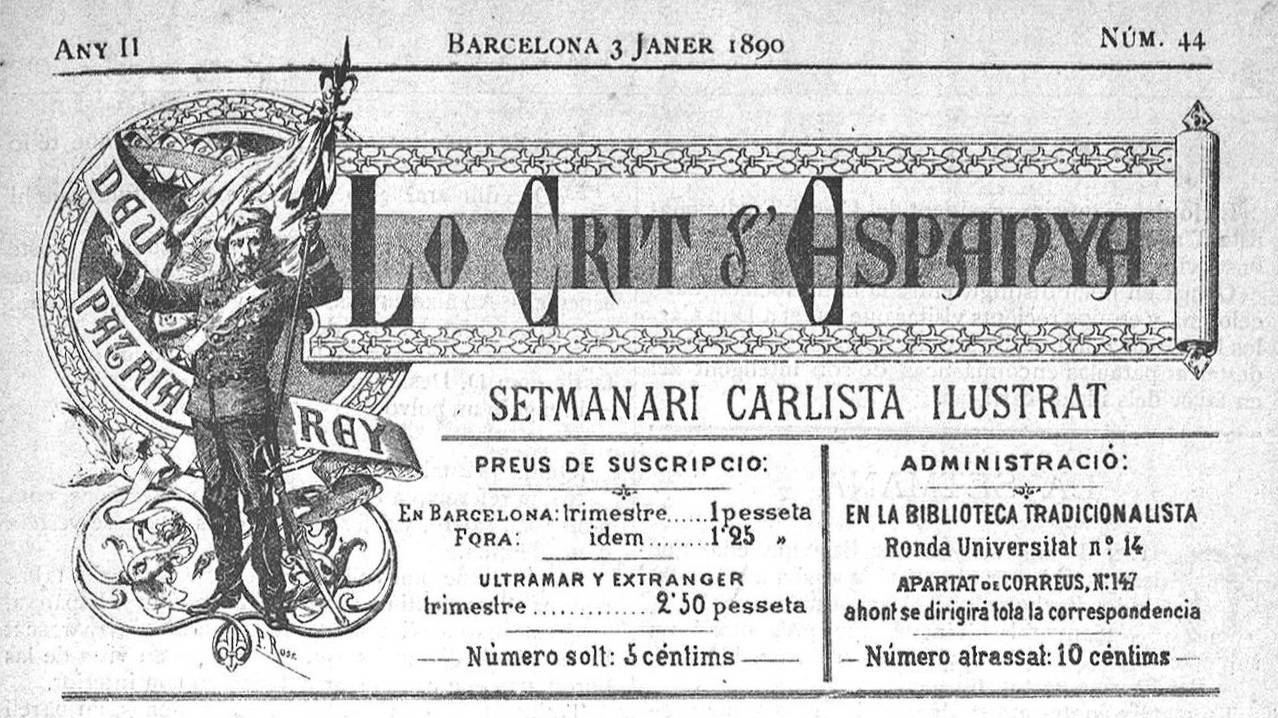
Lo Crit d'Espanya

Biblioteca Tradicionalista was a broadly-scaled publishing house, which for a few years kept issuing 3 periodicals and tens of books. However, its commercial performance was at best moderate. At the time there were 3 somewhat competitive Carlist publishing houses in Barcelona, the other two having been La Hormiga de Oro (Luis Llauder) and La Biblioteca Regional (Josep Font Fargas, Joan M. Roma). Circulation of BT-issued periodicals was between 500 and 2000 copies, barely sufficient to render the exercise economically viable. Even though the company tried various activities – e.g. Oller was Spanish representative of Rafael Díez de la Cortina and his Cortina Method of learning foreign languages - it was barely making profit.

According to Oller, his problems were aggravated by other factors. He allegedly made some business decisions when trusting in promises of support and financial engagement on part of various individuals, the assistance which has never materialized; some claimed that he was “abandonado por los suyos, sin ayuda ni auxilio”. Oller referred also hostile official administrative measures, including censorship interventions and heavy fines; the 4.000 ptas fine administered against him was equal to annual salary of a junior university professor. In 1891 the claimant Carlos VII prohibited opening one more Carlist periodical in Barcelona; the intention was to spare competition to Oller. Oller later confessed that he spent almost all inheritance from his late father to sustain the business, but the money have eventually run out. What happened later is not exactly clear; in 1892 either the business went bust or he sold it at a very low price. The younger brother of the claimant, Alfonso Carlos, offered 2.000 ptas from his own money, but it was too little too late.

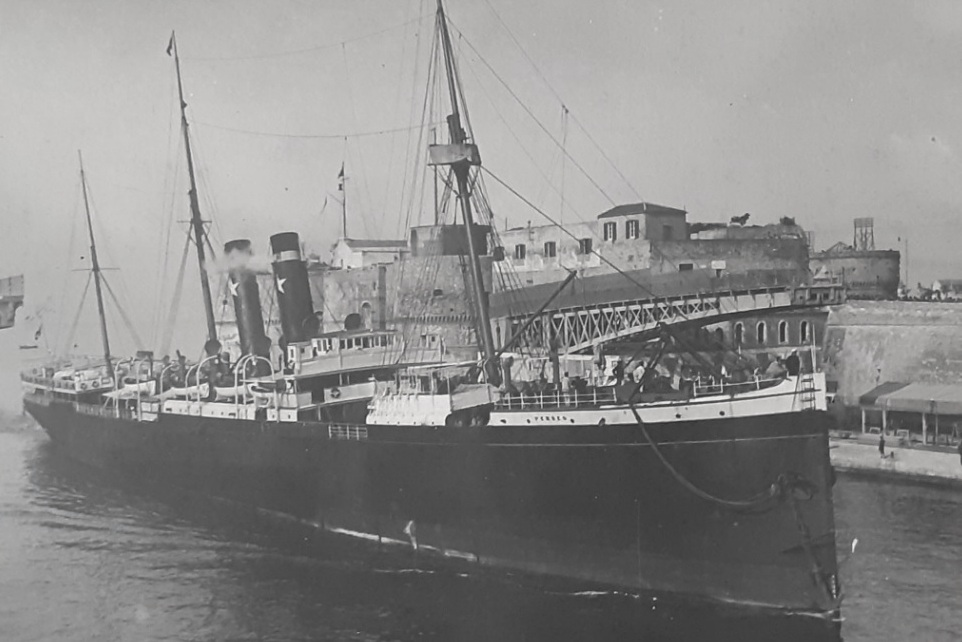
Perseo

Closure of BT was passed over in silence by the Carlist press, though the republican one cheered its demise, especially that all 3 periodicals issued by BT ceased to appear. Having learnt that he intended to leave for America, the republicans ridiculed Oller. In 1892 he sold most of his belongings, though it is not clear how the money has been spent, as he later declared having left Spain with merely 2 pounds sterling of his entire capital. Neither any source clarifies why he decided to launch a new life overseas and not in Spain, and in particular whether he was fleeing unpaid debts. In October 1892 Oller, his wife and his daughter boarded an Italian liner Perseo and departed for Argentina; 3 weeks later they arrived in Buenos Aires. Apart from the small capital mentioned, he was carrying some memorabilia from the wartime past, including a Remington rifle, a sabre, a spade and a red beret.

== Argentina: early years (1892-1908) ==
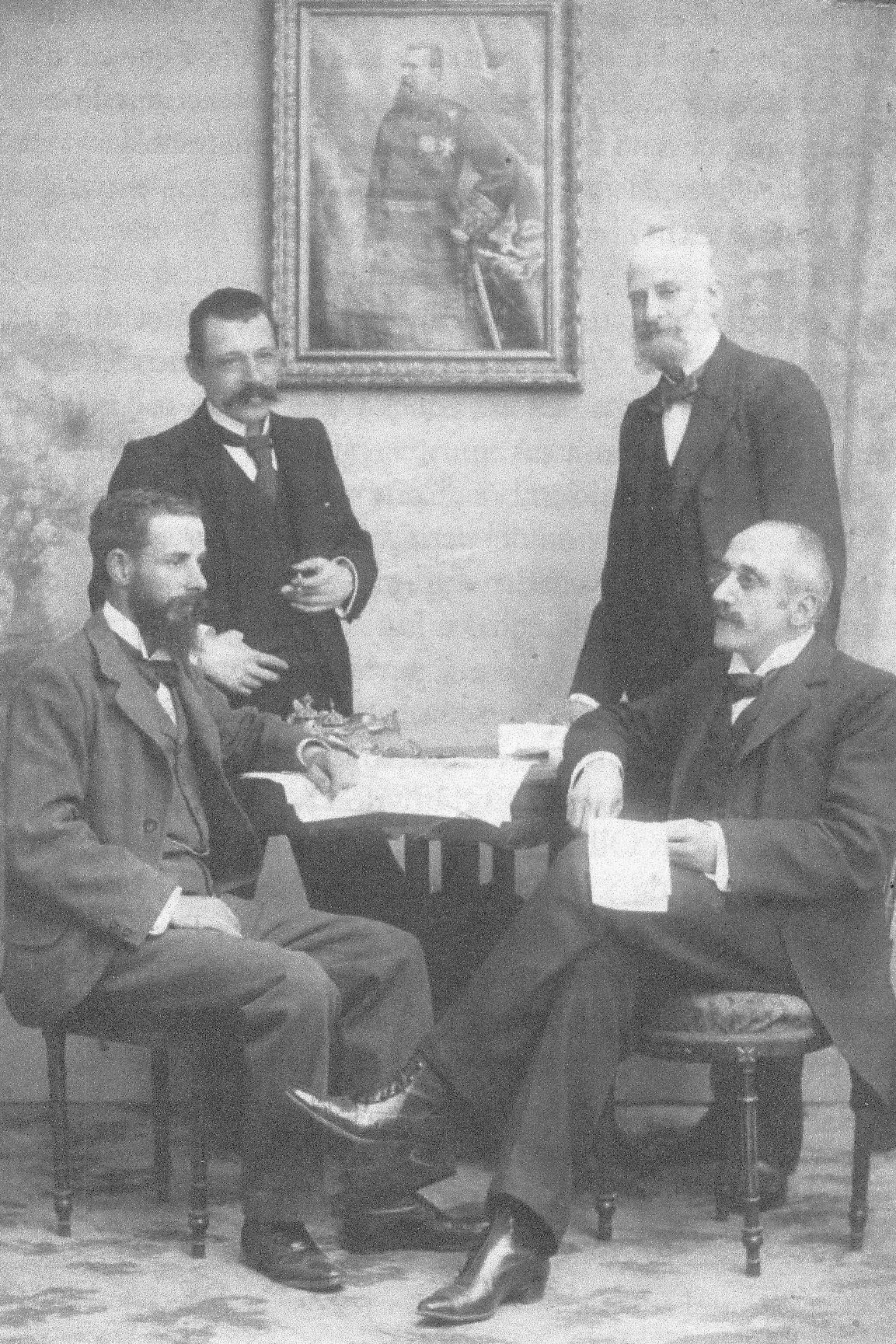
Oller (sitting 1fR) with collaborators, late 1890s

Shortly after arrival in Buenos Aires Oller found an office job in Casa de Comercio, which he would hold for 16 years to come. According to his own account most of the 1890s was a difficult time; thought not in poverty, he had to work hard, especially that his wife was under constant medical treatment. However, he found some time to pursue interest in letters; in 1896 his historiographic booklet España en el mundo earned him primer premio de prosa in Juegos Florales del Centro Unión Obrera Española, and in 1897 he published Certamen Franciscano Literario y Artístico, follow-up of cultural event organized by the local Franciscans. Francisco Melgar, the secretary of the claimant, in epistolographic exchange encouraged Oller to resume propagandistic activities; the 1898 personal letter from Carlos VII was written to the same purpose; also, the claimant nominated Oller his representative in Southern America. Oller set up Comisión Central de Propaganda Carlista en la América del Sud; its branches appeared in Uruguay, Bolivia, Paraguay, Peru and Ecuador.

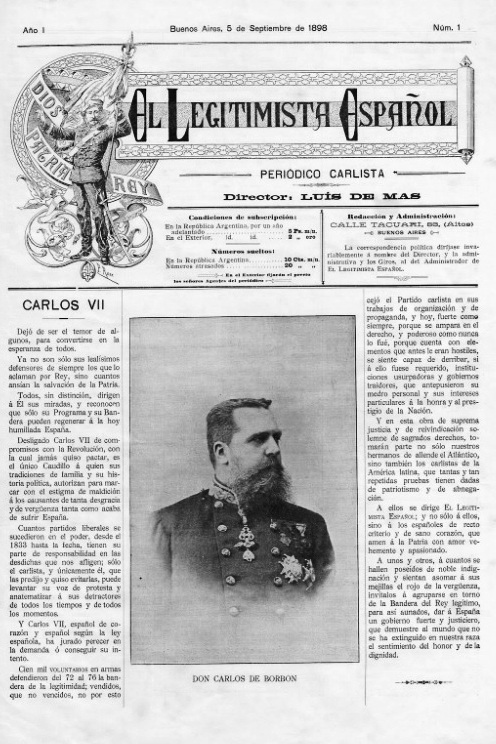
El Legitimista Español, issue from 1898

In 1898 Oller launched El Legitimista Español, initially a bi-weekly and then a monthly; 174 issues would be published until its closure in 1912. Usually a 4-page print, at times it went out in 8, 10 or even more pages. Its director was Luis Mas Nadal, the son of former Oller's commander from the Third Carlist War, yet historians agree that it was Oller who remained the spiritus movens of the periodical; he formally assumed directorship in 1908. El Legitimista was welcome enthusiastically by the Carlist community; the infant Don Jaime sent greetings from his garrison in Warsaw. Oller envisioned a grand scheme, with offices in every South American capital; eventually El Legitimista remained a local Buenos Aires paper, with 300 subscribers and sales of some 2.500 copies. The weekly adhered to orthodox Carlist line, which gained him hostility of another Spanish bonaerense periodical, El Correo Español. The latter represented the “el adentro”, Argentina-focused perspective; El Legitmista was rather “del afuera”, with much attention to Spain.

At some point in the early 1900s Oller either founded or co-founded Centro de Publicidad Universal Lux, a Buenos-Aires-based publishing house which took over issuing of El Legitimista. It briefly published also La Hispano-Argentina, an ambitious cultural review with tuned town Carlist tone and formatted rather as a generic Catholic periodical. Centro de Publicidad Universal became a fairly successful enterprise. Its offices, just like premises of El Legitimista, were moved to Avenida Belgrano 1658, an excellent point in the Buenos Aires financial quarter. They hosted a store, which apart from books and press sold tobacco, perfumes, pharmaceuticals and other ware. The spacious Belgrano office was also accommodating numerous social events co-organized by Oller, like conferences, banquets, lectures, celebrations of Carlist feasts etc., at times gathering as much as 200 participants.

== Argentina: climax and crisis (1908-1912) ==
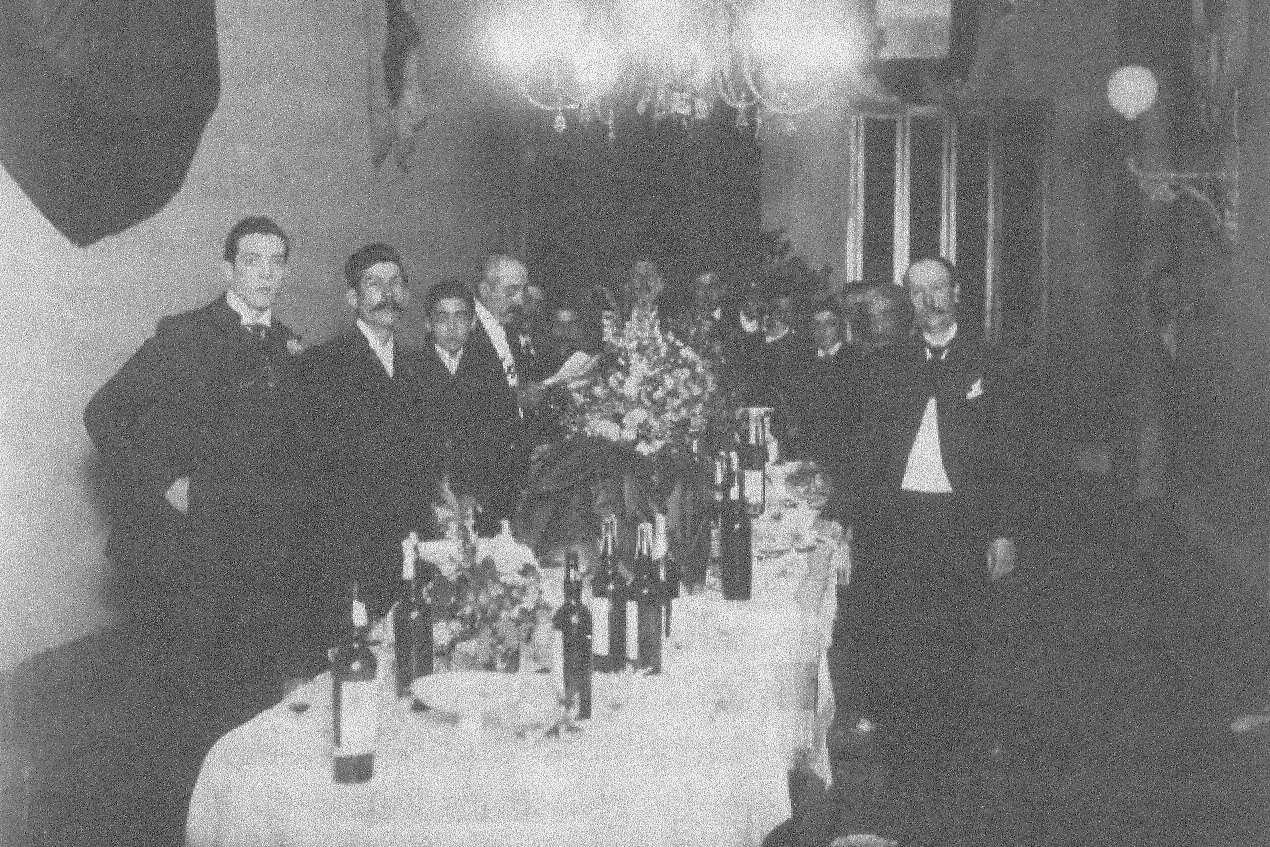
banquet at Centro de Publicidad Universal (Oller 4fL), 1900s

The turn of decades marked a climax in Oller's Argentinean career. Centro Universal became a recognized institution. He emerged as a personality in right-wing Spanish circles of Buenos Aires, receiving homages by organisations like Juventud Carlista and Juventud Católica; he became the president of the latter. He opened a bookstore named La Enciclopedia. In 1907 jointly with F. Rainieri he published Manual práctico de cálculos mercantiles, result of his practice in Casa de Comercio and studies at the University of Buenos Aires, which he pursued at times as regular and at times as free student. He specialized in commercial law; his academic career was crowned in 1908, when Oller graduated at Facultad de Derecho y Ciencias Sociales thanks to a dissertation Libros de comercio, promoted by Silvestre H. Blousson. Since then he advertised in the press as “Francisco P. de Oller. Abogado”.

In 1908 Oller set up a company, Empresa Edificadora Villa Loredán SA. Its objective was to build an entirely new settlement, Villa Loredán; the name was taken from the residence of Carlos VII in Venice. It was supposed to be a Carlist-only place, with streets named after Carlist heroes. In 1909 the statute and board membership were published; Oller became presidente interino. Financial details are highly unclear; except possible link to Banco de Galicia y Buenos Aires, there were no large companies involved and capital was to be raised by sales of shares. However, in late 1909 and quoting “obstáculos imprevistos e insalvables”, the company was dissolved. The project was scaled down. In 1910 El Legimista was advertising plots in Villa España, a future settlement in Quilmes, half-way between Buenos Aires and La Plata; the intention was to build residential estates, named Villa Loredán, Villa Jaime III, etc. None of them has been constructed; the only remnant of the project was a street named "calle Carlos VII". In 1961, when the Berazategui borough separated from Quilmes, all street names were changed, and "calle Carlos VII" became "calle 152".

Carlist standard

Following failed construction project another blow came in 1912. Its dynamics is unclear. Oller's bookstore La Enciclopedia re-arranged its display windows as sort of Carlist exhibition, with books, portraits, decorations and other memorabilia, some from his private collection. This triggered protests by members of the bonaerense Spanish community, with reportedly “thousands of people” involved; some of them were getting violent with risk of the bookstore being vandalized. It is unclear whether the official administration or police demanded removal of the exhibition, but this is what has occurred shortly. Afterwards El Legitimista printed an editorial note; it claimed that because of “recent events” and with the intention to prevent damages “to legitimist cause in America”, the board decided to suspend publication of the weekly. Present day historian when referring the story chooses not to offer any speculations, except that Oller's law practice might have been at stake. He soon moved his law office to another, more peripheral location. Also, in 1912 Oller resigned as Don Jaime's representative for South America.

== Argentina: late years (1912-1940) ==
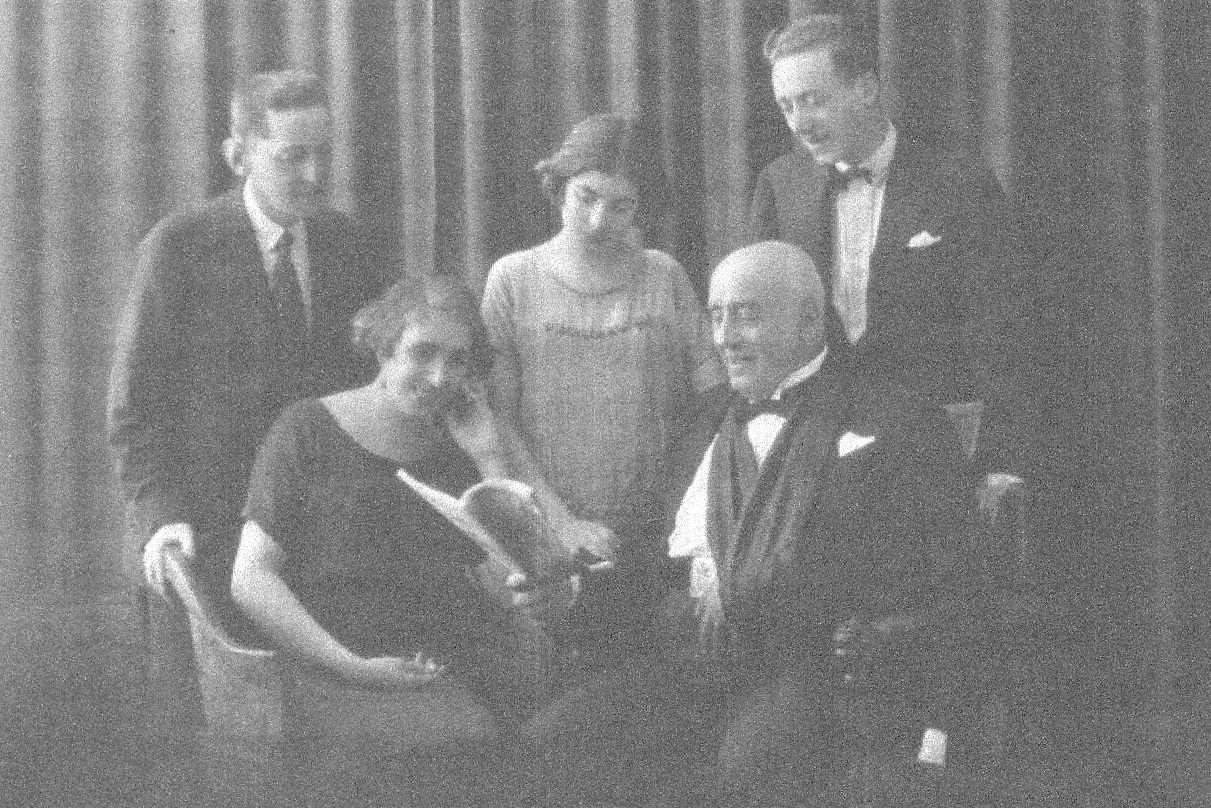
Oller (sitting) with family, mid-1920s

After 1912 Oller for 3 years was not managing any periodical. However, he set his eyes on España, a review launched 4 years earlier by a group of Spanish migrants and struggling. In 1915 and in unclear circumstances he took it over and re-branded as “revista patriótica española”. According to a historian the periodical did not assume an openly Carlist format, posing rather as a paper of Spaniards in South America, yet to some readers it was sort of continuation of El Legitimista, but with more pages and more adverts. Though its office was at a peripheral calle Azul 248, the monthly would remain on the market for 14 years. For some time, during the First World War, it adopted a sub-title of “Revista hispano-germanófila”, a clear mark of Oller's support for the German Empire and his anti-British stand. Very briefly in 1917 he managed to resurrect El Legitimista, this time as “periódico Jaimista”; only 5 issues appeared and the title was discontinued with a declaration that “political circumstances which justified its re-appearance have ceased”.

In 1918 Oller was granted the Argentinean citizenship; it was not required of an abogado, but remained a must in case of a notary, which might not have been irrelevant for the 58-year-old. It is known he visited Spain, though unclear when. He also maintained epistolographic exchange with numerous Spanish correspondents. It was particularly cordial when writing with Jaime de Orbe, barón de Montevilla, from the iconic Carlist Valde-Espina family; in his last will, Oller decided Orbe would take over his Carlism-related heritage. In the mid-1920s Orbe started subscriptions for a luxurious homage book, which materialized in 1928; Oller was very moved upon receiving it. At the time he was already suffering from poor health and unspecified family problems, perhaps related to death of his son-in-law and his daughter remaining on her own; he quoted above reasons when closing España in 1929. However, as an insatiable publisher in 1931 he launched Monarquía Española, an irregular political-literary review; it closed in 1932.

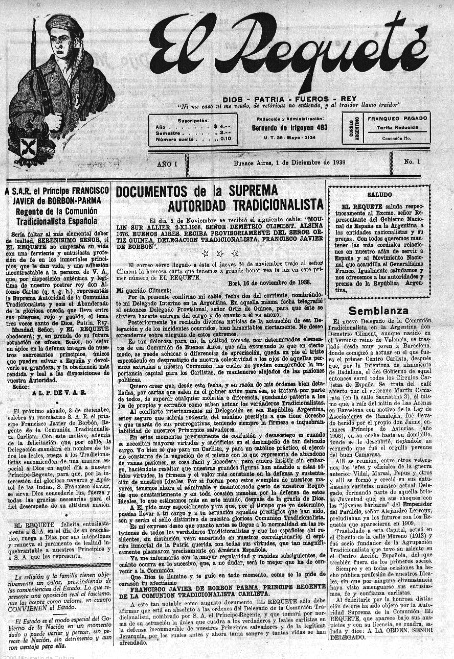
El Requeté

During the Spanish civil war Oller clearly sided with the Nationalists. However, his focus was on their Traditionalist component, and he made some last propaganda efforts, intended to sustain the Carlist cause. He published 2 brochures, largely excerpts from his 1928 homage book, Dios-Patria-Rey. Laureles a Un Carlista (1936) and Dios-Patria-Rey. Más Laureles a Un Carlista (1937). In 1938 he launched Boletín Tradicionalista, published until after his death, and another one, titled El Requeté, which appeared briefly. Oller rejected the Franco-imposed unification decree and kept underlying the Carlist identity of “soldados de la Fe, Cruzados de Cristo”; in return, the Falange Española Tradicionalista Secretaría General ordered its foreign section to monitor Oller as a suspicious individual. In 1939 he attended the Buenos Aires celebrations of the Carlist Mártires de la Tradición ceremony, with an empty seat reserved for representative of the Spanish government.

== See also ==
- Traditionalism
- Carlism
- Lo Crit de la Patria
- Lo Crit d'Espanya
- El Legitimista Español
