= Daniel L. Jones =

American politician

Member of the Illinois House of Representatives
- In office 1852–1854

Daniel L. Jones was an American politician who served as a member of the Illinois House of Representatives. He served as a state representative for the 7th District representing White county in the 18th Illinois General Assembly.
