= William H. Christy =

American politician

Member of the Illinois House of Representatives
- In office 1852–1854

William H. Christy was an American politician who served as a member of the Illinois House of Representatives. He served as a state representative for the 9th District representing Lawrence and Richland counties in the 18th Illinois General Assembly.
