= Daniel Jones (dancer) =

Daniel Jones is an English dancer, choreographer and film producer who has been a member of the English National Ballet since 1992. He produced and choreographed Men in Tights, a documentary about a group of shipbuilders from Newcastle upon Tyne who were given the opportunity to perform a ballet for the first time in their lives in front of their friends and family, broadcast in 2003. Jones has his own company, Soloist Limited. His career highlights include creating a role in Mauro Bigonzetti's Symphonic Dances and performing Tybalt at the Rod Laver Arena in Melbourne, Australia.

Daniel Jones was twice awarded the Kenneth MacMillan prize for choreography. Between October 2002 and April 2009, he wrote a blog at the Ballet.co web site.
