= Multi-platform television =

Mode of storytelling across many mediums

Multi-platform television (also known as multiplatform entertainment and transmedia storytelling) is "a mode of storytelling that plays itself out across multiple entertainment channels". Each medium that the story unfolds across makes a distinctive contribution.

Big Brother 2001 was an early multi-platform television-based project.

Big Brother has been a series of multi-platform, cross-promotional world media events centered on television, with claims to technical, cultural, broadcasting, Internet, advertising, marketing, and even management innovation. It was accessible in the traditional way on free-to-air, via the official Big Brother website with discussion forums, on unofficial fan sites. It was catchable via radio updates. There was telephone voting, SMS updates to mobiles, and in the UK, there was live coverage and unedited rushes on a digital channel in Britain up to 18 hours a day.

The most successful transmedia franchises have emerged when a single creator or creative unit maintains control. One notable example is Lucasfilm, which has managed and cultivated its Indiana Jones (1981) and Star Wars (1977) franchises.

When Indiana Jones went to television, for example, it exploited the medium’s potential for extended storytelling and character development: The Young Indiana Jones Chronicles (1992) showed the character take shape against the backdrop of various historical events and exotic environments. When Star Wars moved into print, its novels expanded the timeline to show events not contained in the film triplogies, or recast the stories around secondary characters, as did The Tales from the Mos Eisley Cantina (1995) series, which fleshes out those curious-looking aliens in the background of the original movie. When Star Wars went to games, those games didn’t just enact film events; they showed what life would be like for a Jedi trainee or a bounty hunter. Increasingly, elements are dropped into the films to create openings that will be fully exploited only through other media.

While the technological infrastructure is ready, the economic prospects sweet, and the audience primed, the media industries haven’t done a very good job of collaborating to produce compelling transmedia experiences. Even within the media conglomerates, units compete aggressively rather than collaborate. Many believe that much greater coordination across the media sectors is needed to produce transmedia content.

== Today ==
NBC’s The Office is one example of how networks are expanding their television series to become “multi-platform.” Different characters and story arcs are able to be explored through their website and webisodes.
The national broadcasters of Belgium (VRT) and Sweden (SVT) are developing the first pan-European multiplatform project named The Artists. This is based on the newly developed drama 2.0 format.

== Sources ==
- Henry Jenkins, Convergence Culture: Where Old and New Media Collide, New York University Press 2006
- Mark Gawlinski, Interactive Television Production, Focal Press, 2003
- Janet Wasko, A Companion to Television, Blackwell Publishing, 2005
- Trevor Slack, The Commercialisation of Sport, Routledge, 2004
- Martin Cave, Kiyoshi Nakamura, Digital Broadcasting: Policy and Practice in the Americas, Europe and Japan, Edward Elgar Publishing, 2006
