= The You Generation =

Online video-sharing competition

- Genre: Entertainment
- Created by: Simon Cowell
- Country of origin: United Kingdom

Production
- Production companies: YouTube, Base79, Syco Entertainment

Original release
- Network: YouTube
- Release: 20 March 2013 – 2014

The You Generation is an online video-sharing competition launched by Simon Cowell in partnership with YouTube. It comprises a series of themed competitions where contestants can upload videos to win prizes. A new contest runs every two weeks with a grand prize at the end of the year. It was launched in 2013 featuring an interview with the British boy band One Direction.

== Creation ==
According to Cowell, The You Generation was created because "YouTube is the biggest video channel in the world, but real stars can get lost in the mix because there are more than 72 hours of footage uploaded every minute." The channel was started to search for "unconventional" and "original" people with "outstanding skills."

== The Competition ==
The You Generation consists of a series of themed competitions where contestants can compete to win a cash prize. The You Generation is available in 15 languages and 26 countries. A new contest runs every two weeks for a prize of $2000. The grand prize, to be awarded at the end of the year is $75,000. The contests are centred on themes like "male vocalist," "impressionist" or "stylist."

In 2014 Make-up Artist Joseph Harwood won the competition.

== The Channel ==
The You Generation YouTube Channel was launched in 2013 with a livestreamed interview of British boy band One Direction. Since then, celebrities such as Kimberly Wyatt and Demi Lovato have been featured on the channel.

The channel was created as a part of the YouTube Original Channels Initiative. As of August 2013, the channel has over 450,000 subscribers and 8 million all time views.

NÜKO were responsible for the design of the channel. According to NÜKO associate director Emily Torjussen "They wanted something quite different, so it wasn’t to look like the X-Factor, as it isn’t on television, and it also needed to encourage participatory involvement. It’s playing on the idea of the audience building their own world of talent and has an almost home made look – stylish but not too perfect."

== See also ==
- Multi Channel Network
- Base79
