= Kerk =

Kerk or KERK may refer to:

- Kerk (surname)
- USS Sterope (AK-96), US Navy cargo ship (code letters: KERK)

== Places in Iran ==
Also rendered as Korak (Persian: كرك):

- Kerk, Hamadan
- Kerk, Kerman
- Kerk, Markazi
- Korak, Semnan

== See also ==
- Groote Kerk (disambiguation)
- Grote Kerk (disambiguation)
- Nieuwe Kerk (disambiguation)
- Oude Kerk (disambiguation)
