= Quek =

Family surname

- Language: German, Middle English, Southern Min Chinese

Origin
- Meaning: Chinese: 'city walls'; English: 'nimble', 'lively'

Other names
- Variant forms: Chinese: Guo, Kek, Kerk, Kuek, Kweh, Kwek; English: Quick; German: Queck, Quecke, Quäck

Quek is a Chinese, English, and German surname.

== Origins ==
The English surname Quek is an alternative spelling of Quick, which originated from Middle English quek and earlier Old English cwic, both meaning 'lively' or 'nimble'. Quex and Quekes, toponymic surnames referring to Quex in Kent, are derived from Quek plus the English possessive marker s.

As a Chinese surname, Quek is found in Southeast Asia among Overseas Chinese communities in Malaysia and in Singapore as an approximation of Southern Min pronunciations of the surname whose Standard Mandarin pronunciation is spelled in Hanyu Pinyin as Guō (郭). Other Southern Min-derived spellings of the same surname include Kek, Kerk, Kuek, Kweh, and Kwek.

The German surname Quek is a variant spelling of Queck, which is usually derived from Middle High German quec, kec, köc, koc, koch or Middle Low German kek, keck 'lively'. In some cases it may have originated as an occupational surname for a farmer or a cattle dealer, from quek 'living animal'. Despite the similarity in spelling, based on the geographic distribution of the surname within Germany, it is generally believed to be unrelated to the placename Queck in Hesse.

== Statistics ==
The 2010 United States census found 167 people with the surname Quek, making it the 105,670th-most-common name in the country. This represented an increase from 127 people (124,872nd-most-common) in the 2000 Census. In both censuses, about five percent of the bearers of the surname identified as non-Hispanic white, and about nine-tenths as non-Hispanic Asian or Pacific Islander.

== People ==
- Quek Kee Siong (郭祺祥; c. 1936 – after 1980), Singaporean man executed for the murder of Cheng Geok Ha
- Quek Leng Chan (郭令灿; born 1941), Malaysian businessman
- Quek Swee Hwa (郭瑞华; born 1941), Singaporean pastor
- Quek Loo Ming (郭禄明; born 1945), Singaporean former laboratory officer and convicted killer
- Deborah Evans-Quek (born 1961), Welsh chess player
- Justin Quek (郭文秀; born 1962), Singaporean chef
- Phyllis Quek (郭妃丽; born 1972), Malaysian model
- Grace Quek (郭盈恩; born c. 1972), Singaporean pornographic actress who used the stage name Annabel Chong
- Jill Quek (born 1978), Singaporean footballer
- Quek See Ling (郭诗玲; born 1986), Singaporean writer
- Sam Quek (born 1988), English field hockey player
- Calvin Quek (born 1996), Singaporean sprinter
