= Quex =

Quex may refer to:

- Quex Park, together with Quex House in Kent, England
- Nickname of Herbert Norkus (1916-1932), Hitler Youth member martyred in Nazi Germany,
  - Nickname of Heini Völker, who depicts Norkus in the novel Der Hitlerjunge Quex
- Lord Quex from The Gay Lord Quex (multiple meanings)
- Quex, fictional character from Paradise (1926 film)

== See also ==
- Quex-Ul, DC Comics supervillain
- Quek
