= Quick (surname) =

Quick is a surname. Notable people and characters with the surname include:

People

- Bob Quick (basketball) (born 1946), American basketball player
- Bob Quick (police officer), British police officer
- Brian Quick (born 1989), American football player
- Chris Quick (born 1988), Scottish film editor
- Diana Quick (born 1946), English actress
- Doug Quick (born 1954), American broadcast weatherman, author and museum curator
- Edward Quick (1935–2016), American politician
- Eldon Quick (born 1937), American character actor, an alumnus of the American Shakespeare Festival
- Frederick James Quick (1836–1902), English coffee merchant and philanthropist
- Glenys Quick (born 1957), New Zealand long-distance runner
- Harry Quick (born 1941), Australian politician
- Jerry Quick (born 1963), American football player
- Jim Quick (born 1943), Major League Baseball umpire
- John Quick (disambiguation), several people
- Jonathan Quick (born 1986), American National Hockey League goaltender
- Joseph Quick (Medal of Honor) (1877–1969), United States Navy coxswain awarded the Medal of Honor
- Kevin Quick (born 1988), American ice hockey defenseman
- Mike Quick (born 1959), American National Football League player
- Preston Quick (born 1978), American squash player
- Rebecca Quick (born 1972), American television journalist/newscaster
- Richard Quick (1943–2009), American swimming coach
- Robert Hebert Quick (1831–1891), English educator and writer on education
- Simon P. Quick (1850–1927), American lumber businessman, hotelier, and politician
- Terence Quick (born 1947), Greek journalist and politician
- Thomas Quick (disambiguation), several people
- Winnifred Quick (1904–2002), one of the last four survivors of the sinking of RMS Titanic in 1912

Fictional characters

- Jesse Quick, original name of Jesse Chambers, a DC Comics character
- Johnny Quick, two distinct DC Comics characters
- one of the title characters of Quick & Flupke, a comic book series by Belgian cartoonist Hergé
- Little Miss Quick, a Little Miss character
- Oliver Quick, protagonist of the 2023 film Saltburn
