= Philip Satterthwaite =

British Old Testament scholar

Philip E. Satterthwaite is a British Old Testament scholar. He has been principal of Biblical Graduate School of Theology since 2011, succeeding Quek Swee Hwa to that position.

== Education ==
Satterthwaite obtained degrees from the University of Oxford and the University of Cambridge before obtaining a PhD from the University of Manchester. Working under the supervision of Barnabas Lindars, his thesis was Narrative Artistry and the Composition of Judges 17-21 (1989).

== Ministry ==
Satterthwaite was Assistant Editor of Tyndale Bulletin between 1993 and 1998.

Academic offices
| Preceded by Quek Swee Hwa | Principal of the Biblical Graduate School of Theology; 2011–present | Incumbent |
