= BGST =

BGST may refer to:

- Saattut Heliport (ICAO Code: BGST)
- Biblical Graduate School of Theology
