= Bible-Presbyterian Church (Singapore) =

Denomination in Singapore

- Classification: Protestant
- Orientation: Presbyterian, Fundamentalist, Evangelical
- Origin: 1955 (71 years ago); Singapore
- Separated from: Say Mia Tng (Presbyterian denomination)
- Defunct: 1988 (38 years ago)
- Congregations: 40 (as of 2024)
- Members: 30,000

The Bible-Presbyterian Church ("BPC") was a conservative reformed denomination in Singapore. It existed from 1955 to 1988, following the history of the country, as the Bible-Presbyterian Church of Malaya, then the Bible-Presbyterian Church of Singapore and Malaysia, and finally the Bible Presbyterian Church of Singapore ("BPCOS") (with the then eight Malaysian BP churches in 1985 to register themselves in Malaysia thereafter) before the BPCOS dissolved in 1988. Since that time, Bible-Presbyterian (B-P or BP) churches in Singapore have continued to exist separately. The B-P movement grew out of the Bible Presbyterian Church in the United States. As of 2009, there were 20,000 members in 32 B–P churches in Singapore. The number of B-P churches in Singapore grew to forty-three in 2020/21 but stands at forty as of 2024

BPC was noted for a belief in literal six-day creation and a preference for the King James Version (KJV).

== History ==
The BPC was founded in 1955 by Timothy Tow. Tow had been influenced first by John Sung, and later by Carl McIntire. He was strongly opposed to liberal theology and ecumenism, and the de facto link of the English service he founded in 1950 in a Chinese Presbyterian church in the Chinese Presbyterian Synod that was connected to the World Council of Churches (WCC) in promoting modernist ecumenism in opposition to the International Council of Christian Churches (ICCC). A conflict ensued and the English Service pastored by Tow in Singapore Life Church (生命堂, Say Mia Tng in Teochew) at Prinsep Street severed connections with the Synod in 1955 to form Life Bible-Presbyterian Church (Life B–P Church, Life BP Church or Life BPC).

In 1988, after experiencing a period of significant dissension, the Synod of the BPC (BPCOS) voted to dissolve itself. It was "mainly due to strong differences in interpreting the Doctrine of Biblical Separation, Fundamentalism, and Neo-Evangelicalism"—as in the statement issued by the BPC on 30 October 1988 describing the dissolution.

== Divisions ==
=== Fundamentalist and Evangelical ===
While individual BP churches operate separately and independently post BP Synod dissolution, they fall essentially or broadly into two factions or groups. One group subscribes to the fundamentalist stance of the founders while the other considers itself to be evangelical. This latter group of churches is denounced by the former to be "neo-evangelical" or "liberal", and are often called "the new B-Ps" because of a different interpretation on the doctrine of "Biblical Separation".

The evangelical group of B-P churches embraces the fellowship of any church that professes evangelical Protestant Christianity and cooperates with para-church organizations like Campus Crusade, Youth for Christ, Navigators and the Bible Study Fellowship. Many ministers or aspiring ministers in the evangelical group prefer an evangelical seminary over the B-P's fundamentalist seminary, Far Eastern Bible College ("FEBC").

Shortly after the dissolution of the BPC Synod on 31 October 1988, Quek Swee Hwa ("SH Quek") and David Wong invited the general public to a "Presentation Evening" on 19 November 1988 at the Sanctuary of the Clementi Bible Centre that led to them starting in 1989 the Biblical School of Theology, which later changed its name to Biblical Graduate School of Theology ("BGST"). Although the founders are BP ministers, BGST is a trans-denominational college. Notwithstanding the statements on separation in its Theological Position, BGST is a non-separatist school. It works and co-operates with persons in churches linked with the World Council of Churches (WCC).

After Life BPC failed in its lawsuit to dislodge the FEBC directors from the Gilstead Road premises to take over the operations of the FEBC due to the church disagreeing with the college teaching the doctrine of verbal plenary preservation ("VPP"), Life BPC – taking the lead role – started Emmanuel Reformed Bible College ("ERBC") in January 2017 on the premises of Calvary (Jurong) BPC, an ERBC affiliate together with Maranatha BPC and Sharon BPC. Charles Seet heads the ERBC as director and principal.

Twenty-three years after the dissolution of the BPCOS, four BP churches – Emmanuel, Herald, Zion Serangoon and Zion Bishan – inaugurated on 8 October 2011 the Bible-Presbyterian Church in Singapore ("BPCIS") to form what they had considered to be the new BP Presbytery. However, the BPCIS was not legally constituted and registered as a society until 19 December 2018. Three more BP churches – Mount Carmel, Mount Hermon and Shalom – joined after 2011 to make seven charter members before BPCIS submitted its application in 2017 to register as a society. The BPCIS had only seven BP churches (out of a total of forty-three BP churches in Singapore) as charter members at its registration despite organising many meetings and activities prior to the registration's approval and gazetting by the government. However, Wong, the first General Secretary of the BPCIS, announced in August 2020 on Mount Horeb BPC (another in the Mount Carmel group of mountain-named BP churches) becoming the eighth member of the BPCIS. Wong announced in October 2021 on Grace BPC becoming the ninth BPCIS member. He announced in May 2022 on Hebron BPC joining on 10 March 2022 as the tenth member of BPCIS. Mount Gerizim BPC, another mountain church operating at #05-06 Woodlands 11, 11 Woodlands Close, Singapore 737853, is listed on the updated BPCIS website as of April 2023 as the eleventh member.

With only seven BP churches out of a total of 43 BP churches when BPCIS was registered with the Registrar of Societies ("ROS") in December 2018 – it is now eleven (see above) – Jeffrey Khoo remarked that BPCIS calling itself the new BP Presbytery is a misnomer. A new B-P presbytery called “The Presbytery of Singapore Bible-Presbyterian Churches” – comprising five non-BPCIS churches in Abundant Life, Calvary (Jurong), Life, New Life and Sharon B-P Churches – was registered with the ROS on 3 October 2022 with Peter Chua as Chairman and Charles Seet as Vice Chairman of the interim board .

==== Leadership of Fundamentalist Faction ====
The fundamentalist group was headed by Timothy Tow and his brother Tow Siang Hwa ("SH Tow").

Timothy Tow pastored Life BPC until 2003 when he left to found True Life BPC because his two assistant pastors, Charles Seet and Colin Wong, and (a majority of) the Session at Life BPC rejected a 100% perfect Bible without any mistake in the doctrine of the Verbal Plenary Preservation ("VPP") of Scripture. SH Tow headed the Calvary BP churches until his demise on 8 March 2019. However, Calvary BPC (Jurong), one of the churches, split with him (before his demise) when they issued on 6 November 2005 their statement "Explanation of Our Non-VPP Stand."

The fundamentalist group continues after the deaths of Timothy Tow and SH Tow with such new leaders as Jeffrey Khoo, Quek Suan Yew and Prabhudas Koshy – all directors and faculty members of the FEBC. All three new leaders uphold the VPP doctrine. They were among the defendants in the lawsuit between Life BPC and FEBC in which the church sued to evict the college from their Gilstead Road premises on account of the FEBC upholding the VPP doctrine. However, the church failed as the Court of Appeal, the apex court in Singapore's legal system, held that the VPP doctrine is not a deviation from the principles contained in the Westminster Confession of Faith ("WCF"), by which the work of the college has been informed and guided from its inception, and it is not inconsistent for a Christian who believes fully in the principles contained within the WCF and the VPI (Verbal Plenary Inspiration) doctrine to also subscribe to the VPP doctrine.

From 2014 and by 2016, following the lawsuit, the entire BP Fundamentalist faction was left with two basic sides: the first is led by Jeffrey Khoo and Quek Suan Yew and their relevant churches who hold to the VPP doctrine on the one side, while Rev Charles Seet and a group of like-minded non-VPP adherents comprise the latter side [who are still fundamentalists and continue to hold to their traditional fundmentalist principles (such as inerrancy, non-ecumenism, creationism doctrines, etc) which were already held prior to the VPP saga]. These churches include Life BPC as well as Calvary Jurong BP, Abundant Life, New Life BPC, Sharon BPC, and Marantha BPC amongst others, and this latter group is different from the non-fundamentalist evangelical BPCIS faction [and those under SH Quek (aformentioned above and with more detail below)], and this is why in 2022, this group also formally set up a new BP Presbytery for the like-minded (non-VPP) fundamentalist BP churches.

==== Leadership of Evangelical Faction ====
The evangelical/new evangelical group is led mainly by SH Quek and Wong; they headed the Zion-Carmel combination and played a significant role in the dissolution of the BP Synod or the BPCOS in 1988 because of their different views on Bible versions, tongues-speaking, and biblical separation. SH Quek is currently the Senior Pastor of Emmanuel BPC and Pastor Emeritus of Zion Bishan BPC. Wong is currently the Advisory Pastor of Zion Bishan BPC.

SH Quek and Wong were, respectively, the pastors of Zion BPC (now Zion Serangoon BPC) and Mount Carmel BPC in 1988 when the BP Synod or the BPCOS dissolved. The BP churches included in the Zion group (of the Zion-Carmel combination) were Zion BPC, Bethany BPC (which dropped the BP name and renamed itself as Bethany Independent Presbyterian Church on 10 July 1992), Emmanuel BPC and Cana BPC; and the churches in the Carmel group (before the BP Synod dissolution) were Mount Carmel BPC, Hebron BPC and Mount Hermon BPC.

Wong, SH Quek's protege, issued his response on the BP Synod dissolution in the "Carmel Weekly" of 6 November 1988 to the congregations he pastored and supervised in the Carmel group. Wong is also one of the four authors/editors in the 2018 publication, Heritage & Legacy of the Bible-Presbyterian Church in Singapore (hereinafter Heritage & Legacy); he wrote seven articles compared to six written by SH Quek in the book. Although Chua Choon Lan ("CL Chua") wrote more articles in Heritage & Legacy, he did so as General Editor in a lay capacity; this is evidenced by the less doctrinal nature of his articles (seven of which are on church buildings) and his profession as a surgeon. SH Quek and Wong underline their role as the main spiritual leaders of the evangelical/new evangelical faction with answering the questions posed by the Editors in the round-table discussion in Heritage & Legacy on the dissolution of the BP Synod.

Quek Kiok Chiang ("KC Quek"), a founding BPC elder who relinquished the pastorship of Zion Serangoon to his son SH Quek on 31 October 1970, was on different side with Timothy Tow and SH Tow after the dissolution of the BPC in 1988. He (KC Quek) had defended his son's association and co-operation with para-church organizations; he also challenged the late Patrick Tan's proposal to him (as the incumbent Moderator before the Synod dissolution) to have Timothy Tow made the Synod Moderator to lead the BP Church back to the original stand before Patrick's proposal was withdrawn. Despite KC Quek's seniority, his switch to focus on pastoring the Mandarin/Teochew-speaking Faith BPC (first Mandarin BP Church in Singapore) meant that the main leaders of the evangelical/new evangelical faction were (and are) SH Quek and Wong. They also played key roles in the formation of BPCIS with eight of the current eleven BPCIS member churches hailing from the Zion-Carmel group (i.e., Zion Bishan, Zion Serangoon, Emmanuel, Mount Carmel, Mount Hermon, Mount Horeb, Hebron and Mount Gerizim ) – see "Fundamentalist and Evangelical" above.

== Doctrine, Distinctives and Differences ==
=== Doctrinal Statement ===
A typical BP church registered in 1986 has an article (usually Article 4) in its constitution stating that the church's doctrine shall follow that system commonly known as "the Reformed Faith" as expressed in the Westminster Confession of Faith ("WCF"), the Larger and Shorter Catechisms. In addition to the Apostles' Creed, the chief tenets of the church's doctrine are set forth in 12 statements on: (i) the Scriptures; (ii) the Triune God; (iii) the virgin birth of Christ; (iv) the creation and fall of man; (v) the propitiatory and expiatory death of Christ; (vi) the bodily resurrection, ascension and exaltation of Christ; (vii) the personal, visible and pre-millennial return of Christ; (viii) salvation being by grace through faith; (ix) the ministry of the Holy Spirit; (x) the Sacraments of Baptism and Lord's Supper instituted by Christ; (xi) the eternal destiny of the saved and the lost; and (xii) the principle and practice of separation. (The numbers (i)-(xii) used below refer to the doctrinal matters in the corresponding numbers above.)

Churches in the Carmel group in the evangelical faction, however, do not follow the Doctrine template of a typical BP church. Most of them registered with the ROS after 1986 while Mount Carmel BPC registered earlier in 1982 with the Registry of Companies as Mount Carmel BP Church Ltd under the Companies Act (Cap. 50). As evident in their Statements of Faith/Beliefs posted on their websites, the Carmel group of churches omit certain statements in their Statements so that, unlike a typical BPC, they have a total of ten or eleven statements: Hebron BPC omits "premillennial" in statement (vii). Also the last statement (either the tenth or eleventh) of the Carmel group of churches omits the underlined words in statement (xii) (i.e., 4.2.12 of Life BPC's or Shalom BPC's constitution): "We believe in the real, spiritual unity in Christ of all redeemed by His precious blood and the necessity of faithfully maintaining the purity of the Church in doctrine and life according to the Word of God and the principle and practice of biblical separation from the apostasy of the day being spearheaded by the Ecumenical Movement (2 Cor 6:14–18, Rev 18:4)". The omitted words reflect the link at the outset of the Singapore BPC with the ICCC in the battle against ecumenism and the WCC (represented locally by Malayan Christian Council ("MCC")).

Certain BP churches in the fundamentalist faction registered with the ROS after 1986, such as True Life BPC (2004) and Blessed Hope BPC (2014), expanded statement (i) on the Scriptures into three sub-statements to cover the VPI (Autographs) and the VPP (Apographs) of Scriptures in the original languages, the infallibility and inerrancy of the Hebrew OT and the Greek NT underlying the KJV, and the upholding of the KJV as the English translated Word of God for church use (WCF I:VIII); these churches also introduced an additional statement on God creating the whole universe ex nihilo (out of nothing) by the Word of His mouth in six literal or natural days (WCF IV:I).

=== Premillennialism ===
Premillennialism has been an important distinctive of the BPC in both America and Singapore from the very beginning. Timothy Tow learnt this doctrine from Dora Yu, John Sung, Chia Yu Ming, Oliver Buswell, Allan MacRae and R. Laird Harris, the last three-named being Tow's professors at Faith Theological Seminary which was founded by conservative Presbyterians headed by Carl McIntire who himself held dearly to the doctrine of the Premillennial Return of Christ and had it incorporated into the WCF by the Bible Presbyterian Church of America, founded also by him and other conservative Presbyterian clergymen. Upon Tow's return to Singapore after graduating from Faith, he imparted this doctrine to the congregants he pastored from 1950 and to the students he taught at FEBC where he was its lecturer and principal from 1962 (until his demise).

Premillennialism holds that (a) there will be a long period (1,000 years) of universal peace and happiness upon earth and (b) the return of Christ will happen before this period, rather than after this period – which is postmillennialism – while amillennialism (meaning "no millennium") denies that there will be such a period, with the 1,000 years of Revelation 20 being not literal but symbolic of Christ's present reign from heaven through the Church. The doctrine of premillennialism is so clearly taught in the Bible that it is difficult for anyone, absent resorting to "spiritualizing" hermeneutic, to explain away the facts in (a) and (b) above without calling also into question the explainer's interpretation of other Biblical doctrines.

==== Reformed Theology and BPC's Dispensational Premillennialism ====
Of the two types of premillennialism, historic and dispensational, the Singapore BPC adopts the latter – which is the position of McIntire, MacRae and Buswell who are all Reformed and covenantal in their system of theology.

Reformed theology uses the literal (i.e., grammatical-historical-canonical) method of interpretation and sees Israel as Israel without replacing it with the Church. In historic premillennialism, the rapture – an event described in 1 Thessalonians 4:15-17 as Christ's coming in the air for His people (the first phase of His second coming) – and the return of Christ to earth to reign as king (the second phase of His second coming) occur at the same time, with the rapture happening at the end of the tribulation (posttribulation rapture) so that Christians must go through the 7-year tribulation to endure suffering and persecution for the cause of Christ; in dispensational premillennialism, the two events are separated by either 7 years (pre-tribulation rapture) or 3½ years (mid-tribulation rapture). Historic premillennialists, like amillennialists and postmillennialists, believe that Israel has been replaced by the Church, and that prophecies relating to Israel must be interpreted as relating to the Church; dispensational premillennialists, also known as pro-Israel premillennialists, on the other hand adopts a literal approach to interpretation and emphasize the importance of the nation of Israel in the study of the end times and in God restoring His chosen nation to greatness when Messiah returns.

==== Romans 11 key to understanding Israel and the Church ====
Timothy Tow, writing on Romans 11 as being the key to answering the question on whether the blessings promised to Israel are fulfilled in the Church or in Israel herself, says that Israel will be restored when Christ returns to earth to establish His peaceful reign of a thousand years sitting on the throne of His father David – a position in accord with that of John Walvoord in interpreting Romans 11. Allan MacRae, in Biblical Christianity published with SH Quek helping him select his letters to be included in the book, says Scripture teaches that the Jews will return in unbelief to the land God covenanted to them through Abraham, and that the nation Israel living in the land in the day of Christ's coming will be converted (Zechariah 12:10; Ezekiel 20:33-40; 3:21-25) as God has declared that Abraham's seed will not cease from being a nation before Him forever (Jeremiah 31:35-37) and, while He is not going to leave Israel unpunished (Jeremiah 30:7-11), His purposes in grace will be fulfilled when His purposes in judgment are accomplished (Jeremiah 23:5-8; Hosea 2:14-16; Romans 11:26, 27).

==== BPC's Covenant Theology as opposed to Dipensationalism ====
Though dispensational premillennial in their eschatology, the BPC and its ministers are covenantal – and not dispensational – in their theology (soteriology) as not all dispensational premillennialists are dispensationalists even though every dispensationalist is dispensational premillennial in his eschatology.

While dispensationalism sees God's redemptive plan and history in a number of different tests and consequent failures in a system of discontinuity (C. I. Scofield lists seven dispensations), there is continuity in covenant theology which sees all of God's dealings with man under one of two covenants: (a) the Covenant of Works in which man was under, before the fall, wherein God promised him (through Adam, the federal head of the race) eternal blessedness if he perfectly kept the law; and (b) the Covenant of Grace (Romans 5:12-21) wherein God, of His free grace, promises the same blessings to all, since the fall, who believe in Christ (the federal head of the church).

The continuity in covenant theology sees a unifying theme of one Saviour and one way of salvation in the Covenant of Grace as OT believers had looked forward in faith to the (first) coming of Christ the Messiah-Saviour to atone for their sins by His sacrifice on the cross of Calvary, while NT believers looked or look back in faith to Him since He had already come and made the atoning sacrifice: the church is manifested in the nation of Israel in the OT (as Israel is not merely a political/national entity) and continues in the NT 'as organised from the day of Pentecost onward'.

Only a remnant of the Jews, including the Apostle Paul, are in the NT church (Romans 11:1-5) since Israel as a whole, except for the remnant, is blinded and cut off from the Abrahamic promises of grace (after their rejection of Christ), but they will be grafted in again into the Abrahamic tree after "the fullness of the Gentiles" has come in (Romans 11:25) even as Gentile Christians have their position in grace grafted into the Abrahamic tree. The NT church will be raptured prior to the salvation of Israel which will as a whole turn to the Lord after the rapture, as Paul predicts in Romans 11:26. (See also Timothy Tow in The Story of My Bible-Presbyterian Faith and Allan MacRae in Biblical Christianity above).

==== Premillennialism and Bible-Presbyterianism ====
The White Paper of the BPCIS says Premillennialism is non-essential to Bible-Presbyterianism even though BPCIS will only teach this view in their churches (p. 512 Heritage & Legacy). The doctrinal statements of certain BPCIS churches (see "Doctrinal Statement" above) allow their ministers and members to embrace Amillennialism or Postmilliennialism. In a revamp of its website recently, Zion Serangoon BPC changed its statement on the second coming of Christ to: "We believe in the personal, visible, glorious, and bodily return of our Lord Jesus Christ …". Zion Bishan BPC, which operated with the same constitution and statement of faith as the Serangoon parent or head office until Bishan's registration as its own entity with the ROS in 2010, still has: "We believe in the personal, visible and premillennial return of our Lord and Saviour Jesus Christ …" (underlining added to show the word removed by Zion Serangoon BPC).

Contrary to BPCIS's assertion, Joshua Yong clarifies that the BPC does not separate from other Christians or churches just because they hold to a different millennial view; Peter Masters of Metropolitan Tabernacle, who is amillennial, was invited to speak to the BPC. The BPC only requires its members to adhere to its constitution which, inter alia, has a doctrinal statement declaring premillennialism as an essential doctrine or a chief tenet among a list of key beliefs or doctrines that they must subscribe to when they are admitted as members, and they are free to leave and join another church if they should (later) disagree.

=== Biblical Separation ===
Bobby Sng, non-BP church historian, in his book In His Good Time: The Story of the Church in Singapore 1819–2002 (3rd Ed, Singapore Bible Society, p. 232) described the BPC, after its separation from the MCC, as a church which developed at a rapid pace 'in isolation from other churches' and its strong call to all Protestant Christians to separate themselves from churches with liberal leadership appealed to some but antagonized the leaders of the larger churches.

The editors of Heritage & Legacy of the Bible-Presbyterian Church in Singapore, representing BPCIS, attempt to rewrite the history of the BP Church. On the doctrine, principle and practice of Biblical separation, they attempt to do so in several ways.

CL Chua in Heritage & Legacy questioned whether there was actually a split or a break away from the mother church Say Mia Tng since Life BPC continued to use the premises of Say Mia Tng for nearly eight years before moving out on 21 October 1962 to Life BPC's present premises at Gilstead Road. Chua also pointed to Timothy Tow not accusing the Chinese Presbyterian churches of being liberal or ecumenical, and Life BPC and Say Mia Tng maintaining a friendly relationship during their co-existence on the same premises. He wondered if, instead of a break, Life BPC was just going 'independent' with the blessings of its mother church.

Ko Ling-Kang pointed to Heritage & Legacy obtaining the testimonies of some pioneer members of the BP Church in Chapter Four – Voice of the Silent Generation to attempt to make their point that there was no split or separation. With seemingly leading questions posed to elicit the desired answers, Ko remarked that Elder Joshua Lim Heong Wee responded that there was no break from Say Mia Tng and there was also no issue with its pastors and elders over their theological beliefs. However, Ko remarked that the testimony of Elder Dr Ang Beng Chong is more factual and truthful. After noting that theological liberalism was spreading worldwide and had also reached Singapore, Ang went on to say that Say Mia Tng's English Service, under the leadership of Timothy Tow, separated from the MCC to align itself with the ICCC and 'Bible-Presbyterian (BP)' was added to the church's name to distinguish it from the mainline Presbyterian Synod of Singapore.

Ang's account agrees with that of Timothy Tow who, in The Singapore B–P Church Story, wrote that the BP Church founded by him was to uphold the torch of the separatist stand and of the 20th Century Reformation Movement. Tow also wrote in January 1955, after the last battle for the Faith was unsuccessfully fought in Muar at the Trinity Presbyterian Church against the 'usual phalanx of modernist missionaries and subservient national pastors', that the Interim Committee decided to fully constitute Say Mia Tng (English service) as a church and to sever connections with the Synod on account of modernism.

Quek Kiok Chiang, BPC founding elder, concurred when he wrote that the second fold of the threefold cord of the BP Church Movement was the determination from the beginning "to separate from all entanglements" by taking the Scriptural position of separation (2 Cor. 6:14–18) in joining the ICCC to 'contend earnestly for the faith once delivered unto the saints' (Jude 3) and cutting link, even indirectly, with the apostate Ecumenical Movement.

Ko Ling-Kang remarked that if it was just the planting of a daughter church which went independent with the mother church's blessing, there would not be a need for Life BPC to sever ties with the Synod. While Life BPC continued to operate on the premises of Say Mia Tng after the break and maintained a friendly relationship with mother church, there was no longer any formal ecclesiastical relationship. If mother church was in agreement with Life BP Church, mother church would not stay on in the ecumenical Synod but heed Life BPC's call to all Protestant Christians, as noted by church historian Bobby Sng (see above), to separate themselves from churches that had liberal leadership.

That there was indeed a separation at the onset of the BPC is clear as Dev Menon, Pastor of Zion Bishan BP Church, acknowledges at p. 150 Heritage & Legacy that 'the BP Church will be remembered as a church born and bred on its stand of separation'. The editors of Heritage & Legacy seem to want to sow doubt about the separation because acknowledging it means that the BPC at its inception practised separation not only from liberalism, but also separation from believers who had compromised with ecumenical groups – what the BPCIS term secondary separation.

==== Issue of secondary separation ====
If there was a separation of the BPC at the onset, as indeed there was (see above), Daniel Chua – who succeeded Wong as Senior Pastor of Mount Carmel BPC in December 1993 before becoming its Pastor-at-Large in January 2016, postulates that the initial separation stand of the BP Church was moderate with only 'primary' or first-degree separation – allegedly the stance adopted by McIntire in the earlier years of the BPC of America which was then passed to the Singapore BPC – but this was changed or modified over time by McIntire and by a 'strong-headed but influential minority' in the Singapore BPC to incorporate 'secondary' or second-degree separation. If Daniel Chua fails to prove that the separation stand was not a moderate one at the BPC inception, he then asserts that it should have been one – like what the BPCIS are doing which, they claim, Machen would approve it if he were alive today and which is also the teaching of the Bible, based on Daniel's exegesis of certain Bible verses.

That the BPC of America adopted at the beginning a strong or militant stance on separation – "one that calls for separation not just from unbelief and apostasy, but also from compromise and disobedient brethren" – is clear. Ko Ling-Kang points to McGoldrick, et al. (2012) describing as 'rigorous' the posture of the BPC on personal and ecclesiastical separation, and BP minister Francis A Schaeffer in a paper to the BP Synod in 1942 presented the BPC as 'militantly' stating its system of doctrine as separatists.

The Articles of Association drawn up at the inaugural meeting of the BPC of America in June 1937 shows the founding fathers (including McIntire) had intended to associate as militant fundamentalists in their fight against "modernism, compromise, indifferentism, and worldliness", and this militant separation stand was then passed as a heritage to the Singapore BPC as Timothy Tow studied at Faith Seminary in the 1940s (January 1948 to May 1950) when, one wintry morning in mid-January 1948, his heart was 'strangely warmed' by McIntire's message at the seminary's Chapel Hour challenging young men to join a Twentieth Century Reformation which Tow later did upon his return to Singapore in joining the Separatist Cause of the ICCC. Tow affirmed the BPC's militant stand when he quoted McIntire's declaration, "The Bible Presbyterian Church is a militant church in the defense of the faith", in his book The Singapore B–P Church Story for the Singapore BPC that he founded.

Ko Ling-Kang, in his article in The Burning Bush (January 2021), points to the BPCIS citing McIntire's words for use against him in their claim that he initially urged caution against 'extreme separation' and 'took a very moderate approach in the earlier years' on separation before hardening his stance in the 1950s. The words are probably those printed on p. 507 of Daniel Chua's article in Heritage & Legacy on McIntire's address to the ministers and elders of the BPC on 7 September 1944 calling them not to separate from the 'many godly people still in apostate denominations' further than what is required in God's Word. But Chua omits those words which clarify the context of McIntire's call being one that was made to the BPC ministers and elders to stay (separated) while trying to reach godly Christians in the apostate denominations to urge them to come out of their denominations and join the reformation – rather than to call the BPC elders and ministers to embark on an offensive to infiltrate the apostate denominations.

In the fundamentalists-versus-liberals battle for Princeton Seminary, Machen showed that he would not tolerate the inconsistences of a moderate position by ranking three possible attitudes that one could adopt in the conflict: (a) standing for Christ, which is the best; (b) standing for anti-Christian Modernism, which is the next best; and (c) being neutral, which is the worst. McIntire follows Machen's separatist principle in that either unbelievers must be pushed out or Bible-believers must withdraw; else the church stops being the church. Ko Ling-Kang, accordingly, points to Machen and McIntire withdrawing from the Presbyterian Church in the U.S.A (PCUSA) and Princeton Seminary to found the Presbyterian Church of America (renamed Orthodox Presbyterian Church) and Westminster Seminary, not because these two institutions were full of apostasy and liberal teachings but because the moderates in their leadership and the General Assembly of the PCUSA did not take firm action against the liberals but sought to mediate a neutral position to accommodate all views.

The Singapore BPC from its inception practised separation from Christians and churches which refused to separate from apostasy. While Daniel Chua refuses to acknowledge this, he is again contradicted by Dev Menon who writes that in the earlier years of the 1950s 'only the BP Church insisted on having secondary separation' (p. 146 Heritage & Legacy).

Jeffrey Khoo and Charles Seet see no degrees in separation, as separation is simply separation and has the holiness of God – which has no degrees – as its premise. They share the same view as McIntire who sees separation as a command that requires only obedience and it should not be fractured into degrees (for options to obey or to ignore), as to do so is also disobedience and sin. But BPCIS sees separation in different degrees and asserts that the right biblical approach is only primary (first-degree) not secondary (second-degree) separation.

=== Fundamentalism v New Evangelicalism ===
In the early 1940s, after the dust of the fundamentalist-modernist controversies had settled, there arose a new generation of evangelicals and so-called fundamentalists who were repelled by the militant stance of their evangelical/fundamentalist forefathers in separating from those who denied many fundamental truths of the Bible such as its inspiration, inerrancy and infallibility, the deity and virgin birth of Christ, etc. In England, the term "fundamentalist" is less preferred to "evangelical", and it is also no exaggeration that many who call themselves evangelicals today are New Evangelicals as the two terms have become synonymous.

The term "Neo Evangelicalism" was coined by Harold Ockenga in 1948 emphasizing the repudiation of separatism and a determination to engage in theological dialogue in a new emphasis to apply the gospel to sociological, political and economic issues. Ockenga was pastor of the Park Street Church in Boston, founder of the National Association of Evangelicals, co-founder and first president of Fuller Theological Seminary, first president of the World Evangelical Fellowship (now World Evangelical Alliance), one-time editor of Christianity Today and a member of the board of directors for the Billy Graham Evangelistic Association.

The Singapore BPC from its inception was linked to the ICCC – a worldwide fellowship of fundamental churches opposed to liberalism, ecumenism, neo-evangelicalism and charismatism. Founding BPC elder KC Quek, prior to his switch to support his son KC Quek (see "Leadership of evangelical faction" above), affirmed in 1985 on the BPC, in concert with the ICCC, contending in Singapore against New Evangelicals Billy Graham (1978) and Luis Palau (1-7 June 1986).

==== Opposition to Billy Graham ====
McIntire in the U.S. and Timothy Tow in Singapore opposed Billy Graham and his co-operative evangelism as they saw the danger in Graham's compromise. McIntire said that Graham had become "a cover for the apostates". At Graham's 1957 New York crusade, he eulogized Dr. Jesse Baird, a well-known liberal and apostate, by calling him 'a great servant of Christ'; at his 1957 San Francisco Crusade, he praised Episcopal Bishop James Pike who denied the deity, virgin birth, miracles, and bodily resurrection of Jesus Christ; and at his 1963 Los Angeles Crusade, he commended Methodist Bishop Gerald Kennedy, the crusade's chairman who denied practically every fundamental doctrine of the Christian faith, as "one of the ten greatest Christian preachers in America". Other modernists or liberals lauded by Graham include Rudolph Bultmann, Karl Barth, Emil Brunner, Reinhold Niebuhr, Paul Tillich, Robert J. McCracken and Norman Vincent Peale.

The spirit of tolerance in neo-evangelicalism caused Graham to end up in universalism and liberalism as he believed that people can be saved without knowing Christ and he also expressed uncertainty about a literal fire in hell as a place of eternal torment. Despite deviating from the Christian faith, Graham maintained that he fully adhered to the fundamental tenets of the faith for himself and his ministry.

Timothy Tow's opposition to Billy Graham came into focus when he serialised J.A. Johnson's book Billy Graham – the Jehoshaphat of our Generation and published two news reports in his capacity as special correspondent for an Australian Christian newspaper New Life in the Far Eastern Beacon, November and December 1968 on the Graham-sponsored Asia-South Pacific Congress of Evangelism held in Singapore from November 5–13, 1968 (the "Congress"). Tow said he had the support of Life BPC, except for one or two in the Session which later increased to a few, and also the BP Presbytery.

Daniel Chua paints a different picture (p. 518, Heritage & Legacy), based probably on pioneer member Joshua Lim's earlier account in Heritage & Legacy (pp. 185–186) that the Session was unhappy with Tow's work. But Tow differed from Lim in that while having to write fairly and accurately the two reports for New Life, Tow also put in a conclusion – unpalatable to some – in the second report by remarking that the line of separation from Ecumenical apostasy maintained by the 20th Century Reformation Movement in Singapore and Malaysia in the spirit of John Sung during the previous two decades had been all but obliterated by the Congress and warning that while thousands might be "signed up" into the Ecumenical fold, thousands might also be "signed off".

==== New Evangelicalism in Singapore BPC ====
Among the detractors who opposed Timothy Tow on the Billy Graham issue in the late 1960s (above), Jeffrey Khoo says that some had repented. One of them was SH Tow who was on the same side as Joshua Lim (p. 186 Heritage & Legacy) but changed when he realised he had erred (p. 430 Heritage & Legacy). SH Tow spoke out against the 1978 Billy Graham Crusade ("BGC") in Singapore.

Joshua Lim, however, remained intransigent as he participated in the 1978 BGC by being a member of its Advisory Committee, albeit in a personal capacity and not as a BPC elder (p. 186 Heritage & Legacy). Joshua Lim's and Daniel Chua's remarks on the lack of support for Timothy Tow's opposition to the Billy Graham-sponsored Congress in 1968 (see above) lack credibility, since the BPC – to the seeming lament of Wong – did not participate in the 1978 BGC which attracted participation from 237 out of 265 Protestant congregations in Singapore (p. 419 Heritage & Legacy). The claim of CL Chua (pp. 98–99 Heritage & Legacy) that ministers and Session members were regarded as 'dissenters' for disagreeing with Timothy Tow in the first decade of the BPC despite representing the majority view lacks documentary proof.

Jeffrey Khoo finds it disconcerting that the editors and the contributing writers of Heritage & Legacy call themselves "BP" and talk about the BP "heritage and legacy" but yet write approvingly of Graham while maligning Timothy Tow, the Singapore BPC founding father, who took a separatist stand against Graham. This is contrary to the claim on their website that their book was published inter alia to honour BP "pioneers".

The current President of the ICCC, Brad K Gsell, is also opposed to Billy Graham as he wrote The Legacy of Billy Graham: The accommodation of truth to error in the evangelical church (1998, Revised and Expanded Edition, published by Fundamental Presbyterian Publications). SH Quek, previously General Secretary and Second Vice-President (until June 2023) of the ICCC but still a member of its Executive Committee, seems to be tone-deaf or indifferent to Gsell and the ICCC's stance even though he [Quek] mentions serving many years in the ICCC and its agencies (pp. 80–81 Heritage & Legacy).

SH Quek's view on separation is not the same as that of his father KC Quek who, in the early years of the BPC, was regarded by Timothy Tow as "McIntire's ardent disciple" equal to Tow in zeal for the defence of the faith. KC Quek's separatist stand (after switching side to join SH Quek) seemed to have dimmed or changed as Dev Menon at p. 149 Heritage & Legacy mentions KC Quek's message at the Golden Jubilee of the SCCC in 2006, printed in the Far Eastern Beacon in 2010 as "My Thanksgiving Testimonies", recommending member SCCC churches going forward to continue to separate from the Ecumenical movement (were they not already separated?) but the subsequent words (in Menon's article) are unclear as to whether KC Quek was calling member SCCC churches to remain within the Ecumenical movement (and not separate?) to witness to (non-SCCC) churches or to remain indifferent.

The editors of Heritage & Legacy chose to include only KC Quek's reports on welfare services in Singapore (pp. 363–364) and Christian relief work to Kampuchea (pp. 377–378) in the book rather than his epochal message on the three-fold cord in 1971 (repeated in 1985) which characterises the BPC from its inception. It is symptomatic of New Evangelicals to change focus to social work such as the provision of assistance in natural disasters.

Khoo feels that those who oppose the doctrine and practice of separation of the founding father should do the honourable thing by leaving the BPC to form their own denomination and not remain to give lip-service to separation when they are practically neo-evangelicals. SH Quek, who was ordained on 31 October 1970 to succeed his father as pastor of Zion BPC shortly after his return to Singapore on 7 October 1970 after studying a decade abroad (to obtain his BD from Faith Seminary and his PhD from the University of Manchester), has his article The Christian and Music and two reports on Zion BPC and Zion Kindergarten in The Bible-Presbyterian Church of Singapore and Malaysia 1950–1971 where, on p. 61, is printed the words in Ecumenism or New Revolution? of Thomas Molnar who detests the arrogance and cowardice of those who do not believe in or agree with the organization to which they belong, but remain to bore from within in order to change the institution into something different from what it is and has been, when they should be acting like honourable men to leave the organization for another which they approve or found a new organization and gain disciples by the importance and clarity of their own faith.

Timothy Tow in The Singapore B-P Church Story lauded a former B-P church stating herself as "Independent" as being "bold enough" to drop her B-P name. That former B-P church, a daughter of Zion B-P Church, is now Bethany Independent-Presbyterian Church.(see "Leadership of Evangelical Faction" above).

Even J. Gresham Machen, whom they [the BPCIS] claim to look up to (see "Issue of secondary separation" above), detests the strategy New Evangelicals employ to infiltrate and change organisations from within; he gives an illustration that those who advocate Republican principles should not think of making a declaration of conformity to Democratic principles to gain entry into a Democratic club to finally turn its resources into an anti-Democratic propaganda, and a church should be more honest than a political club.

Daniel Chua denies that the "moderates" – by which they call themselves – are neo-evangelicals, but Jeffrey Khoo disagrees as after the dissolution of the Synod in 1988 they have departed further from the original BP position by advancing their non-separatist stand in cooperating with those who have compromised the faith, by being open to charismatic tongues, by replacing the KJV with modern corrupt Bible versions and by introducing Contemporary Christian Music ("CCM" ) into their worship services. Khoo also points to Bob Phee, now with BPCIS, who wrote and distributed in October 1988 a paper entitled "Neo-Evangelicalism in the Bible-Presbyterian Church" detailing the neo-evangelicalism of SH Quek.

Harold Ockenga, the father of New Evangelicalism, in his foreword to Harold Lindsell's Battle for the Bible wrote that Neo-evangelicalism is different from Fundamentalism in the former's repudiation of separatism, and New Evangelicalism adherents emphasized, inter alia, the recapture of denominational leadership and the reexamination of theological problems such as the antiquity of man, the universality of the flood and God's method of creation.

Jeffrey Khoo notes with no surprise that (a) SH Quek, Wong, Daniel Chua et al. would want to recapture the BP denominational leadership in the formation of a new presbytery in the BPCIS (see "Leadership of Evangelical Faction" above); (b) SH Quek being open to the Genesis "years" being "months" and not literally "years" while questioning the universality of the Genesis Flood, God's method of creation, etc.; and (c) Wong obtained his DMin degree from Fuller Seminary, flagship seminary of neo-evangelicalism, and had worked with Haggai Institute which co-operates with liberals, Catholics, and charismatics.

Khoo also points to neo-evangelicals speaking of separation and saying they are for it when they are actually not, invariably contradicting the Bible and themselves – an observation made also by David Cloud that not every New Evangelical is as frank as Ockenga in his repudiation of separatism as some merely give lip service to separation because they neither like nor practise it. In a revamp of its website recently, Zion Serangoon BPC revised its statement of beliefs by reducing from 12 to 9 the statements which form the chief tenets of faith/beliefs of a typical BPC (see "Doctrinal Statement" above); the last or twelfth statement on biblical separation has now been dropped. Zion Bishan BPC, which operated with the same constitution and statement of beliefs as the Serangoon parent or head office until Bishan's registration as its own entity with the ROS in 2010, still has all 12 statements in its statement of faith including the twelfth or last statement on biblical separation: "We believe in … faithfully maintaining the purity of the Church in doctrine and life according to the Word of God and the principle and practice of biblical separation from the apostasy of the day being spearheaded by the Ecumenical Movement (or other such movements) (2 Cor 6:14-18; Rev 18:4)".

=== KJV and Modern English Bibles ===
Another feature which once distinguished the BPC from other churches is its preference for the KJV of the English Bible and there was a period of time in which the BPC in Singapore used only the KJV in public reading, preaching and teaching. Elder Chia Hong Chek, a pioneer member of the BPC, says that Timothy Tow wanted the English service he founded and pastored at Say Mia Tng – which became Life BPC – to be a distinct Bible-believing church and also to stick to the KJV, and not the RSV (p. 172, Heritage & Legacy).

Timothy Tow was persuaded at one time to use the New International Version ("NIV") as Laird Harris and Allan MacRae, his teachers at Faith Seminary, were among the NIV translators (p. 178, Heritage & Legacy). However, the use of the NIV was brief as Tow's unswerving support for the KJV did not abate since Life BPC continued to use it for public reading even though Tan Wai Choon, its assistant pastor 1978–1981, encouraged the NIV's use, albeit only for private reading with the NASB; the BP Synod finally issued a statement on 26 October 1981 affirming reliance on the KJV and recommending that the two newer versions may be used for collateral reading and reference, in particular by serious students of the Bible, but the AV or the KJV should not be displaced or replaced (pp. 178–179, Heritage & Legacy).

Timothy Tow did not follow Harris and MacRae all the way on the NIV as he wrote in 1998 the lyrics for The King James Bible vs Hundred Versions and penned in the Life BPC's weekly of 26 July 1998 (while he was pastor of the church) his call to those using the NIV, the RSV and other modern Bible versions "to cease taking their poison and be delivered from the death in their pot". He also wrote the foreword to SH Tow's book Beyond Versions – A Biblical Perspective of Modern English Bibles (1998) which upholds the KJV against modern English Bibles.

Timothy Tow's position on Bible versions accords with that of Carl McIntire who, when the RSV was copyrighted and promoted by the National Council of the Churches of Christ in the USA ("NCC") in 1952, launched immediately a blitz against the RSV which included him publishing and printing in hundreds of thousands a pamphlet The New Bible, Revised Standard Version: Why Christians Should Not Accept It to denounce as heretical the RSV's rendering of certain Bible verses such as replacing "everlasting" (KJV) in Micah 5:2 with "ancient days" (RSV) and replacing "virgin" (KJV) in Isaiah 7:14 with "young woman" (RSV); these changes removed Christ's eternal pre-existence and deity.

Timothy Tow praised McIntire's swift offensive against the RSV and although McIntire did not act as speedily when the NIV first appeared in 1978 due to fifth columnists within the ICCC ranks, Tow nonetheless commended him for reaching "the crowning of his life-long struggle against Satan's wiles to falsify God's Word" when the ICCC, at its birthplace in Amsterdam, in 1998 passed a resolution urging "all Bible-believing churches worldwide to use only the Authorized KING JAMES VERSION in their services and in their teaching ministry" amidst more than 150 so-called 'versions' of the Bible extant around the world.

McIntire's legacy on the KJV continues in the Bible Presbyterian Church in Collingswood, NJ – the church that he founded and pastored – where they still "believe the King James Version is the most faithful and accurate translation available in the English language" and they use it exclusively in public worship and in the teaching and training of their children and youth.

Although SH Quek has been associated with the ICCC for many years (pp. 80–81 Heritage & Legacy – see also New Evangelicalism in Singapore BPC above), the BPCIS sees Bible versions as a non-essential and their churches are free to use the versions of their choice according to guidelines of the Presbytery (p. 512, Heritage & Legacy). While the use of the KJV is not precluded, NIV and ESV are promoted and usually used.

When Ho Peng Kee was installed as an elder of Mount Carmel BPC on 17 April 1987, he was presented with an NIV (1984) bible by Wong and Ang Beng Chong with the latter hand-writing on the inner cover of the presented NIV Bible the charge to Ho in the KJV in full in 1 Peter 5:2–4 beneath which Wong and Ang signed off their names. Zion Serangoon BPC has officially added the ESV as a Second Official Translation to the KJV for public reading in the church besides recommending the New King James Version ("NKJV") (1982), the NASB (1995), the NIV (1984) and The Holman Christian Standard Bible (2005) ("HCSB") to its members for collateral reading and study – based on a paper headed BP Distinctives on Bible Versions issued by the church's Session and Board of Deacons on 7 July 2015. (See also first paragraph in this section above on the BPC being distinguished at its onset for exclusive use of the KJV.)

Although the NKJV is translated from the Majority Text (see "NIV, KJV and their texts" below for "Majority Text" use in different situations), Life BPC in its Golden Jubilee Magazine 1950–2000 in A Doctrinal Positional Statement of Life B-P Church (a) flashed out the NKJV changing the KJV text in about 60,000 places, including perfectly good terms in the KJV that should have remained unchanged; (b) considered the NIV 'unreliable' and (c) called it the "New Evangelical Version" (NEV) because of the deep involvement of the National Association of Evangelicals in the NIV's production and promotion. This view has not changed, based on Life BPC's website currently displaying what was published in 2000.

The Textus Receptus (TR) and the Majority Text have frequently been used synonymously and while this is largely correct because the Received Text or the TR does represent the majority of textual witnesses in most readings, the TR also contains readings not supported by the majority of extant Greek manuscripts. The NKJV, which claims its NT to be translated from the Textus Receptus and which has as its principal Editor Arthur L Farstad who endorses the so-called Majority Text of the Greek New Testament he produced with Zane C Hodges, has been found to have in its marginal references variant reading (from the defective Alexandrian manuscripts) to cast doubt on such fundamental doctrines as the Eternal Generation of the Son, the Union of Christ's Deity and Humanity, the Incarnation and the Blood Atonement, and the Eternal Punishment of the Dead in Hell; it (the NKJV) apparently also has in its actual text Critical Text readings (which deviate from the Received Text) and other unwarranted changes; it also has non-Masoretic readings as variant in its margin for the Old Testament whose executive director, James Price, admitted that he is not a TR advocate and believes that God has preserved the autographic text in the whole body of evidence including in the modern Critical Texts like NA26/27 [Nestles] and UBS [United Bible Societies]. The Critical Text readings in the NKJV have also been acknowledged by Critical Text advocate Mark Ward who had denied there were any such readings but then retracted the acknowledgement by saying that he is still right that there were no Critical Text readings.

The ESV (first published in 2001) and the NIV are critiqued by Timothy Tow and Jeffrey Khoo in their book Theology For Every Christian (2007) and listed together with the NIV, NASB, NKJV and the RSV – all (except NJKV) translated from the Alexandrian/Minority/Wescott-Hort Text and the Nestle-Aland Greek NT – as among the many Bibles of ecumenism, modernism, neo-evangelicalism and neo-fundamentalism. Although the HCSB is not specifically listed, its NT is translated primarily from the United Bible Societies Greek New Testament and Nestle-Aland's Novum Testamentum Graece and Dr Ken Matto has compared 50 verses translated in the HCSB with the same 50 verses translated in the KJV and two other Bibles in the New American Bible ("NAB") of the Roman Catholic Institution and the New World Translation ("NWT") of the Jehovah's Witnesses to see the differences before concluding that (a) the HCSB is as corrupt as the NWT or (b) the NWT is as accurate as the HCSB.

The ESV is adapted from the RSV, the copyright of which is owned by the NCC whose permission was obtained for use of the 1971 revision of the RSV as the basis for the ESV translation work which has resulted in the ESV being 91% the same word-for-word as the RSV – the percentage is even higher when gender-related language changes and the uses of "Thee", "Thou" and "Thine" referring to Deity are ignored. The NCC is a liberal organization that is not a "friend of Evangelical Reformed Theology" and the ESV "generally sticks too closely to the original RSV translation, and therefore the text is still tainted by liberal theology".

The Zion Serangoon BPC's paper of 7 July 2015 (see above) promotes the ESV as having certain advantages over the KJV and lists among the references made in the study by the Session and the Board of Deacons for the issuance of the paper Dr Joel Grassi's A Critical Analysis of the English Standard Version of 2001. Grassi, however, concludes his analysis of the ESV on p. 41 with five conclusions adverse to its use and a prayer at the end: "May the LORD's churches see the ESV for what it really is: a subtle attack upon the words of God by an enemy who knows what he is doing".

=== VPP ===
Those who embrace the VPP doctrine believe that God has preserved, down to the last detail, all of Scripture without any loss of the original words, prophecies, promises, commandments, doctrines, and truths.

The FEBC expands on the above with its explanation that "verbal" means "every word to the jot and tittle" (Ps 12:6–7, Matt 5:18) and "plenary" means "the Scripture as a whole with all the words intact" (Matt 24:35, 1 Pet 1:25) so that VPP means the whole of Scripture with all its words even to the jot and tittle is perfectly preserved by God without any loss of the original words, prophecies, promises, commandments, doctrines, and truths, not only in the words of salvation, but also the words of history, geography and science: every book, every chapter, every verse, every word, every syllable, every letter is infallibly preserved by the Lord Himself to the last iota.

==== Timothy Tow on VPP ====
VPP was not in issue when the KJV was the Bible in the English language used exclusively by the Singapore BPC for public reading, preaching and teaching (see KJV and Modern English Bibles above). However, as the modern versions of the English Bible introduced since the 80's in some BP churches have their New Testament translated from different underlying Greek texts, i.e., the Critical Texts of Westcott and Hort compared with the Received Text/Traditional Text/Textus Receptus for the KJV, a study or research into the original language texts in Hebrew, Aramaic and Greek underlying the various versions of the English Bible became necessary since Timothy Tow had been schooled to accept everything taught by Westcott and Hort on the Greek New Testament when he was a student in Faith Seminary in 1948, just as D A Waite was also taught the same thing in Dallas Seminary at the same time. After studying into the research of Westcott and Hort by Edward F Hills, a classmate of Carl McIntire at Westminster Seminary, Timothy Tow was convinced that the teachings of Westcott and Hort were "poison to our souls".

D A Waite visited FEBC in 1992 (p. 175, Heritage & Legacy). He spoke at Calvary Pandan BPC, as well as FEBC, on the textual issue and defended the KJV and its underlying texts. After he had spoken in a "Bible for Today" seminar held at Calvary Pandan BPC and proven from Scripture that God has preserved His Word to the last word, Timothy Tow told Waite, "We are of the same wavelength." Waite, who is the author of Defending the King James Bible (first published 1992), says "that the WORDS of the Received Greek and Masoretic Hebrew texts that underlie the KING JAMES BIBLE are the very WORDS which God has PRESERVED down through the centuries, being the exact WORDS of the ORIGINALS themselves". After Waite's visit, FEBC rejected Bruce Metzger's book on textual criticism The Text of the New Testament which was required reading for the college's Greek courses and changed to the use of only the Traditional Hebrew Masoretic Text and the Greek Textus Receptus published by the Trinitarian Bible Society ("TBS") in its biblical language and literature classes while the KJV continues to be the only acceptable version for use in the college's English Bible courses.

Writing God's Special Providential Care of the Scripture in the Bible Witness (Vol 2:4 October–December 2002), Timothy Tow affirmed his belief that the Textus Receptus (Received Text) of the KJV is preserved intact for the church so that "we can say we have the Word of God in our hands" – "kept pure in all ages", says the WCF – while modern Bible versions such as the NIV, which has Westcott and Hort's "corrupt" NT text with "changes and deletions in 9,900 places", are not.

Timothy Tow, like Ian Paisley and Edward F Hills, saw VPP as complementary to the doctrine of Verbal Plenary Inspiration ("VPI") and went on to write: "We believe the preservation of Holy Scripture and its Divine inspiration stand in the same position as providence and creation. If Deism teaches a Creator who goes to sleep after creating the world is absurd, to hold to the doctrine of inspiration without preservation is equally illogical. … Without preservation, all the inspiration, God-breathing into the Scriptures, would be lost. But we have a Bible so pure and powerful in every word and it is so because God has preserved it down through the ages."

==== FEBC and Life BPC on VPP ====
In line with the founding principal Timothy Tow's view, FEBC regards VPP to be a doctrine as old as the Bible itself which must be received by faith (Romans 10:17, Hebrews 11:6) together with the VPI doctrine, and FEBC asserts as among its seven tenets of VPP the following: (1) the VPP doctrine is based on WCF 1:8 which teaches that God has supernaturally preserved each and every one of His inspired Hebrew/Aramaic OT words and Greek NT words to the last jot and tittle (Matthew 5:18) so that His people will always have in their possession His infallible and inerrant Word kept intact without the loss of any word (Psalms 12:6–7, Matthew 5:18, Matthew 24:35, Mark 13:31, Luke 21:33, (John 10:35), (2) the "providential" preservation of Scriptures is understood as God's special and not general providence; (3) the Bible is not only infallible and inerrant in the past (in the Autographs), but also infallible and inerrant today (in the Apographs); and (4) the infallible and inerrant words of Scripture are found in the faithfully preserved Traditional/Byzantine/Majority manuscripts and fully represented in the Printed and Received Text (or Textus Receptus) that underlie the Reformation Bibles best represented by the KJV, and NOT in the corrupted and rejected texts of Westcott and Hort that underlie the many modern versions of the English Bible.

A majority of the Session of Life BPC in 2002, even though still pastored by Timothy Tow then, did not agree with the FEBC on the VPP doctrine which became an issue when Lim Teck Chye ("TC Lim"), an elder who had promoted among the leaders of LBPC the anti-KJV book One Bible Only? – Examining Exclusive Claims for the King James Bible (Roy Beacham and Kevin Bauder (Editors), Grand Rapids: Kregel, 2001), hereinafter One Bible Only?, spoke at its Adult Sunday School and distributed a paper Preserving Our Godly Path (signed by 21 leaders) on 1 December 2002 during which Jeffrey Khoo, who was present, was not given an opportunity to respond to TC Lim's view of "jot and tittle" preservation being only a theory (p. 9, Preserving Our Godly Path). The paper (undated) currently on Life BPC's website has apparently been amended as it refers (on p. 2) to Jeffrey Khoo's article A Plea for a Perfect Bible in the January 2003 issue of The Burning Bush defending the infallibility and inerrancy of the Greek Scriptures on which the KJV is based as a new view. (Khoo's article had been presented to the FEBC's Basic Theology for Everyone night class on Soteriology on 3 October 2002.)

Among the views in One Bible Only? are: (a) the Bible has no verse which explains how God will preserve His Word or teaches that God did preserve perfectly the original text of Scripture; (b) the preservation verses (e.g., Matthew 5:18, Matthew 24:35, Mark 13:31, Luke 21:33 and Psalm 12:6-7) cited by preservationists or VPPists as supporting the perfect preservation of God's Word by His special providence do not do so but they point rather to God's Word on the protection of His people (not His words) and on prophecies not failing but will all come to pass; (c) God's Word has not been perfectly or miraculously preserved in that some words might have been lost through negligence but the amount lost is so small that there is no effect on overall doctrine; (d) there are errors in the Hebrew manuscripts of the Old Testament such as the discrepancy between 2 Kings 8:26 and 2 Chronicles 22:2 regarding the age of king Ahaziah which needs correction by conjectural emendation; (e) God has providentially preserved His Word not in one manuscript or text type but in and through "all the extant manuscripts, versions and other copies of Scripture" (including Westcott and Hort's Greek New Testament); (f) no two manuscripts, no two editions of the Masoretic Text and no two editions of the Greek Textus Receptus are exactly the same; (g) the Scriptures teach only inspiration and inerrancy for only the autographs; and (h) our Bibles are reliable despite the non-perfect preservation of God's Word.

Apparently plagiarising the views of anti-KJV and anti-Preservation writers, the signatories of Preserving Our Godly Path made no reference to the anti-KJV book One Bible Only? promoted by TC Lim (see above) while adopting its views and modifying (e) above to limit the preservation of God's Word to only the Majority Text, Byzantine Text and Received Text (all editions) so as not to displace the long-entrenched position of Life BPC established by Timothy Tow in the use of the KJV as the exclusive English Bible for public reading, preaching and teaching (pp. 3–5 and 12, Preserving Our Godly Path). Other writers such as A. A. Hodge (p. 8,) and Rowland S Ward (pp. 9 and 13), who hold to similar views of the Bible being preserved only in essential purity (p. 8) by God's general providence without being 'jot and tittle' perfect (pp. 8–9), were instead cited with approval in Preserving Our Godly Path.

In Preserving Our Godly Path, on pp. 9–10, Life BPC quotes with approval the view of Rowland S Ward who sees (1) Matthew 5:18 as not referring to the transmission of the Scripture text; (2) the "jot and tittle" in the verse cannot produce a perfectly preserved text to serve as the ultimate standard of appeal; (3) the "Received Text" is not the best (NT) text that can be constructed from the Byzantine family of manuscripts as it is largely the text constructed from a few manuscripts of that family and the ingenuity of Erasmus and (4) that those whose Bibles are translated from the "impure" stream can also have the same appeal to inerrancy (pity them if they cannot) as the KJV since all the versions accepted by the churches usually agree, although they may differ and be defective at several minor points [these are the words of William Ames, a Puritan minister, quoted by Ward and emboldened and italicized by Life BPC for emphasis without doing the same for the critical qualifier in the words or sentence immediately after, "We must not rest forever in any accepted version, but faithfully see to it that a pure and faultless interpretation is given to the church"; VPPists are not opposed to translations as long as they have been faithfully translated from authentic original language Hebrew and Greek Scripture texts or words: the beginning of the quote on p. 9, "The Scriptures … ought not to be translated into other languages …" seems to paint that VPPists are opposed to translating the Bible into other languages – see "Isaac Ong joins in" below on the FEBC encouraging the translation of the Bible into foreign languages)]. Ward sees all manuscripts as preserved by God's providence without distinction or discrimination and is open to accepting bibles translated not from the same underlying texts as the KJV in the RSV (1956) and the ESV (2002, 2011, 2016), which use the 'less interpretative' approach for their translations, as well as the Good News Bible (1976) and the New Living Translation (1996), which use the 'dynamic equivalence' approach for their translations; Ward seems to prefer also the NKJV (1983) over the KJV, even though both have the same underlying texts and are translated from the 'less interpretative' approach, but footnote variations in the NKJV as well as the modern translations seem to appeal to Ward, and the NIV (1984, 2011) is seen by Ward as acceptable in conveying meaning with clarity and accuracy.

When Life BPC held its Annual Congregational Meeting ("ACM") on 25 April 2004, the then Assistant Pastors, Charles Seet and Colin Wong, and the four non-VPP elders issued Our Statement of Faith on the Preservation of God's Word – which appears to support the VPP position – to persuade members of the church that they too hold to the full preservation of God's Word and to vote out the VPP elders, who had refused to accept Pastor Tow's resignation. The version, currently on Life BPC's website, was amended for re-issuance on 8 November 2005 to add the names of three new non-VPP elders (who were previously deacons: see Preserving Our Godly Path).

Although Our Statement of Faith on the Preservation of God's Word on p. 2 states that "God has preserved His Word in the body of manuscripts (or texts or copies) after the original autographs were lost", D.A. Waite was criticised on pp. 3 and 13 of Preserving Our Godly Path for taking the view "that the words of the received Greek and Masoretic Hebrew texts that underlie the King James Bible are the very words which God has preserved down through the centuries, being the exact words of the originals themselves". Seet, Wong and the Life BPC elders in Our Statement of Faith on the Preservation of God's Word (p. 2) take a different view as they do not ascribe perfection (i.e., no errors) to the Hebrew and Greek texts underlying the KJV English Bible even though they state on the same page, as well as on p. 2 of Preserving Our Godly Path, that they have no doubt that the KJV "is the very Word of God". Han Soon Juan, who was one of the VPP elders ousted at the ACM of Life BPC on 25 April 2004 from the governance of the church (see above), finds it bewildering that they could claim the KJV is the very Word of God but yet believe the texts it was translated from contain errors as it escapes him "how the translation could be superior to the original texts".

The late Garnet Howard Milne (hereinafter Milne) in Has the Bible been kept pure? The Westminster Confession of Faith and the providential preservation of Scripture (hereinafter Has the Bible been kept pure?) says that politicians and theologians today often speak ambiguously to appeal to those they disagree with or to deceive those they speak to. In addition to Preserving Our Godly Path and Our Statement of Faith on the Preservation of God's Word, Life BPC's stance on the VPP issue can be examined at Our Stand on the Preservation of Scriptures, which also has articles from the Chinese Session of Calvary Pandan BPC and BP ministers such as Philip Heng and Jack Sin. The FEBC's VPP stand can also be examined at Articles in Defence of Verbal Plenary Preservation, which has articles also from non-FEBC members such as Thomas Strouse, Edward Hills and Robert Sargent.

==== Tang Poh Geok joins in ====
Although the main difference between Charles Seet (Life BPC) and Jeffrey Khoo (FEBC) is in the latter holding to a present perfect Bible in the VPP doctrine compared to the former who does not, Tang Poh Geok ("PG Tang") – a B-P church member who held herself out as a lecturer in Law and Psychology with a PhD – wrote to Quek Suan Yew ("SY Quek"), the pastor of Calvary Pandan BPC, on 1 February 2008 to allege, inter alia, that he is "a modern heretic because he holds to a miraculous preservation as concocted by Rev Dr Jeffrey [Khoo]" and "is falsely accusing Rev Charles Seet and the BOE Life B-P Church that there are mistakes in the Word of God".

==== Isaac Ong joins in ====
Isaac Ong, (Senior) Pastor of Calvary (Jurong) BPC took issue with Carol Lee on VPP by castigating her as relying on emotion and not pursuing truth relentlessly even though he (Isaac) remarked that "all Bible-believing Christians can and ought to agree and subscribe to" the Scriptural passages (e.g., Matthew 5:18, Matthew 24:35, and Psalm 12:6-7) quoted by Lee in her article A Child of God Looks at the Doctrine of Verbal Plenary Preservation on pp. 69–72 in the July 2005 issue of The Burning Bush to support the VPP doctrine or the entire preservation of God's Word.

Isaac Ong, however, accused Carol Lee of hiding or not stating the real issue to be that of "those who hold to VPP as a doctrine believe that the Word of God is uniquely, miraculously, and perfectly preserved in one single copy of Greek text known as the Textus Receptus" while upholding "the traditional Hebrew Masoretic Text and Greek Textus Receptus underlying the King James Bible to be the totally inspired and entirely preserved Word of God" (The Burning Bush, July 2004, p. 65) and identifying themselves as "KJV/TR-Only advocates in their affirmation of the twin doctrines of the verbal and plenary inspiration and preservation of God's words" (The Burning Bush, Jan. 2004, p. 3).

VPP is taught in a 10-lesson course The Doctrine of Verbal Plenary Preservation in which Lee teaches lesson 3 on the foundation or the fundamentals/basics of VPP at Biblical Support for VPP (I), and Jeffrey Khoo teaches the more advanced phase on the identification of the VPP text or words in lesson 8 and lesson 9. The editorial in The Burning Bush, July 2004, p. 65 cited by Ong says, "The College Board and Faculty affirm the 100% inspiration and 100% preservation of the Holy Scriptures …", before going on to declare univocally "the traditional Hebrew Masoretic Text and Greek Textus Receptus underlying the King James Bible to be the totally inspired and entirely preserved Word of God". Was Lee, a FEBC faculty member, hiding her view if the July 2004 issue of The Burning Bush had already revealed the FEBC's VPP view, as well as Carol's, before her article A Child of God Looks at the Doctrine of Verbal Plenary Preservation was published in the July 2005 issue?

The January 2004 issue that Ong claims VPPists identify themselves as "KJV-TR only advocates" also precedes the July 2005 issue. Even though students are taught the Traditional Hebrew Masoretic Text and the Greek Textus Receptus published by the TBS in the college's biblical language and literature classes while the KJV continues to be the only acceptable version for use in the English Bible courses (see "Timothy Tow on VPP" above), the FEBC does not discourage its foreign students from reading the Bibles in their own native tongues; they are advised to use the best, most accurate, most reliable version that they have in their native language, and to go back to the inspired and preserved original language Scriptures which FEBC has identified to be those behind the faithful KJV, and not the corrupt modern versions, to check for accuracy and fullness of meaning even as FEBC, like the Westminster divines, upholds that the Holy Scriptures "are to be translated into the vulgar language of every nation unto which they come, that, the Word of God dwelling plentifully in all, they may worship Him in an acceptable manner; and through patience and comfort of the Scriptures, may have hope" (WCF 1:8) in the FEBC's reaffirmation of the Biblical Reformed Faith which encourages the accurate translation of foreign language Bibles according to the Reformation Text underlying the KJV. Isaac Ong studied at the FEBC and Bob Jones University ("BJU").

Jeffrey Khoo wrote a response to Isaac Ong's article by quoting Ong and reframing the questions posed by him with asking if "God-fearing and God-honouring Christians" who subscribe to certain fundamental doctrines — including Richard Baxter (1615–1691), John Owen (1616–1683), John Wesley (1703–1791), John Gill (1697–1771), Charles Spurgeon (1834–1892) Francis Turretin (1623–1687), John William Burgon (1813–1888) and G I Williamson whose words Ong had quoted and Khoo also explained or commented – had indeed rejected the VPP of Scripture, or that they actually believed that: (1) God did not infallibly preserve His words, (2) God did allow some of His inspired words to be utterly lost and completely corrupted without any hope of restoration and (3) God took a "hands off" approach to the preservation of His inspired words and did not care at all to intervene in history to correct the intentional or unintentional mistakes the scribes made in their copying of the Scriptures so as to restore for His people all of His inspired words and identify for them where these are precisely.

When Ong joined the debate somewhat belatedly (his church was portrayed by him as "longsuffering" in silence), probably not long after July 2005, Life BPC had changed its position from non-jot-and-tittle preservation in 2002 to "full preservation" in Our Statement of Faith on the Preservation of God's Word in 2004 – which was done probably out of expediency at the ACM in April 2004 rather than conviction as the "change" was done without quoting in the statement any preservation verses. (See "FEBC and Life BPC on VPP" above on the issuance of Our Statement of Faith on the Preservation of God's Word at Life BPC's ACM and "Life BPC's Lawsuit against FEBC" below on Life BPC in January 2008 changing or declaring its position to be "non-VPP".)

==== Joshua Lim Heong Wee and Philip Tang KH join in ====
Joshua Lim Heong Wee and Philip Tang KH, in their rejoinder Kicking Against The Pricks to Jeffrey Khoo's Kicking Against The Pricks: the SCCC contradicts the ICCC on VPP, claim that Khoo is "confused" in saying that the Hebrew/Aramaic words of the Masoretic Text and the Greek words of the Textus Receptus are the very inspired and preserved words of God.

They were refuted in their claim by Paul Ferguson who found their article VPP: Kicking Against the Pricks published in the Far Eastern Beacon by the Singapore Council of Christian Churches ("SCCC"), the national affiliate of the ICCC in Singapore, to be "a strange kind of defence [in the SCCC saying it is consistent with the ICCC]" as even at first glance the defence is "riddled with inaccuracies, incoherent inconsistencies and absurd definitions" and contradicts and undermines the original resolution in 1998 of the ICCC by describing it as "ignorant" of the CUV's use to save millions of Chinese Christians through famous evangelists like Wang Ming Dao and John Sung Shang Chieh while not telling the article's readers whether they [Joshua Lim and Philip Tang] believe God has preserved more of His Words in the text underlying the CUV or the KJV (which is the critical issue here) and in so doing, they seem to imply that "the ICCC was an extreme King James Version Only (KJVO) organisation".

==== Philip Heng Swee Choon joins in ====
Philip Heng Swee Choon, Advisory Pastor of Galilee BPC, takes a different view on inspiration as he claimed to have not heard that "the Bible was inspired in any version or translation or manuscripts other than the original manuscripts". Even though Life BPC declares in What We Believe on its website on "the KJV Bible to be nothing less than God's powerful inspired Word, just as any faithful translation of God's Word into any language can also be presented as being His inspired word" and on the apostle Paul in 2 Timothy 3:15-17 calling the Scriptures that Timothy had as "inspired" despite the fact that he had only a copy (either the Old Testament in Hebrew or a Greek translation of the Old Testament), Life BPC seems happy to ignore Heng's confusion or ignorance and put up his article dated 26 April 2008 misrepresenting that VPP is perfect KJV, and the KJV is "100% perfect, equivalent or the replica of the original Word of God" – not unlike Michael D Sproul in the U.S who, seemingly misinformed, claimed without basis that Jeffrey Khoo (like Ruckman) "believes that God inspired the [KJV] translators to create a new edition of the TR by the Word choices in English", the translators are "perfect" so that "no one can ever touch the TR of the King James translators' creation" and, above all, spread the serious falsehood that the young Turks in the VPP leaders over whom Waite "has had tremendous influence" [Jeffrey Khoo and SY Quek] had forced out the senior leader and founder of the BP movement to the rejoicing of Satan and the quenching of the Holy Spirit.

Heng claims that he was taught that the inspiration of the Bible was in the original languages of Greek and Hebrew and he understood from the BP Church's constitution that this refers to only the original manuscripts or the Autographs. But Article 4.2.1 is precise in that the inspired Scriptures the B-P Church believes to be infallible and inerrant are the Scriptures in the original languages and not simply and only the autographs. The words of Article 4.2.1 are: "We believe in the divine, verbal and plenary inspiration of the Scriptures in the original languages, their consequent inerrancy and infallibility, and, as the Word of God, the Supreme and final authority in faith and life" (italics added to the words "original languages").

Generations of Reformed, including John Owen and Francis Turretin, "held to the preservation of the God-breathed text, the inspired text in the copies and not merely in the autographa", mirroring the views of the Westminster divines contemporaneous with or before them, and Richard Muller sums up the position of the 17th century Protestant orthodox in Dictionary of Latin and Greek Theological Terms (Grand Rapids: Baker, 1985), 53-54 thus:

The Protestant scholastics do not press the point made by their nineteenth-century followers that the infallibility of Scripture and the freedom of Scripture from error reside absolutely in the autographa, and only in the derivative sense in the apographa; rather, the scholastics argue positively that the apographa preserve intact the true words of the prophets and that the God-breathed (theopneustos) character of Scripture is manifest in the apographa as well as in the autographa. In other words, the issue primarily addressed by the seventeenth-century orthodox in their discussion of the autographa is the continuity of the extant copies in Hebrew and in Greek with the originals both quoad res, with respect to the thing or subject of the text, and quoad verba, with respect to the words of the text.

Unlike Timothy Tow, who was named in the obituary of Allan MacRae as among the scholars of calibre trained under MacRae and who had written many theological books in Tow's own name, Heng (who does not seem to have authored any book) is not known for the depth of theological knowledge but for his belief and practice of "exorcism". The FEBC board disapproved of Heng's practice of casting out demons and he resigned from the FEBC on 7 March 1989; the Session (except for a deacon) of Galilee BPC, Heng's own church, also did not agree with him on his practice of "exorcism" and two other issues but the congregation voted to retain him as pastor by a two-to-one vote.

Heng claims to have written his article Regarding the Inspiration of the Bible on his own accord as he says he feels duty-bound to write the truth as he knows it and claims that he loves and respects brethren on both sides of the issue. Apparently aware that Timothy Tow had written to Life BPC on 4 January 2008 to plead with it to live peaceably with FEBC by respecting the College's right to use the church sanctuary and to heed God's command against removing ancient landmarks (Proverbs 22:28), Heng turned this verse on Biblical land law on its head by applying it to caution FEBC to "[r]emove not the ancient landmark, which thy fathers have set" in respect of the doctrine of the church. But Timothy Tow was the founding pastor who had set the doctrinal landmark of the Singapore BPC as her first (and only) theologian at her founding. He was still around to defend the VPP doctrine in April 2008 when Heng wrote his article as Timothy Tow was named as one of the defendants in the lawsuit commenced by Life BPC against the FEBC directors in September 2008 to evict them from operating the FEBC on the Gilstead Road premises teaching and preaching VPP (see "Life BPC's Lawsuit against FEBC" below).

SH Tow, another founding leader of the Singapore BPC, in the 60th anniversary magazine of the Bible-Presbyterian Movement 1950–2010 wrote: "The group of dissenters have erroneously labelled 'VPP' a new doctrine and 'heresy' … [with] no factual support. On the contrary, the doctrine of divine textual preservation has been the stand and contention of the original B-P founding pastor Timothy Tow all along, for how could 'VPI' [also a new acronym] stand without the undergirding support of 'VPP'? Surely the 'Inspired' words could not have survived the ravages of time but for the divine Hand of God perfectly preserving each and every word of the source texts of both the OT and NT"; and he [SH Tow] then went on to remark, "The dissenters are in serious error to label the doctrine of 'VPP' as new, just because they became aware of it only about the year 2002. But my book Beyond Versions (1998) had mentioned the divinely 'preserved' text in six places, only without the initials 'VPP'. For example, on page 109, I had written of the KJB in these words: 'It is … the authoritative and accurate translation into English of the plenarily and verbally inspired, inerrant, preserved Hebrew and Greek Words of God'."

Heng, like Joshua Lim, was a witness for Life BPC in its unsuccessful lawsuit to evict the FEBC from the Gilstead Road premises. (See also "Life BPC's Lawsuit against FEBC" below.) Heng, who had served as Assistant Pastor to Timothy Tow at Life BPC from 1963–1970, was said by Joshua Lim on p. 186 of Heritage & Legacy (2018) to have in particular his relationship with Timothy Tow stretched to breaking point as he [Heng] had accepted an invitation in 1969 to speak at a Methodist church against the BPC's stance of separation (from churches in the modernist ecumenical fold); and, after Tow had left for a 5-month sabbatical leave in the Holy Land in July 1969, Joshua Lim seemed to be hoping that Tow would not return to pastor Life BPC (based on talk Joshua Lim claimed to have heard) even though the plan before Tow left was to return to pastor the church and this was followed through with Heng resigning subsequently in August 1970 despite Joshua Lim saying (also in Heritage & Legacy, p. 186) that the votes of the Session of Life BPC were skewed towards Heng.

==== Jack Sin joins in ====
Jack Sin, currently [December 2021] pastor of Sovereign Hope BPC, joined the debate with his article entitled "A Grave Matter: Verity, Sagacity and Clarity in the Textual Debate", a copy of which is still on Life B-P Church's website. Sin was previously the pastor of Maranatha BPC and the first Dean of students of ERBC before he left in January 2018 – a year after ERBC's inauguration in January 2017. Sin's undated article was written in or after 2007 as it made reference on p. 1 to the 2007 Membership Handbook of Maranatha BPC.

Sin commences his article by stating on p. 1 that "[a]n objective and biblical appraisal" of the VPP debate is required. However, Biak Lawm Thang, in "A Review of Jack Sin's Article, 'A Grave Matter: Verity, Sagacity and Clarity in the Textual Debate'" in the July 2008 issue of The Burning Bush, concludes that "[n]either was [Sin] fair in his quotation of the works of others nor unbiased in his presentation of the opposing view" and "[h]is appraisal which is destitute of biblical proof, citing only human authorities with partial quotations, cannot be considered 'biblical' or 'objective' or 'honest'".

Sin states on p. 4 of his article that "the frequent quoting of the scripture verses like Psalm 12:6–7; Matthew 5:18; 24:35; Psalm 19:7; 1 Corinthians 13:8, Isaiah 40:8 and Psalm 119:89 [by FEBC] do not support the VPP teaching of a perfect TR of 1611." But these verses were not used by FEBC, where Sin had served as a faculty member until 2007, or VPP proponents to identify the TR of 1611 but only used as a prelude or a foundational argument against VPP opponents who do not believe that God's words have been fully preserved.

While Sin decried that the verses quoted by VPP proponents do not support a perfect TR of 1611, Sin himself (on page 3 of his article) uses two of the verses – Isaiah 40:8 and Psalm 119:89 – to support his belief that God's words are fully preserved "in the body of the Byzantine or Traditional complete family of texts (as opposed to the inferior Alexandrian text type)" even though these two verses also do not identify the "Byzantine or Traditional complete family of texts".

Sin says "the TR underlying the KJV is a subset … of the Byzantine family type text" and "the very words of God in scripture are preserved perpetually altogether but NOT necessarily only in the TR that undergird [sic] the KJV" as "[i]t [sic] is [sic] found in all the providentially preserved Majority or Traditional or Byzantine Greek manuscripts of over 5,000 …" However, a set must contain all the elements of its subset, which means that the TR underlying the KJV can only be a subset of the larger Majority or Traditional or Byzantine Greek manuscripts set if all the words of the TR are in this larger set. The Majority Text does not have all the words of the TR. While the TR is a form of the majority text in that the TR does represent the majority of textual witnesses in most readings, it is not entirely a "majority text" and there are other essential factors beyond merely examining the extant manuscripts in determining the true reading of Scripture: the Johannine Comma in 1 John 5:7, "For there are three that bear record in heaven, the Father, the Word, and the Holy Ghost: and these three are one (with the Comma in italics), is a well-known example in that while there is manuscript evidence for this TR reading, the majority of existing manuscripts do not support the inclusion of this reference to the Triune Godhead; the Hodges-Farstad majority text, which has almost 1900 differences with the TR, does not have the Johannine Comma. And David Cloud says, "But now we have Peter Ruckman on one side with his strange spirit and odd, twisted ideas [of the English KJV being more inspired than the underlying Greek NT text or words] and on the other side those who want to correct the God-honored and preserved Textus Receptus by the so-called Majority text. Only the devil sows confusion, though he often is able to use even saved men for his evil deeds as he did Peter that sad day." One Bible Only? on p. 85, quoting current leading textual critic Dan Wallace on p. 83, indicates that there are 1,838 differences between the Textus Receptus and the Majority Text; and the chart on p. 85 lists in columnar form some differences, including the TR having the Trinitarian formula of 1 John 5:7-8 while the MT does not.

Biak notes Sin saying that he believes the Byzantine family of manuscripts, not the Alexandrian family, preserves the words of God, but when it comes to the Greek printed texts that represent those over 5,000 manuscripts, Sin's commitment to "honesty" made him uncertain or unable to know or identify the inspired and preserved words in the various editions of the TR and, at this point, he disagrees with Edward F Hills, whom Sin appears to follow as he quotes Hills frequently as an authority, who had no problem identifying the Greek Text of the KJV to be God's approved Text, and a portion of Hills's words – which Sin failed to quote despite claiming a quest for "honesty" in biblical scholarship – reads:

But what do we do in these few places in which the several editions of the Textus Receptus disagree with one another? Which text do we follow? The answer to this question is easy. We are guided by the common faith. Hence we favour that form of the Textus Receptus upon which more than any other God, working providentially, has placed the stamp of His approval, namely the King James Version, or, more precisely, the Greek text underlying the King James Version (italics added by Biak).

Biak also writes that it is a fact, admitted by VPPists, that there exists variant readings in the Greek manuscripts that number over 5,000 and that even in the TR editions there are a few minor differences but despite this, Hills (and others as well) does recognise the existence of those variants and the difficulty in making textual decisions in certain cases but yet does not stop there, for a specific identification of the text is necessary if every word of God is to be authoritative, and he did identify the KJV Greek Text to be the God-approved Text per his words quoted above. For practical purposes, others like the Trinitarian Bible Society, which has been quoted by Sin as another authority, also uses the KJV Greek Text as edited by Scrivener. (See also "KJV and VPP" under "Isaac Ong joins in" above.)

The TR underlying the KJV is the best and purest for it perfectly preserves all the words of God originally given by divine inspiration so that holding the TR of the KJV in their hands, VPPists can say without apology, "This is the very Word of God": the issue or debate is not about translations, but the Bible in the original languages. Holding such a position means that there is no need for the Bible scholar to practise textual criticism as the Bible scholar can confidently use and devote his time to the sincere exposition of the truth of God's words, not doubting the text at all; Hills is thus an "honest" textual scholar, for though he recognises the difficulty in the textual issue, he calls on Christians to be guided by "the logic of faith" to identify specifically the Greek Text of the KJV to be the God-approved Text in the light of God's special providence, with Biak seeing "honesty" in the textual debate as not failing to mention Hills's precise identification of the providentially preserved and authentic Text to be the Greek Text of the KJV.

Sin says on p. 2 of his article, "In some places the Authorised Version corresponds but loosely with any form of the Greek original, while it follows exactly the Latin Vulgate". Scrivener himself in the footnote on p. 656 of The New Testament in Greek according to the Text Followed in the Authorised Version had indicated, "The text of Beza 1598 has been left unchanged when the variation from it [Beza 1598] made in the Authorised Version is not countenanced by any earlier edition of the Greek" so that the integrity of the original Greek words in the TR has been preserved by him [Scrivener] not back-translating from the Latin Vulgate in the few places where the KJV seems to follow closely the Vulgate. Sin also says on p. 5 of his article, "No translation of one language to another will ever be perfect, regardless how learned the translators were or how superior the underlying texts or techniques may be ..." And VPPists do not take a different view that a translation, including the KJV, can be perfect. The original language Scripture (apographs or apograph), from which the 1611 KJV was translated, is regarded by VPPists as the perfect platinum yardstick of the Smithsonian Institution, inerrant, infallible, authoritative while the KJV and other accurate and reliable translations are like the common yardstick as good and safe enough for use.

The KJV translators used mainly Beza's 1598 edition but they also consulted the editions of Erasmus and Stephanus and the Complutensian Polygot. However, they did not publish the Greek text from which they worked to show the Greek words they had used to translate the KJV. F. H. A Scrivener (1813–1891) reconstructed such a text after examining eighteen editions of the TR to produce an edition of the Greek New Testament which more closely underlies the text of the AV than any one edition of the TR. This edition, published posthumously in 1894, is currently printed by the TBS and has approximately 190 differences compared with Beza 1598 and 283 differences compared with Stephanus 1550 but these differences are minor and pale into insignificance when compared with the approximately 6,000 differences – many of which are quite substantial – between the Critical Text and the Textus Receptus.

Scrivener's The New Testament In The Original Greek Together With The Variations Adopted In The Revised Version (Cambridge: The University Press) issued in 1881 has a 9-page appendix at pp. 648–656 with a list of items in the Beza 1598 text that Scrivener had changed to match the readings of the King James Version on the authority of certain earlier Greek editions, and a second list of readings different from the KJV readings which were not changed as Scrivener could not find any earlier Greek text to countenance the variations in this list.

==== Puritans, Reformers and Westminster Divines ====
Milne in Has the Bible been kept pure?, 164 says that Johannes Buxtorf Sr., in his work, Tiberias, sive Commentarius Masorethicus, uses early Church Father Justin Martyr (100-165 A.D.) to reinforce the truth that the singular providence of God kept the Hebrew Bible 'uncorrupt' (Tiberias, 7) as "the Masoretes were diligent in their work in preserving Scripture to prevent not only any word but even so much as the least tittle being impaired or lost" alluding to Matthew 5:18; and the Westminster authorities, as with Buxtorf, viewed the intention of providence as not to present a preserved Scripture to the church at the end of the nineteenth or twentieth centuries, but to make the same Scriptures available 'in all ages' and this concept that God preserved the Scriptures in their original purity runs counter to the prevailing orthodoxy that the definitive text of Scripture is yet to be delineated – which is also a concept that B B Warfield adopted or reinterpreted when he made room for the conclusions of textual critics like Westcott and Hort.

Milne in Has the Bible been kept pure? also writes that Presbyterian William Jenkyn, who succeeded the distinguished Westminster divine William Gouge at West Friars London, believed with Augustine and William Whitaker that the "inspired words had been preserved and could be identified [bold added] and that if they could not, they could have no assurance that they have the Word of God at all". After quoting Whitaker – Professor of Divinity at Cambridge from 1575–1595 and regarded by Wayne Spear as the most significant influence on Chapter One of the WCF (The Westminster Confession of Faith and Holy Scripture, Carson and Hall (eds.), To Glorify and Enjoy God, Edinburgh: Banner of Truth (1994), 88) – in Disputation on Holy Scripture (Cambridge: The University Press (1849), 328), Milne goes on to write that "the canon of Scriptures was confirmed and received individually throughout the centuries ever since God had dictated those Scriptures for the church" and this means "the common or received Greek text of the New Testament and the Masoretic text of the Old" [bold added] which Whitaker sees as "the authentic texts of Scripture" and such a view precludes the possibility of discovering any ancient codex in the future that would recalibrate the Word of God with a fundamentally different text than the one "endorsed by the Holy Spirit in the multitude of believers".

Milne in Has the Bible been kept pure? 104 & 107-108, quoting Westminster divine Joseph Caryl (1602–1673) on Matthew 5:18 in An Exposition with practicall observations continued upon the Thirty-fifth….Thirty-seventh Chapters of the Book of Job (London: M. Simmons (1664), 525) and Caryl's fellow divine William Twisse (1577/8-1646) in The Scriptures Sufficiency To Determine All Matters of Faith, Made Good against the Papist: OR, That a Christian May be Infallibly Certain of His Faith and Religion by the Holy Scriptures (London: Matthew Keynton (1656)), makes the point that the words of God delivered still exist in the extant text which contains no contradictions (see also "Francis Turretin on real contradictions" above) and "[w]hen the Westminster Assembly came to compose the Chapter on Scripture in the Confession of Faith, the perfect and holy doctrines, matter and words of Scripture, were deemed to be preserved in the pure extant original language texts of Hebrew and Greek" – the purity in view being perfect or total as it is God who kept the original language texts of Scripture pure by His 'singular care and providence', and while His overruling providence does not imply that the autographic originals were to be produced perfectly in every copy down through the ages, "the stress of God's 'singular care' emphasises the personal nature of God's intentions to preserve the original language texts for the use of His church in all ages"; and a special providence, not a general providence, is in view.

Milne additionally in Has the Bible been kept pure?, 124 after quoting Westminster divine William Strong (d. 1654) in his A Treatise Shewing the Subordination of the Will of Man unto the Will of God (London: Francis Tyton (1657), 69) and fellow divine Edward Reynolds (1599–1676) in The First Sermon upon Hosea (London: Thomas Newcomb for Robert Bostock (1649), 132-133), writes that there is no hint in the thinking or preaching of the Westminster divines that "the Bible was imperfect and required further work by Bible critics, even reaching several hundred years into the future".

After examining the words and works of many Westminster divines and puritans before, contemporaneous with, and after the divines, Milne in "Chapter 7: A Biblical Summary of the Reformed Epistemology" (Has the Bible been kept pure?, 291-305) writes on p. 297 that God's character requires that He keeps to His promise to preserve His word down to the very small marks of the letters, the jots and tittles of it (Matthew 5:18) for all ages of the Church; and on pp. 299–300 Milne says that "it is true that God has not promised to maintain a single codex of both Testaments down through the ages, but as the believing church has always taught, God's Word is locatable [bold added] in the Masoretic text of the Old Testament and the Greek common or majority text of the New" and "[t]hese texts have not been hidden", and, "[w]here there are variants in the manuscripts, the church has not found it an onerous task to collate the texts and arrive at the authentic autographic text" because "the Holy Spirit has confirmed the divine authority of this Word in the hearts of His people down through the ages" while "those who are not spiritually awakened … will not recognise the divine authority of the Scriptures, nor submit to them".

Peter Van Kleeck Jr. says "[i]t is irresponsible to assume that John Calvin, William Whitaker, the Westminster divines, and Francis Turretin were unaware of the discrepancies present in the extant textual tradition"; he [Van Kleeck] notes that Turretin in Institutes (P&R: 1992, Vol. I,111) writes that they, as well as [church fathers and theologians] Origen and Theodoret of Cyrrhus, knew of "many variant readings … in both the Old and New Testaments arising from comparison of different manuscripts", but they "deny corruption (at least corruption that is universal)", and the Westminster Divines and the Reformed tradition as a whole claim "God's immediately inspired words have been kept pure in all ages" as above all those corruptions and variants stood the Scriptures which Turretin separates from the "various manuscripts" since he also writes in Institutes of the corruptions as "not universal in all the manuscripts; or they are not such as cannot easily be corrected from a collation of Scriptures and the various manuscripts".

Westminster divine Richard Capel stresses the importance of the Fountains (i.e., the original language copies or apographs) running clear since "if the Fountains run not clear, the translations cannot be clean", as he (Capel) says "[i]t's out of question that the same God, who committed the Oracles to the Jews, did also take care that they should preserve them safe and sure, uncorrupt and pure" and expects that the 'Church of the Gentles' similarly "have and do preserve the Greek Text uncorrupt, and clear" (Capel's Remains (London: John Bartlet, 1658), 40, 41 & 80). Westminster divine Daniel Featley says that the Bible Translated is the undoubted Word of God in as far only as it agrees with the Bible in the original languages (London: N.B. and Richard Royston (1647), Katabaptistal, Dipper dist Or, The Anabaptists Duck'd and Plung'd over head and ears, at a disputation in Southwark, 1); Featley implies that it is indeed possible to have an accurate translation or one translation may be better than another as he does indicate that the KJV is better than the Geneva Bible since the latter had many errors of translation corrected in the former. The Greek original means the Greek copies per Puritan William Fulke who says, "We say indeed, that by the Greek text of the New Testament all translations of the New Testament must be tried; but we mean not by every corruption that is in any Greek copy of the New Testament."

==== Life BPC's Lawsuit against FEBC ====
Although Life BPC pastors and elders in Our Statement of Faith on the Preservation of God's Word claimed they "hold to an INERRANT and INFALLIBLE Bible and the FULL preservation of God's holy Word", the Board of Elders ("BOE") declared in Mark Them Which Cause Divisions in January 2008 Life BPC's position to be non-VPP and required FEBC to give a written unconditional undertaking that the college would not promote the VPP doctrine in its night classes or it would not be allowed to use the premises from that month onwards as the BOE viewed VPP to be a heresy because it is 'new', 'infectious' and 'dangerous'.

Brutus Balan (now (i.e., November 2021) retired from pastoring Faith Baptist Church in Hobart, Tasmania) wrote a letter dated 30 January 2008 addressed to Charles Seet and the BOE of Life BPC with a plea to them to avoid carrying out their legal threat to evict FEBC from the Gilstead Road premises and remarking that Seet and the elders had the most inconsistent and contradictory position over the matter – saying the original writings (autographs) were 'inerrant, infallible' in the past and the 'providentially preserved' copies (apographs) today have errors while claiming to hold to an 'INERRANT and INFALLIBLE BIBLE and the FULL preservation of God's holy Word' with their use of 'full' for 'not full' preservation being deceptive – but yet accused the FEBC of heresy.

FEBC rebutted Life BOE's Mark Them Which Cause Divisions with Jeffrey Khoo's response headed Making the Word of God of None Effect which argued that without a presently infallible and inerrant Word of God to the jot and tittle (Matt 5:18), the elders of Life BPC had no basis to condemn VPP as a heresy and VPP proponents as heretics.

Paul Ferguson joined in the debate with his paper also entitled Mark Them Which Cause Divisions to criticise Life BPC for misusing the word "heresy"; maligning godly men like the three Tow brothers (Timothy, SH and Siang Yeow) as "heretics"; displaying inconsistency and muddled up thinking on the VPP issue; stating that the words of God have indeed been perfectly preserved but teaching implicitly that no one can find them all at one time and place them in one Book so that a person can read from Genesis to Revelation every perfect word of God in the originals today; endorsing the different positions of institutions (BJU and Central Baptist Theological Seminary) in their claims of superior Alexandrian texts or disavowal of preservation as a doctrine of the ancient church and the beliefs of BP ministers (Tan Eng Boo and Colin Wong) who believe that there are "better" extant Greek texts than the "best" Greek texts underlying the KJV; totally misrepresenting the VPP position as a "new" concept; misunderstanding and misapplying Spurgeon's words of "nothing new in theology save that which is false"; and showing poor scholarship and research in plagiarising the views of anti-KJV and anti-Preservation writers while ignoring the many churches and persons who are pro-KJV and VPP.

The pleas and admonitions did not stop Life BPC commencing Suit 648 in the High Court on 15 September 2008 against the directors of the FEBC, including Timothy Tow, to evict or stop them from operating the college on the Gilstead Road premises so that Life BPC could take over the operations of a Bible college with the FEBC name or with another name. Litigation was commenced even though Charles Seet himself had preached a sermon entitled "Can Christians Sue One Another?" based on 1 Cor 6:1-8 and published this as an article in the LBPC's weekly of 23 May 2004, shortly after the ACM on 25 April 2004 where the two Assistant Pastors and the non-VPP elders had presented their VPP-like Our Statement of Faith on the Preservation of God's Word to the congregation in their bid to oust en masse the VPP elders (who had refused to accept the resignation of Timothy Tow as Pastor) from continuing to rule the church (see "FEBC and Life BPC on VPP" above), to apparently urge those ousted to follow the example of the Lord Jesus Christ to absorb whatever grief or loss caused to them and not sue fellow Christians in secular courts.

However, Life BPC failed as the Court of Appeal held unanimously on 26 April 2011 – after examining WCF 1:8 – that:

1. "the VPP doctrine is actually closely related to the VPI doctrine which both parties [i.e., the College and the Church] adhere to," (rejecting the Church's contention in [59] of the Court of Appeal Judgement that it is "an entirely different creature from the VPI doctrine)"";
2. "the College, in adopting the VPP doctrine, has not deviated from the fundamental principles which guide and inform the work of the College right from its inception, and as expressed in the Westminster Confession";
3. "[i]t is not inconsistent for a Christian who believes fully in the principles contained within the Westminster Confession (and the VPI doctrine) to also subscribe to the VPP doctrine"; and
4. "[i]n the absence of anything in the Westminster Confession that deals with the status of the apographs, we [the Court] hesitate to find that the VPP doctrine is a deviation from the principles contained within the Westminster Confession".

(See also "Leadership of Fundamentalist Faction" above)

== See also ==
- Religion in Singapore
