= Queck =

Queck is a German surname. Notable people with the surname include:

- Elise Queck (married Augustat; 1889– 1940), German politician
- Gustav Queck (1822–1897), German educator and classical philologist
- Horst Queck (1943–2025), German ski jumper
- Manfred Queck (1941–1977), German ski jumper
- Richard Queck (1888–1968), German footballer

== See also ==
- Quek
