= Ferdinand Gotthelf Hand =

German classical scholar (1786–1851)

Ferdinand Gotthelf Hand (15 February 1786 – 14 March 1851), German classical scholar, was born at Plauen in Saxony.

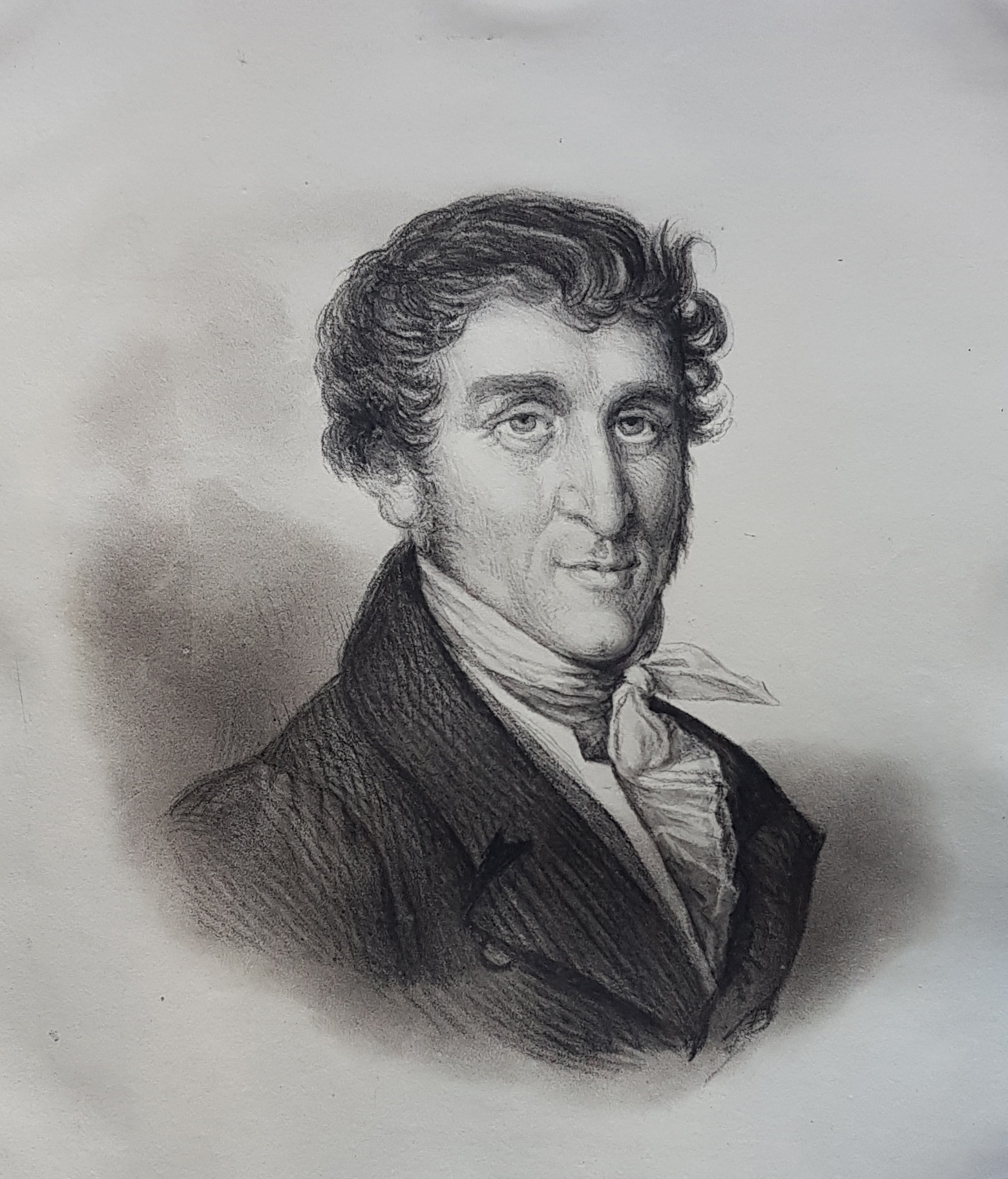

He studied at Leipzig. In 1810 he became professor at the Weimar gymnasium, and in 1817 professor of philosophy and Greek literature at the University of Jena, where he remained till his death.

The work by which Hand is chiefly known is his (unfinished) edition of the treatise of Horatius Tursellinus (Orazio Torsellino, 1545–1599) on the Latin particles (Tursellinus, seu de particulis Latinis commentarii, 1829–1845). Like his treatise on Latin style (Lehrbuch des lateinischen Stils, 3rd ed. by H.L. Schmitt, 1880), it is too abstruse and philosophical for the use of the ordinary student.

Hand was also an enthusiastic musician, and in his "Asthetik der Tonkunst" (1837-1841) he was the first to introduce the subject of musical aesthetics. The first part of the last-named work has been translated into English by W.E. Lawson ("Aesthetics of Musical Art, or The Beautiful in Music", 1880), and B. Sears's "Classical Studies" (1849) contains a "History of the Origin and Progress of the Latin Language", abridged from Hand's work on the subject. There is a memoir of his life and work by Gustav Queck (Jena, 1852).
