= Orazio Torsellino =

Italian historian (1545–1599)

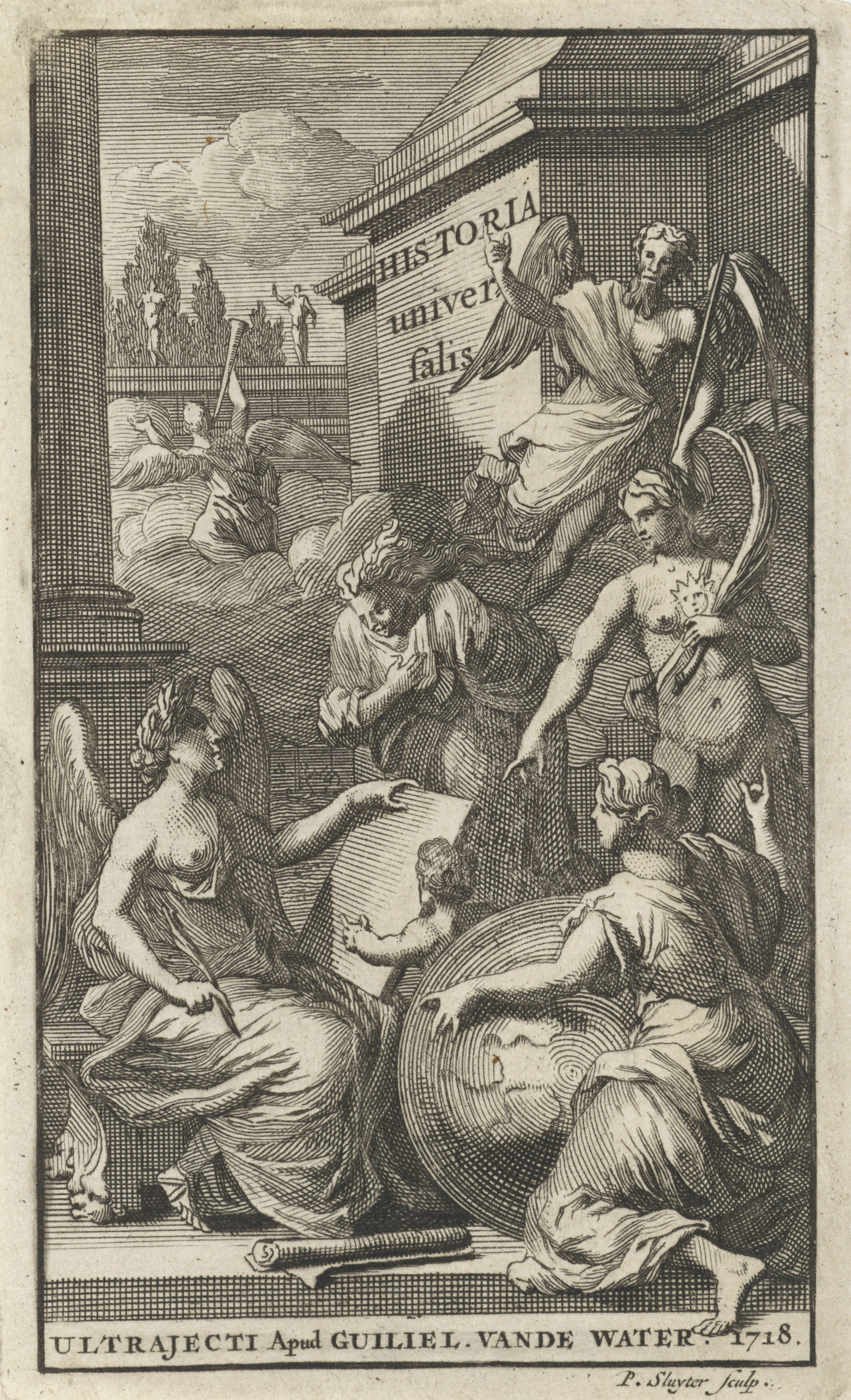
Title page of Orazio Torsellino's Historia universalis, Utrecht, 1718

Orazio Torsellino (Latin: Horatius Torsellinus; 1545 – 6 April 1599) was an Italian historian, classical philologist and man of letters.

== Biography ==
Born in Rome in 1545, Torsellino joined the Jesuit order. He taught literature for twenty years at the Roman College. He was later entrusted with the direction of the Jesuit seminary thof Rome. Later in his life he was assigned to Florence and Loreto, before returning to Rome, where he died on April 6, 1599.

== Works ==
Torsellino wrote several historical works, including a life of the founder-member of the Society of Jesus, Francis Xavier. Among his best known works are:

- De vita San Francisci Xaverii libri VI. Rome: Luigi Zanetti. 1596.
- De particulis Latinae orationis. Rome: Luigi Zanetti. 1598.
- Epitome historiarum a mundo condito ad ann. 1598 (Rome, in quarto; best editions are those which have a continuation by Philippus Brietius, 1618-61)

Torsellino's Epitome Historiarum (1598) is considered the Catholic counterpart to Johann Carion's Chronicles. It became the most widely-read Catholic history textbook of the 17th century, circulating in many European countries well into the 18th century, in some 135 editions and translations. His treatise on Latin particles De particulis Latinae orationis, first published in Rome in 1598, is a landmark in the history of Latin scholarship and was reissued several times. Of particular iportance is the elaborate edition by Ferdinand Gotthelf Hand, published three centuries after the birth of the author (Tursellinus, seu de particulis Latinis commentarii, 1829–1845).

== Bibliography ==
- This article incorporates public domain material from McClintock, John; Strong, James (1867–1887). Cyclopædia of Biblical, Theological and Ecclesiastical Literature. Harper and Brothers.
- Sowerby, E.M. (1952). Catalogue of the Library of Thomas Jefferson. Vol. 1. Washington, D.C.: The Library of Congress. p. 22.
