= Ecclesiastical separatism =

Withdrawal from Christian denominations

Ecclesiastical separatism is the withdrawal of people and churches from Christian denominations, usually to form new denominations.

== History ==
The historical development of major church branches from their roots

In the 16th and 17th centuries, the separating puritans advocated departure from the Church of England. These people became known as dissenters.

Ecclesiastical separatism has also been associated with Christian fundamentalism (at times other forms of theological conservatism), and such withdrawals have been mainly due to (perceived) theological liberalism within the established state churches, national churches, and mainline Protestant denominations. They have often been accompanied by a refusal to have any further association with the parent denomination/Christian fellowship with its members, or denominations cutting ties of full communion or altar and pulpit fellowship with other denominations. George Marsden notes that Arno C. Gaebelein was one of the early fundamentalist leaders to advocate ecclesiastical separation in a conference address in 1914. Gaebelein had left the Methodist Episcopal Church in 1899. For Carl McIntire in the 1930s and 1940s, separation meant leaving liberal denominations (he formed the Bible Presbyterian Church) as well as organizations such as the National Council of Churches (he formed the rival American Council of Christian Churches). McIntire also separated from evangelical groups, such as the National Association of Evangelicals, which he believed had compromised with the liberalism of the National Council of Churches.

In fundamentalism, ecclesiastical separatism is closely connected with the doctrine of separation, in which Christians are urged to be personally separate from the world. This is often based on 2 Corinthians 6:17: "Wherefore come out from among them, and be ye separate, saith the Lord, and touch not the unclean thing; and I will receive you." Dennis Costella bases his ideas of separation on God's holiness, and argues that this requires not just "withdrawal from counterfeit, apostate Christianity", but also "separation from disobedient brethren". The "refusal to associate with groups who endorse questionable doctrinal beliefs or moral practices" is known as "first-degree separation", while "second-degree separation" means "refraining from association or identification with groups or individuals who do not practice first-degree separation".

Many separatist denominations and groups still exist today. For example, the Biblical Graduate School of Theology affirms belief "in the principle of biblical separation which calls the individual and the church to holiness, being separated to God and from the world". Its statement of faith goes on to say that "ecclesiastical separation involves rejecting any fellowship with organizations which deny the cardinal truths of Scripture in word or deed".

Peter Masters laments that "biblical Separation from denominational heresy and apostasy (nowadays including homosexual immorality) is no longer widely followed by evangelicals." He argues that this has "led to a weakened, worldly, psychological evangelicalism in Britain". Masters' congregation, the Metropolitan Tabernacle in London, separated from the Baptist Union of Great Britain in 1971.

== Sources ==
- Meyendorff, John (1989). Imperial unity and Christian divisions: The Church 450-680 A.D. The Church in history. Vol. 2. Crestwood, NY: St. Vladimir's Seminary Press. ISBN 9780881410563.
