= R. Laird Harris =

American theologian and academic (1911 – 2008)

Robert Laird Harris
- Born: March 10, 1911; Upper Makefield Township, Pennsylvania
- Died: April 25, 2008 (aged 97)
- Occupations: Presbyterian minister, church leader, and Old Testament scholar
- Spouse(s): Elizabeth K. Nelson, then Anne P. Krauss

Academic background
- Education: University of Delaware (BS); Westminster Theological Seminary (ThB, ThM); University of Pennsylvania (MA); Dropsie College (PhD)
- Thesis: (1947)

Robert Laird Harris (March 10, 1911 – April 25, 2008) was a Presbyterian minister, church leader, and Old Testament scholar.

== Biography ==
Harris was born near Upper Makefield Township, Pennsylvania. He was son of Rev. Walter B.Harris, a Presbyterian minister with a Princeton degree who married Pearl Graves. Known as R. Laird or just Laird, he had an older sister Dr. Bethel Fleming, who became a pioneer physician in Nepal. Her story is told in The Fabulous Flemings of Kathmandu, by Grace Nies Fletcher (E. P. Dutton, N.Y.1964). He earned a B.S. from the University of Delaware (1931), a Th.B. (1935) and a Th.M. (1937) from Westminster Theological Seminary, an A.M. from University of Pennsylvania (1941), and a Ph.D. from Dropsie College (1947).

He was licensed as a minister in the Presbyterian Church in the United States of America in 1935, joined the newly formed Orthodox Presbyterian Church in 1936, then teamed up with those forming the Bible Presbyterian Church in 1937. In 1956, he became moderator of a new offshoot denomination, the Bible Presbyterian Synod (BPS), later to become the Evangelical Presbyterian Church. He was involved on the committee that brought about the merger of the EPC with another denomination to become the Reformed Presbyterian Church, Evangelical Synod (RPCES) in 1965, and then the RPCES, along with its education institutions Covenant College and Covenant Theological Seminary, became part of the Presbyterian Church in America in 1982, at which time Harris was elected moderator of the 10th General Assembly of that body.

He was part-time instructor in Hebrew at the University of Pennsylvania (1946–1947) and then taught for twenty years at Faith Theological Seminary (1937–1956). He resigned from that institution because of his belief in the propriety of denomination-controlled institutions, and he then helped found the Covenant Theological Seminary, which was a denominational institution and where he was chairman of the Old Testament department until he retired in 1981. Harris served as Professor of Old Testament (and later adjunct professor) at Knox Theological Seminary at its founding in 1989. He was actively involved with the development of the Old Testament department there, teaching Hebrew, Hebrew Exegesis, the Pentateuch, and Survey through 1993.

Harris's first wife, Elizabeth K. Nelson, was born on April 30, 1910, and died in 1980. He then married Anne P. Krauss and lived in Quarryville, Pennsylvania.

== Publications ==
Harris published several books including Introductory Hebrew Grammar, Inspiration and Canonicity of the Bible, Your Bible, and Man—God's Eternal Creation

He also served as editor of The Theological Wordbook of the Old Testament and was a contributing editor to the Zondervan Pictorial Encyclopedia of the Bible. He was contributed articles to the Wycliffe Bible Commentary and the Expositor's Bible, and he served as chairman of the Committee on Bible Translation for the New International Version.

== Works ==
=== Books ===
- Harris, R. Laird (1949). Fundamental Protestant Doctrines. Wilmington, DE: Bible Presbyterian Press. OCLC 30412899. - in 5 volumes
- ——— (1950). Introductory Hebrew Grammar. Grand Rapids, MI: Eerdmans. OCLC 8797155.
- ——— (1969). Inspiration and Canonicity of the Bible: an historical and exegetical study. Contemporary Evangelical Perspectives. Grand Rapids, MI: Zondervan. OCLC 259213.
- ——— (1971). Man — God's Eternal Creation: Old Testament teaching on man and his culture. Chicago, IL: Moody Press. OCLC 135063.
- ———; Archer, Gleason L.; Waltke, Bruce K., eds. (1980). Theological Wordbook of the Old Testament. Chicago, IL: Moody Press. ISBN 978-0-8024-8631-8. OCLC 7172186. - in 2 volumes
- ———; Quek, Swee-Hwa; Vannoy, J. Robert, eds. (1986). Interpretation & History: essays in honour of Allan A. MacRae. Singapore: Christian Life Publishers. ISBN 978-9971-9911-4-2. OCLC 14167631.
- ——— (1990). You & Your Bible: an introduction to the Word. Wheaton, IL: Evangelical Training Association. ISBN 978-0-910566-12-4. OCLC 31596117.
- ———; Cotton, Roger D. (1995). Lint, Gregory A. (ed.). The Old Testament Study Bible: Leviticus - Numbers. Complete Biblical Library: The Old Testament. Vol. 3. Springfield, MO: World Library Press. ISBN 978-1-884642-27-2. OCLC 34181429.
- ——— (1995). The Beatitudes in the Gospels and in the Gospel of Thomas. Evangelical Theological Society papers. Vol. ETS-0563. Evangelical Theological Society. OCLC 33116099.
- ——— (1996). Form of the Quotations of the OT in the Book of Hebrews. Evangelical Theological Society papers. Vol. ETS-0576. Evangelical Theological Society. OCLC 35708150.
- ——— (1997). The Origin of Luke's Religion. Evangelical Theological Society papers. Vol. ETS-0588. Evangelical Theological Society. OCLC 37314261.
- ——— (2002). Exploring the Basics of the Bible. Wheaton, IL: Crossway Books. ISBN 978-1-58134-370-0. OCLC 48098329.

=== Chapters ===
- ——— (1986). "Prophecy, Illustration and Typology". In ———; Quek, Swee-Hwa; Vannoy, J. Robert (eds.). Interpretation & History: essays in honour of Allan A. MacRae. Singapore: Christian Life Publishers. ISBN 978-9971-9911-4-2. OCLC 14167631.

=== Articles ===
- ——— (April 1961). "Exegetical Notes: Meaning of Kipper". Bulletin of the Evangelical Theological Society. 4 (1).
- ——— (Dec 1961). "The Meaning of the Word Sheol as Shown by Parallels in Poetic Texts". Bulletin of the Evangelical Theological Society. 4 (4): 129–135.
- ——— (Fall 1963). "Barth and Eschatology". Bulletin of the Evangelical Theological Society. 6 (4): 114–123.
- ——— (Fall 1966). "Was the law and the prophets two-thirds of the Old Testament canon". Bulletin of the Evangelical Theological Society. 9 (4): 163–171.
- ——— (Winter 1966). "The Basis For Our Belief in Inerrancy". Bulletin of the Evangelical Theological Society. 9 (1): 13–18.
- ——— (Winter 1967). "Factors promoting the formation of the Old Testament canon". Bulletin of the Evangelical Theological Society. 10 (1): 21–27.
- ——— (Fall 1968). "The mist, the canopy, and the rivers of Eden". Bulletin of the Evangelical Theological Society. 11 (4): 177–179.
- ———. "The Doctrine of Revelation and Inspiration in the Old Testament". Grace Journal. 6 (1): 16–.
- ——— (March 1962). "The Bible and Cosmology". Bulletin of the Evangelical Theological Society. 5 (1): 11–17.
