= The Gay Lord Quex =

The Gay Lord Quex may refer to:

- The Gay Lord Quex (play), an 1899 play by Arthur Wing Pinero
- The Gay Lord Quex (1917 film), a British silent film adaptation directed by Maurice Elvey
- The Gay Lord Quex (1919 film), an American silent film adaptation directed by Harry Beaumont
