= Groote Kerk =

Groote Kerk may refer to:

- Groote Kerk, Galle, (built 1750), a Dutch Reformed church in Galle, Sri Lanka
- Groote Kerk, Haarlem, (built 1479, became a cathedral 1559), a Protestant church and former Catholic cathedral in Haarlem, Netherlands
- Groote Kerk, Cape Town (built 1841), a Dutch Reformed church in Cape Town, South Africa

== See also ==
- Grote Kerk (disambiguation)
