= Johnny Quick =

Johnny Quick may refer to:

- Johnny Quick (Crime Syndicate)
- Johnny Quick (Johnny Chambers)

== See also ==
- Jonathan Quick, hockey player
