= Nieuwe Kerk =

Nieuwe Kerk (English: New Church) is a common name for churches in the Netherlands. It may refer to:

- Nieuwe Kerk (Amsterdam)
- Nieuwe Kerk (Delft)
- Nieuwe Kerk, Groningen
- Nieuwe Kerk (Katwijk aan Zee)
- Nieuwe Kerk (The Hague)
- Nieuwe Kerk, Haarlem

== See also ==
There are some Dutch towns with similar name, for instance:

- Nieuwerkerk, in Zeeland
- Nieuwerkerke, a hamlet near Nieuwerkerk
- Nieuwerkerk aan den IJssel, in South Holland
