= John Quick =

John Quick is the name of:

- John Quick (divine) (1636–1706), English nonconformist divine
- John Quick (actor) (1748–1831), English actor
- Sir John Quick (politician) (1852–1932), Australian politician and author
- John H. Quick (1870–1922), sergeant in the U.S. Marine Corps during the Spanish–American War
- John Herbert Quick (1861–1925), American writer
- Johnny Quick (Crime Syndicate), DC Comics character
- Johnny Quick (Johnny Chambers), DC Comics character

== See also ==
- Jonathan Quick (born 1986), ice hockey player
