= Gustav Queck =

German educator and classical philologist

Gustav Adolf Queck (18 March 1822, Zadelsdorf – 1897, Treptow an der Rega) was a German educator and classical philologist.

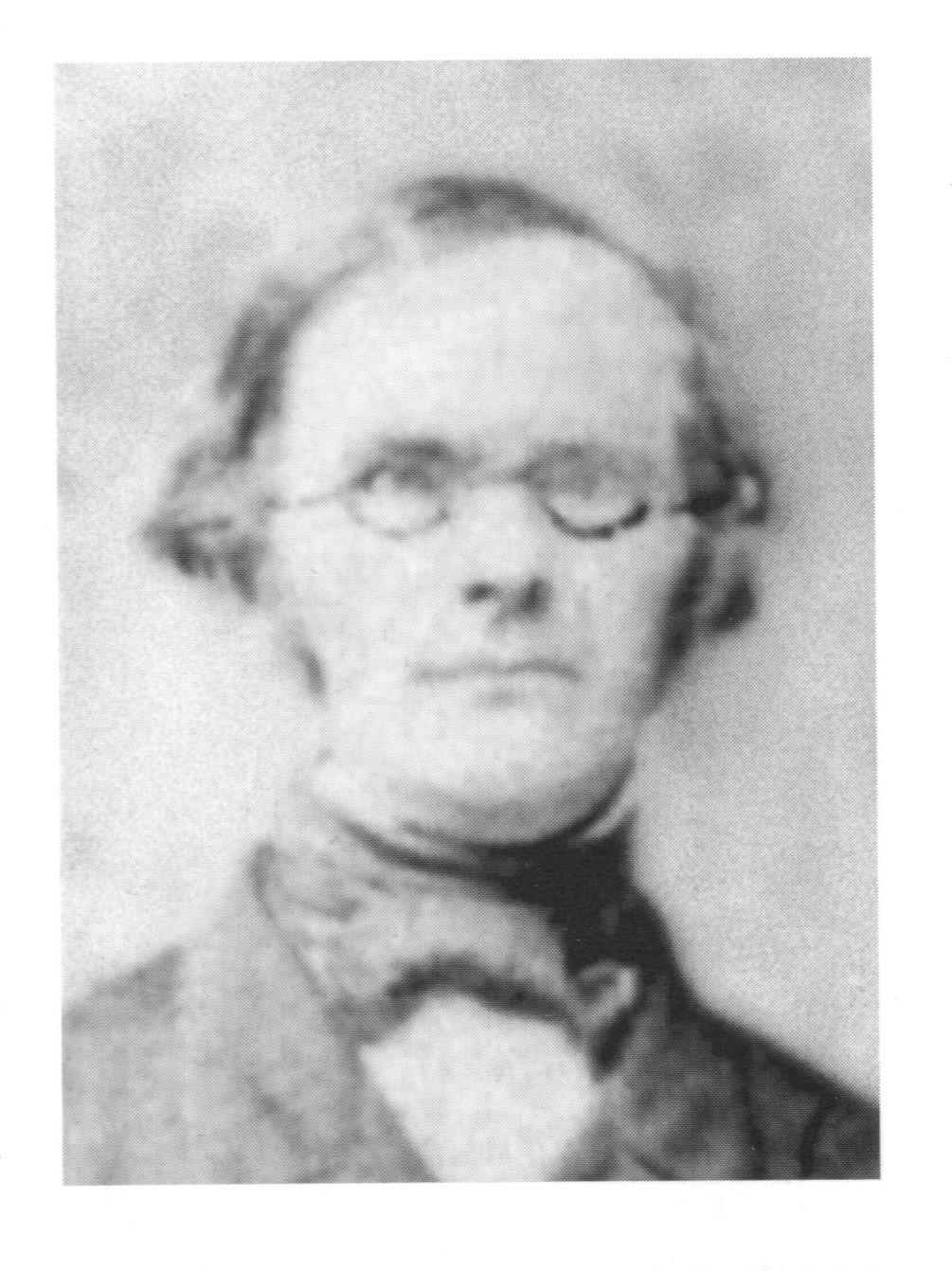
Gustav Queck

From 1841 to 1845 he studied philology at the University of Jena. Following graduation he worked as a schoolteacher in Sondershausen, where in 1853 he received the title of professor. In 1866 he became a school prorector in Pyritz, and during the following year was named director of the newly founded gymnasium in Dramburg.

== Published works ==
- De Euripidis Electra, 1844 – Euripides' Electra.
- Beiträge zur Charakteristik des Livius, 1847 – Contribution to the characteristics of Livy.
- Ferdinand Gotthelf Hand nach seinem Leben und Wirken, 1852 – Biography of Ferdinand Gotthelf Hand.
- C. Julii Caesaris Commentariorum de bello civili libri tres, 1853 – edition of Julius Caesar's "Commentarii de Bello Civili", book III.
- Zweiter Beitrag zur Charakteristik des Livius, 1853 – Second contribution to the characteristics of Livy.
- Publius Papinius Statius (two volumes), 1854 – edition of Statius (Silvae, Achilleis, Thebais).
- De Madvigii emendationibus Livianis disp. Lib. I-III., 1861.
