= Thomas Quick =

Thomas Quick may refer to:

- William Thomas Quick (born 1946), American conservative blogger, novelist and ghostwriter
- Thomas Rory Quick, apprentice pharmacist in the BBC television series Victorian Pharmacy
- Thomas Quick (Illinois politician), 19th century Illinois state representative
- Sture Bergwall (born 1950), also known as Thomas Quick, Swedish psychiatric patient, wrongly convicted of eight murders, later acquitted

== See also ==
- Tommy Quick, Swedish archer
- George B. Wooldridge, business manager of a blackface minstrel troupe, sometimes went by the name Tom Quick
