= Grote Kerk =

Grote Kerk may refer to:

- Grote Kerk, De Rijp, a Protestant church in De Rijp, Netherlands
- Grote Kerk, Dordrecht, a Protestant church in Dordrecht, Netherlands
- Grote Kerk, Haarlem, a Protestant church and former Catholic cathedral in Haarlem, Netherlands
- Grote Kerk (Breda), a monument and a landmark of Breda, Netherlands
- Grote or Sint-Jacobskerk (The Hague), a Protestant church in The Hague, The Netherlands
- Grote or Sint-Laurenskerk (Rotterdam), a Protestant church and landmark of Rotterdam

== See also ==
- Groote Kerk (disambiguation)
