= Quek Swee Hwa =

Singaporean pastor and theologian (born 1941)

Quek Swee Hwa 郭瑞华
- Born: Quek Swee Hwa; 15 June 1941; Singapore
- Education: BA Shelton College; BD, Faith Theological Seminary; MA, University of Pennsylvania; PhD, University of Manchester
- Occupation: Pastor
- Years active: 1970-present
- Spouse: Esther Cheng
- Religion: Christianity - Bible-Presbyterian
- Ordained: 31 October 1970

Quek Swee Hwa (born 15 June 1941) is a Singaporean pastor and theologian. He was the founding principal of the Biblical Graduate School of Theology. He served as the General Secretary of the International Council of Christian Churches (ICCC), succeeding his father Quek Kiok Chiang in the office. He went on to become the Second Vice President of the ICCC until its 21st World Congress in June 2023 but remains as a member of its Executive Committee.

== Education ==
Quek studied at Shelton College, Faith Theological Seminary, and the University of Pennsylvania. He received a PhD from the University of Manchester. Working under the supervision of F. F. Bruce, his thesis was Adam and Christ: An Exegetical Study of the Pauline Analogy in the Light of the History of Interpretation (1970).

== Doctrine ==
According to an article published in The Burning Bush, Quek has questioned the literalness of the "years" of Genesis and the universality of the Genesis Flood.

== Ministry ==
In 1970, Quek was ordained as a minister in the Bible-Presbyterian Church, and installed as pastor of Zion Bible-Presbyterian Church in Serangoon Gardens, succeeding his father in this role. In 1989 he became founding principal of the Biblical Graduate School of Theology. He served as principal until 2011, when he was succeeded by Philip Satterthwaite. He continues to serve as Pastor Emeritus of Zion Bishan Bible-Presbyterian Church.

Quek also leads groups on Bible Land tours.

== Festschrift ==
Quek has been honoured with two Festschriften: Serve the Lord with Gladness: Essays on the Life and Mission of the Church in Honour of Quek Swee Hwa (1991) and The Joy of the Lord: Essays in Honour of Quek Swee Hwa On His 70th Birthday (2012).

Academic offices
| Preceded by New Office | Principal of the Biblical Graduate School of Theology; 1989-2011 | Succeeded by Philip Satterthwaite |

Conciliar offices
| Preceded by Quek Kiok Chiang | General Secretary of the International Council of Christian Churches; 2005 – present | Succeeded by Incumbent |
