= Biblical Graduate School of Theology =

BGST partners churches to equip effective ambassadors for Christ in their marketplaces

- Motto in English: Equipping Ambassadors for Christ in their Marketplaces
- Established: 1989
- Principal: Lai Pak Wah
- Location: Singapore, Singapore; 1.328°N 103.879°E
- Website: www.bgst.edu.sg

Biblical Graduate School of Theology (BGST) is an evangelical theological seminary in Singapore that partners churches to equip marketplace Christians so that they become effective ambassadors for Christ in their workplaces. The current principal is Lai Pak Wah.

== History and doctrine ==
Biblical Graduate School of Theology (BGST) was established in 1989. The founding principal was Quek Swee Hwa, who was succeeded in 2011 by Dr Philip Satterthwaite.

BGST was formed after the dissolution of the Bible Presbyterian (B-P) Denomination in Singapore. Two B-P churches, Zion B-P Church and Mt Carmel B-P Church, founded the school to become the equivalent of an 'Open University' for training marketplace Christians. The founder, Quek Swee Hwa, was the senior pastor of Zion Serangoon Bible-Presbyterian Church and the institution was located at Zion Bishan Bible-Presbyterian Church from 1994 to 2004.

Since then, BGST has become a trans-denominational college with students from Anglican, Methodist, Brethren, Pentecostal, Evangelical Free, Presbyterian, Lutheran, Baptist and other independent churches. What the majority of students share in common is that they work in different marketplaces - from banking, teaching, civil service, pastoral ministries, missions to technology, medical and manufacturing.

While its initial theological position was more Bible Presbyterian, the school has, since 2022, broadened its Theological Position to reflect a mainstream evangelical position, including affirmations of the Nicene and Apostles Creeds. BGST’s board and faculty reflect its theological ethos with representation from Anglican, Methodist, Pentecostal, Evangelical Free and Bible-Presbyterian.

In 2024, BGST announced that it would transform itself to become More than a Seminary, That is, to partner churches in the equipping of marketplace Christians. To this end, it restructured itself into four centres of learning: the Centre for Postgraduate Studies (CPS), the Centre for Christian Leadership (CCL), the Centre for Spiritual Formation (CSF) and the Centre for Equipping and Discipleship (CED). This is to provide a wider range of right sized training catering to the needs of churches and marketplace Christians.

The school now offers a wide range of training from postgraduate studies, Christian leadership training, Spiritual Direction to microlearning courses. Most of its classes are hybrid, that is a mixture of zoom and in person training. The topics covered in its conferences and public lectures include Digital Theology, Creation Care, Aging, Marketplace Issues, Sexuality, Biblical Archaeology and Leadership.

== Accreditation ==
Biblical Graduate School of Theology is accredited by the Asia Theological Association to offer Graduate Diploma in Christian Studies, Master of Arts in Theology and Integrative Studies (formerly known as Masters Christian Studies), and Master of Divinity degrees. The school also offers 4 Graduate Certificates in Biblical Studies, Theological Studies, Spiritual Formation and Missions Studies. The credits of these Graduate Certificates are stackable and transferable to the above accredited degrees.

According to Brian Stiller, BGST has followed Regent College's vision of "giving the same theological integration to people undertaking societal careers as is normally given to people preparing for a Christian service career." BGST and Regent College have an established agreement on the transfer of BGST credits to Regent.

As of 2009, 80% of BGST graduates were Singaporean. 56% of graduates were lay people who returned to their lay professions; 22% went into pastoral ministry; and 22% went into theological education and missions.
