= Kerk (surname) =

- Language: Chinese, Dutch, English, German, Sorbian

Origin
- Meaning: Chinese: "city walls"; Dutch, English, German: "church"; Sorbian: "bush", "shrub"

Other names
- Variant forms: English: Kirk, Kirke, Kyrke, Kirt, Kurk; Chinese: Guo, Kek, Kuek, Kwek

Kerk is a Chinese, Dutch, English, German, and Sorbian surname.

== Origins ==
As an English surname, Kerk is a variant spelling of Kirk, which originated from the Middle English word kirk 'church' as a locative surname for someone who lived by a church. Early records of people using the spelling Kerk for this surname include a Susanne Kerk (fl. 1576) of Bourne, Lincolnshire, in the International Genealogical Index of the Church of Jesus Christ of Latter-day Saints. The Dutch and German surname, with the same meaning, originated from Middle Dutch kerk and Middle Low German kerke or karke respectively, while the Sorbian surname means 'bush' or 'shrub'. The surname Kerk is also found in Southeast Asia among Overseas Chinese communities in Malaysia and in Singapore as a spelling of the Hokkien pronunciation of the Chinese surname read Guō in Mandarin (郭).

== Statistics ==
According to statistics compiled by Patrick Hanks on the basis of the 2011 United Kingdom census and the Census of Ireland 2011, 14 people on the island of Great Britain and none on the island of Ireland bore the surname Kerk as of 2011. In the 1881 United Kingdom census there had been 24 people with the surname Kerk, primarily in London. The 2010 United States census found 114 people with the surname Kerk, making it the 145,220th-most-common name in the country. This represented a decrease from 136 people (118,236th most-common) in the 2000 Census. In both censuses, about seven-tenths of the bearers of the surname identified as non-Hispanic white, and about ten percent as non-Hispanic Asian or Pacific Islander.

== People ==
Notable people with this surname include:

- Kerk Chee Yee (郭子毅; born 1992), Malaysian politician, member of the Malacca State Legislative Assembly
- Kerk Choo Ting (郭洙鎮; 1941–2018), Malaysian politician, MP for Taiping
- Gyrano Kerk (born 1995), Dutch footballer
- Kerk Kim Hock (郭金福; 1956–2017), Malaysian politician, MP for Kota Melaka
- Sebastian Kerk (born 1994), German footballer

== See also ==
- Kerr (surname)
