= Robert Bell =

Robert or Rob Bell may refer to:

== Arts and entertainment ==
- Robert Charles Bell (engraver) (1806–1872), Scottish engraver
- Robert Anning Bell (1863–1933), English artist and designer
- Robert Bell (artist and curator) (1946–2018), Australian artist and curator
- Robert "Kool" Bell (born 1950), American singer, songwriter, and bassist with Kool & the Gang
- Robert Bell, musician and bassist with The Blue Nile
- Rob Bell (TV presenter) (born 1979), British TV presenter

== Authors and editors ==
- Robert Bell (writer) (1800–1867), Irish journalist & editor
- Robert Charles Bell (1917–2002), author of several books on board games
- Rob Bell (Robert Holmes Bell Jr., born 1970), American author, Christian speaker and pastor

== Law ==
- Robert C. Bell (1880–1964), U.S. federal judge
- Robert M. Bell (born 1943), chief judge of the Maryland Court of Appeals
- Robert Holmes Bell (1944–2023), U.S. federal judge
- Robert D. Bell (born 1967), justice of the Oklahoma Court of Civil Appeals

== Politics ==
- Robert Bell (speaker) (died 1577), British statesman
- Robert Bell (died 1639) (1589–1639), English landowner and politician
- Robert Bell (Lanark County politician) (1808–1894), Canadian legislator
- Robert Bell (Ottawa politician) (1821–1873), Canadian legislator
- Robert Bell (Toronto politician) (1827–1883), Orangeman and legislator in Ontario, Canada
- Robert Duncan Bell (1878–1953), acting governor of Bombay during the British Raj, 1937
- Robert Bell (Minnesota politician) (1926–2014), Minnesota politician
- Robert Bell (Australian politician) (1950–2001), Australian politician
- Chris Bell (politician) (Robert Christopher Bell, born 1959), U.S. representative from Texas
- Rob Bell (Virginia politician) (born 1967), member of the Virginia House of Delegates
- Robert F. Bell, member of the Illinois House of Representatives

== Science ==
- Robert Bell (Canadian geologist) (1841–1917), Canadian geologist
- Robert Bell (Irish geologist) (1864–1934), Northern Irish amateur geologist
- Robert E. Bell (1914–2006), American archaeologist
- Robert Edward Bell (1918–1992), Canadian nuclear physicist and principal of McGill University
- Robert James Bell (born 1975), known as Dr Rob, scientist, and host of Australian children's television programme Scope

== Sports ==
- Robert William Bell (1875–1950), England international rugby player
- Bunny Bell (Robert Bell, 1911–1988), English footballer who played for Tranmere Rovers and Everton
- Bobby Bell (Scottish footballer) (Robert McDicken Bell, 1934–2007), association football player for various English and Scottish clubs
- Rob Bell (baseball) (Robert Allen Bell, born 1977), American baseball player
- Rob Bell (racing driver) (born 1979), British racing driver

== Others ==
- Robert Bell (publisher) (1732–1784), American printer and publisher
- Robert Bell (priest) (1808–1883), archdeacon of Cashel
- Robert Bell (physician) (1845–1926), English physician and medical writer
- Robert Fitzroy Bell (1859–1908), Scottish publisher and founder of the Edinburgh students' representative council
- Robert J. T. Bell (1876–1963), Scottish mathematician
- Robert Huntley Bell (born 1946), American academic
- Robert P. Bell (1918–1992), president of Ball State University

== See also ==
- Bob Bell (disambiguation)
