= Edward Mitchell =

Edward Mitchell may refer to:

- Edward Page Mitchell (1852–1927), American writer
- Edward Mitchell (Irish politician) (1859–1921), member of parliament for North Fermanagh, 1903–1906
- Edward Fancourt Mitchell (1855–1941), Australian lawyer
- Edward Mitchell (Scottish politician) (1879–1965), British member of parliament for Paisley, 1924–1929
- Edward Mitchell (pianist) (1891–1950), British pianist and composer known for his interpretations of Russian music
- Edward Mitchell (footballer) (1892–1916), English footballer
- Edward Mitchell (New York politician) (1842–1909), American lawyer and politician from New York
- Edward Mitchell (Illinois politician), member of the Illinois House of Representatives.
- Edward H. Mitchell (1867–1932), American businessman and postcard publisher
- Ed Mitchell (rower) (1901–1970), American rower
- E. A. Mitchell (Edward Archibald Mitchell, 1910–1979), U.S. representative from Indiana, military leader and businessman
- Ed Mitchell (Edward Frederick Mitchell, born 1953), British former television presenter and news reader

== See also ==
- Eddy Mitchell (born 1942), French singer and actor
- Ted Mitchell (disambiguation)
