= Bob Bell =

Bob or Bobby Bell may refer to:

== Sports ==
- Bob Bell (motorsport) (born 1958), British Formula One technical director
- Bob Bell (American football) (born 1948), American football defensive end
- Bobby Bell (linebacker, born 1962), American football player
- Bobby Bell (born 1940), American football player
- Bobby Bell (English footballer) (born 1950), English footballer
- Bobby Bell (Scottish footballer) (1934–2007), Scottish footballer
- Bob Bell (Australian footballer) (1953–2010), Australian rules footballer

== Others ==
- Bob Bell (actor) (1922–1997), American actor
- Bob Bell (art director) (1918–2009), British art director
- Bob Bell (insurance), British insurance magnate, campaigner of the Maxi yachts Condor and Condor of Bermuda in the 1970s & 80s
- Bob Bell (politician) (1929–2011), New Zealand politician
- Bob Bell (sculptor), Choctaw sculptor and "Master Artist" of the Five Civilized Tribes Museum

== See also ==
- Rob Bell (born 1970), Christian author
- Robert Bell (disambiguation)
