= Peter Green =

Peter Green(e) may refer to:

== Musicians ==
- Peter Green (musician) (1946–2020), English guitarist, founder of Fleetwood Mac
- Daniel Boone (singer) (born Peter Charles Green; 1942–2023), British singer

== Sports ==
- Peter Green (footballer) (born 1974), Australian rules footballer
- Peter Green (referee) (born 1978), Australian association football referee
- Peter Green (rower) (1920–2011), Canadian rower
- Pete Green (baseball) (1891–1961), American Negro leagues baseball player
- Pete Green (ice hockey) (1868–1934), Canadian ice hockey coach

== Other people ==
- Peter Green (dog handler) (fl. 1960s–2010s), dog show handler and judge
- Peter Green (historian) (1924–2024), British historian and translator
- Peter Green (physician) (born 1947), Australian-born gastroenterologist
- Peter Green (statistician) (born 1950), English statistician
- Peter F. Green, American materials scientist
- Peter Shaw Green (1920–2009), English botanist
- Peter Greene (born Green; 1965–2025), American actor
- Peter Greene (Irish politician) (1895–1963), mayor of Galway
- Peter Greene (Illinois politician), member of the Illinois House of Representatives
- Petey Greene (1931–1984), American talk show host

== Other uses ==
- Peter Green (shop) (1916–1980), a British furniture retailer founder
