= Benjamin Brown =

Benjamin Brown may refer to:

- Benjamin Brown (actor) (born 1968), American actor noted for starring in the Disney series Omba Mokomba and Safari Tracks as tour guide Ushaka
- Benjamin Brown (artist) (1865–1942), American landscape artist
- Benjamin Brown (politician) (1756–1831), member of the 14th United States Congress
- Benjamin Brown (developer) (1885–1939), developer of rural communities in New Jersey
- Benjamin Brown (Medal of Honor) (1859–1910), American Indian Wars soldier
- Benny Brown (1953–1996), American sprinter
- Benny Brown (baseball) (fl. 1932), baseball shortstop in the Negro leagues
- B. Gratz Brown (1826–1885), American politician
- Benjamin Brown (architect) (1890–1974), Canadian architect
- Benjamin Brown (scholar) (born 1966), Jewish studies scholar
- Benjamin Brown (activist) (1945–1967), African-American student at Jackson State University active in the civil rights movement, killed on campus
- Benjamin D. Brown (Georgia politician) (1939–1999), member of the Georgia House of Representatives
- Benjamin D. Brown (Illinois politician), member of the Illinois House of Representatives

== See also ==
- Ben Brown (disambiguation)
