= Jacob Feaman =

American politician

Member of the Illinois Senate
- In office 1840–1844

Jacob Feaman was an American politician who served as a member of the Illinois Senate.

He served as a state senator representing Randolph County in the 12th and the 13th Illinois General Assemblies.
