= Bishop Mahlon =

American politician

Member of the Illinois House of Representatives
- In office 1842–1844

Bishop Mahlon was an American politician who served as a member of the Illinois House of Representatives.

He served as a state representative representing McLean County in the 13th Illinois General Assembly.
