= James Norris =

James, Jim, or Jimmy Norris may refer to:

== Law and politics ==
- James Norris (lawyer) (c. 1774–1838), English magistrate
- James S. Norris (1810–1874), American politician in Minnesota
- James Norris (Illinois politician) (fl. 1842), American politician in Illinois
- James Norris (Canadian politician) (1820–1891), Canadian politician
- James T. Norris (1861–1942), American politician in Maryland

== Sports ==
- James E. Norris (1879–1952), Canadian-American ice hockey executive
- James D. Norris (1906–1966), American ice hockey executive and boxing promoter
- James Norris (water polo) (1930–2021), American water polo player
- Jim Norris (born 1948), American baseball player
- Jimmy Norris (born 1988), Welsh rugby union player
- James Norris (footballer) (born 2003), English footballer

== Others ==
- James Norris (academic) (1797–1872), English academic administrator
- James Flack Norris (1871–1940), American chemist
- James J. Norris (1907–1976), American humanitarian
- James R. Norris (born 1960), English mathematician

== Other uses ==
- James Norris Memorial Trophy

== See also ==
- James Norris Brewer, English topographer and novelist
