= Senator Pearson (disambiguation) =

James B. Pearson (1920–2009) was a U.S. Senator from Kansas from 1962 to 1978. Senator Pearson may also refer to:

- Albert J. Pearson (1846–1905), Ohio State Senate
- Charles L. Pearson (1860–1918), Wisconsin State Senate
- Chip Pearson (politician) (born 1960), Georgia State Senate
- Christopher Pearson (Vermont politician) (born 1973), Vermont State Senate
- Gardner W. Pearson (1869–1953), Massachusetts State Senate
- H. Clyde Pearson (1925–2010), Virginia State Senate
- Isaac N. Pearson (1842–1908), Illinois State Senate
- J. Richmond Pearson (1930–2014), Alabama State Senate
- John James Pearson (1800–1888), Pennsylvania State Senate
- John Pearson (politician) (1802–1875), Illinois State Senate
- Kirk Pearson (politician) (born 1958), Washington State Senate
- Laura Taliaferro Pearson (fl. 2020s), Wyoming State Senate
- Ryan W. Pearson (born 1988), Rhode Island State Senate

== See also ==
- William B. C. Pearsons (1825–1898), Massachusetts State Senate
