= James N. Brown (Illinois politician) =

American politician

Member of the Illinois House of Representatives
- In office 1852–1854

Member of the Illinois House of Representatives
- In office 1846–1848

Member of the Illinois House of Representatives
- In office 1840–1844

James N. Brown was an American politician who served as a member of the Illinois House of Representatives.

He served as a state representative representing Sangamon County in the 12th 13th, 15th, and 18th Illinois General Assemblies.
