= Andrew McMillan =

Andrew McMillan may refer to:

- Andrew McMillan (swimmer) (born 1985), New Zealand swimmer
- Andrew McMillan (writer) (1957–2012), Australian writer, music journalist and musician
- Andrew McMillan (poet) (born 1988), English poet
- Andrew McMillan (politician), American politician, member of the Illinois House of Representatives

== See also ==
- Andrew McMillen (born c. 1988), Australian journalist
- Andrew Robinson McMillen, Canadian politician
