= Ben Brown =

Ben Brown may refer to:

- Ben Brown (blogger) (born 1978), American blogger, publisher, and website author
- Ben Brown (cricketer) (born 1988), English cricketer
- Ben Brown (journalist) (born 1960), British journalist and news presenter
- Ben Brown (playwright) (fl. 21st century), British playwright
- Ben Brown (footballer) (born 1992), Australian rules footballer
- Ben Brown (musician) (born 1952), American jazz bassist
- Ben Brown (fl. 21st century), ex-bass player for Poison the Well
- Ben H. Brown Jr. (1914–1989), United States ambassador to Liberia
- Ben Brown (baseball) (born 1999), American baseball player
- Ben Brown (politician) (fl. 21st century), Missouri politician
- Ben Brown (writer) (born 1962), New Zealand children's author and poet
- Ben Brown (American football) (born 1998), American football offensive lineman

== See also ==
- Benjamin Brown (disambiguation)
