= James A. James =

American politician

Member of the Illinois Senate
- In office 1840–1844

James A. James was an American politician who served as a member of the Illinois Senate.

He served as a state senator representing Randolph, Madison, and St. Clair counties in the 12th Illinois General Assembly; and Randolph and Monroe counties in the 13th Illinois General Assembly.
