= John Buford (Illinois politician) =

American politician

Member of the Illinois Senate
- In office 1842–1846

Personal details
- Relatives: John Buford (son)

John Buford was an American politician who served as a member of the Illinois Senate.

He served as a state senator representing Rock Island, Henry, Whiteside, and Lee counties in the 13th and the 14th Illinois General Assemblies.
