= Golden Potlatch =

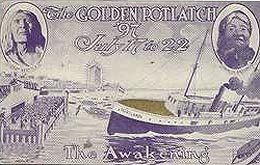
Golden Potlatch card showing images of Chief Seattle and his daughter Princess Angeline.

The Golden Potlatch (or Potlatch Days) was a festival in Seattle, Washington, United States in 1911–1914 and 1934–1941. The idea of an annual Festival in Seattle followed the success of the Alaska–Yukon–Pacific Exposition in 1909. The 'Golden Potlatch' event was conceived to keep Seattle in the public eye. Seattle wanted to have an event that would challenge the Portland Rose Festival and gain national attention. Seattle's Potlatch festival was also a way for a certain class of Seattleites—specifically, the city's new commercial elite—to tell stories about the city and its history. Called a "triumph of symbolism" by one observer, the Potlatch appropriated Native imagery to create a regional vision of civic development.

The name derived from the potlatch, the Chinook Jargon name of a festival ceremony that had been practiced by indigenous peoples of the region; "golden" reflected Seattle's role in the Klondike Gold Rush in the late 1890s.

== First Golden Potlatch, July 17–21, 1911 ==
Golden Potlatch 1911 Kopf pub logo

The first Golden Potlatch took place July 17–21, 1911. It used Klondike Gold Rush imagery, reenacting the 1897 arrival of the steamboat Portland with its legendary "ton of gold". The Portland carried the festival's presiding figure, King D'Oro, avatar of golden wealth, along with a retinue of hoary prospectors and rambunctious dancing girls. Roughly 300,000 people attended parades, concerts, automobile races up Queen Anne Hill, and an airplane piloted by United States Navy Lt. Eugene Ely.

Water events have always been a feature of Golden Potlatch (and later Seattle Seafair) events. The first Golden Potlatch in 1911 had a small United States Navy fleet; the British sent a sloop-of-war. There was even a hydroplane exhibition run by the "Triad" owned by Glenn Curtiss of airplane fame.

In 1911, Robert A. Reid, Seattle, published a number of postcards as part of his Pacific Northwest Photographic Series to publicize the Golden Potlatch. These postcards identified Seattle as a destination available by 'sea, land and rail'.

The Hopf Bros Co. of Seattle published another series of postcards by Edward H. Mitchell. These postcards provide a glimpse of tourist sights such as Mount Rainier and the totem pole at Pioneer Square; commercial aspects of Seattle including Colman Dock and the Grand Trunk Pacific dock; and downtown street views such as First Avenue looking north, Second Avenue looking south from Spring Street, Second Avenue Looking North, Third Avenue looking north, Fourth Avenue looking south and Pike Street looking East.

== Second Golden Potlatch, July 15–20, 1912 ==
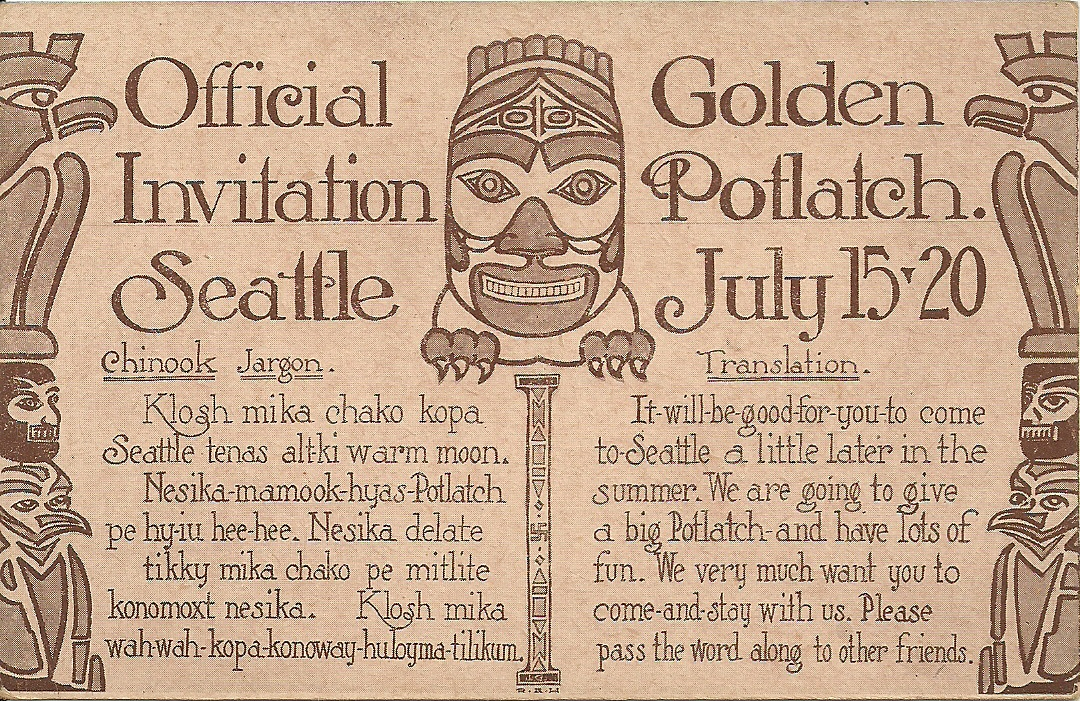
Golden Potlatch, 1912

The second Golden Potlatch was held July 15–20, 1912. Once again postcards were distributed as 'Official Invitation to Seattle's Golden Potlatch'. Other postcards provided views of commercial streets in Seattle. The Klondike image of D’Oro was succeeded by Hyas Tyee Kopa Konoway (the Big Bug). "The Golden Potlatch," was promoted as a 'free' feast spread for the whole world and its brother. On the water, Jean Romano's wingless hydroplane, which looked like a giant spider, thrilled spectators with a 30 M.P.H. exhibition run off Harbor Island.

Capitalizing on Seattle's borrowed Indian heritage, city leaders cranked up the marketing machine to promote their version of Progress. Local boosters called themselves "Tillikums," the word for friends in Chinook Jargon, and led a number of civic celebrations. The Golden Potlatch Parade provided the 'Tillikums' an opportunity to ride in decorated cars and to sponsor themed floats. Many of these are illustrated in Kopf postcards.

== Third Golden Potlatch, July 17–19, 1913 ==
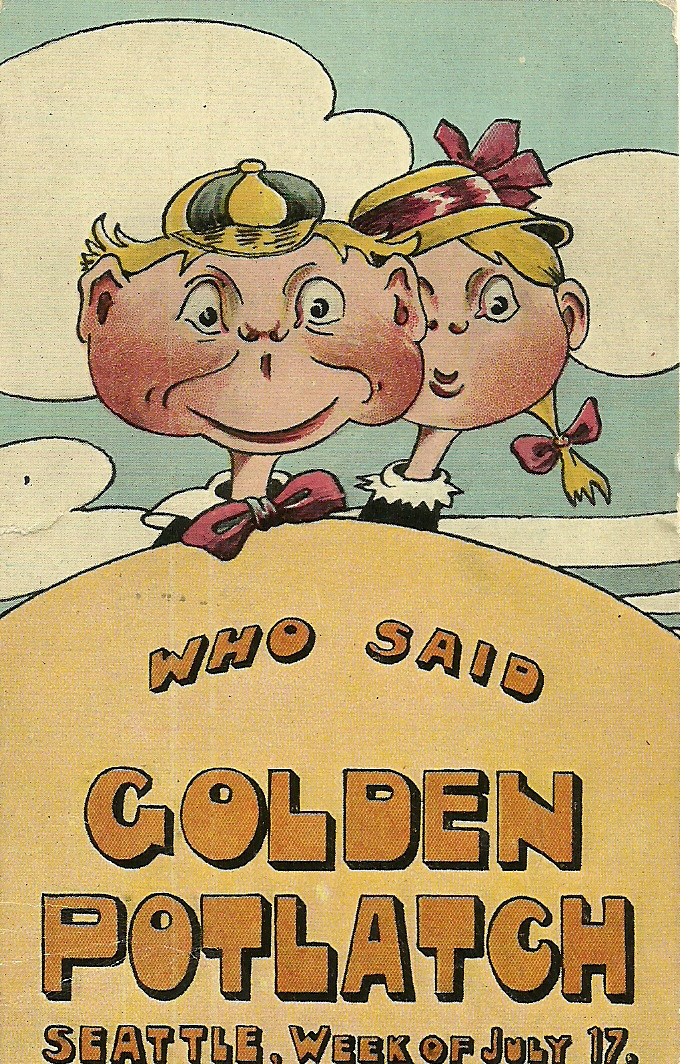
Golden Potlatch, 1913

The 1913 started with high hopes but was marred by the "Potlatch Riots". On the first day of the Potlatch some soldiers and sailors were involved in a fistfight when an IWW Industrial Workers of the World speaker supposedly 'insulted their uniforms'.

A newspaper story the next day further inflamed the situation resulting in soldiers and sailors aided by civilians looting and burning the offices of the IWW and the Socialist Party. A rear admiral in charge of the reserve fleet expressed regret about the outbreak and said he had dispatched a patrol to round up the troublemakers.

On July 19, 1913, Mayor George F. Cotterill, responding to street riots the previous evening during the Potlatch Days festival, declared an emergency, and assumed direct control of the police, closed saloons, banned street speakers, and attempted to temporarily close down The Seattle Times, which he believed provoked the riots.

Despite the unrest on land, the 1913 Golden Potlatch staged three hydroplane races off Madrona Park: a 15-mile race for 16-footers, a 20-mile contest for 26 footers and a 30-mile free for all.

== Tilikum Potlatch 1914 ==
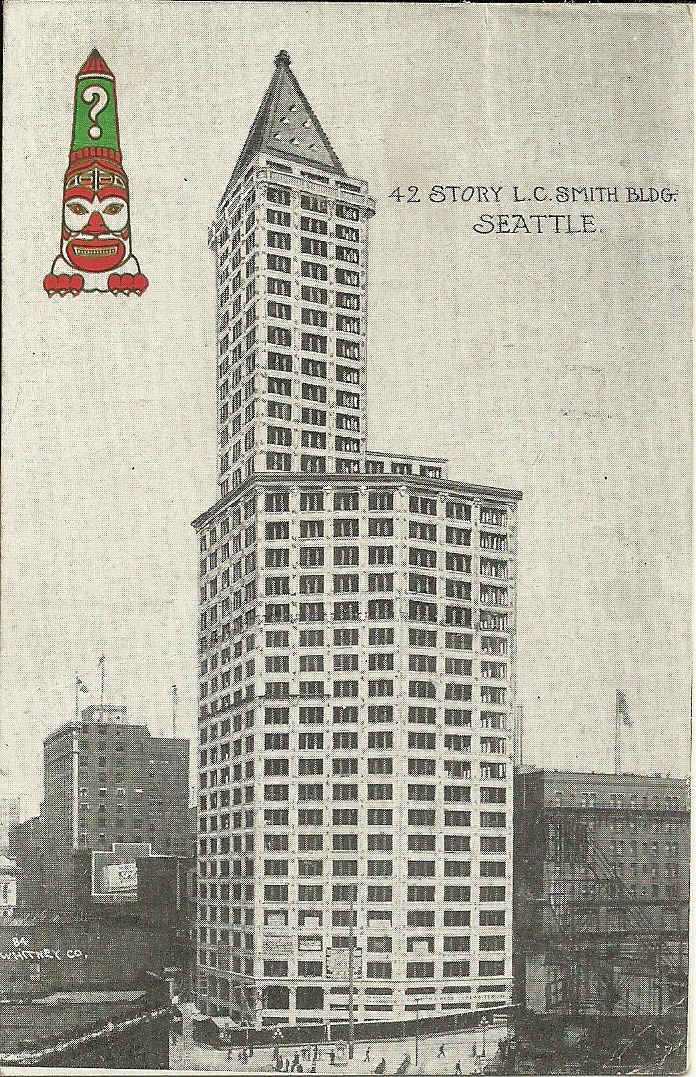
L.C. Smith Tower, Tilikum Potlatch, 1914

The 1914 Potlatch suffered as a result of the previous year's riots. Costs of launching other upcoming festivals, and timing of the fleet visits were also of concern to the Chamber of Commerce. "Tilikum Potlatch" was substituted for the Golden Potlatch name, as it was not produced by the Seattle Carnival Association and the Chamber of Commerce. Instead, it was produced directly by the Tilikums, (note spelling), the independent support participants of previous Golden Potlatches. The Tilikum Potlatch was scaled back to only four days and received only subdued press coverage. It is noteworthy for its Seattle Dads parade, one of many events around the country at this time which helped lead to the institution of Father's Day.

After 1914, the coming of World War I and the lack of support for organizing Potlatch celebrations marked the end of the Potlatch until the mid-1930s.

In 1915, a 'Smile with Nile' national convention was held in Seattle during the week that had been used for Golden Potlatch (July 12–17). The Tilikums and the "Bug" symbol still made a few rare appearances.

== Potlatch Celebrations 1934–1941 ==
The Potlatch festival was revived in 1934. In 1939, the festival celebrated the Washington State Golden Jubilee 1889 - 1939 and was billed as the Seattle Potlatch of Progress and Fleet Week. Unfortunately the Festival was again terminated by war, this time by the U.S. entry into World War II in 1941. Today the annual Seafair Celebrations at the end of July each year continue the golden Potlatch tradition.

== See also ==
- San Diego free speech fight
- Green Corn Rebellion
