= William Hendry (Illinois politician) =

American politician

Member of the Illinois House of Representatives
- In office 1844 – December 30, 1846

Personal details
- Party: Democratic

William Hendry was an American politician who served as a member of the Illinois House of Representatives. After unsuccessfully running as state representative for Adams county in the 13th Illinois General Assembly, he subsequently won election to the 14th Illinois General Assembly and 15th Illinois General Assembly in Adams County. He died while in office on December 30, 1846. Hendry was a Democrat.

His surname is also rendered Henderey.
