= Aaron Jackson =

Aaron Jackson may refer to:

- Aaron Jackson (actor) (born 1973), American actor
- Aaron Jackson (comedian), American comedian and actor
- Aaron Jackson (basketball) (born 1986), American basketball player
- Aaron Jackson (activist), American human rights and environmental activist
- Aaron C. Jackson, member of the Illinois House of Representatives
- Aaron Jackson (American football) in Cincinnati Bengals draft history
