= John Crain =

John Crain may refer to:

- John L. Crain (born 1960), American accountant and academic administrator
- John Crain (Illinois politician) (fl. 1842–1846), 19th century Illinois state senator
