= Charles Ewing =

Charles Ewing may refer to:

- Charles Ewing (general) (1835–1893), attorney and Union Army general during the American Civil War
- Charles Ewing (politician) (1780–1832), American politician and judge from New Jersey
- Charles F. Ewing, American politician, member of the Illinois House of Representatives
- Charles H. Ewing (1866–1935), American railroad executive from Pennsylvania
- Charles Patrick Ewing, forensic psychologist, attorney and professor at the University at Buffalo Law School
