= John McDonald (Illinois politician) =

American politician

Member of the Illinois House of Representatives
- In office 1840–1846

Personal details
- Born: April 1797 Chambersburg, Pennsylvania
- Died: July 1846 (aged 49) Calhoun County, Illinois
- Party: Democratic
- Spouse: Ann Red
- Children: 6

John McDonald (April 1797 – July 1846) was an American politician who served as a member of the Illinois House of Representatives.

== Biography ==
McDonald was born in Chambersburg, Pennsylvania in April 1797, one of seven children born to Mary (née Campbell) and Edward McDonald who both had emigrated from Ireland. His mother was of Scottish ancestry. McDonald worked as a bookeeper for his uncle before moving to Wayne County, Illinois in 1825 where he taught and clerked. He then worked in the lead mines in Galena, Illinois for 18 months before moving to Calhoun County, Illinois where he served as sheriff (1836–1840).

He served as a state representative representing Greene, Calhoun, and Jersey counties in the 12th Illinois General Assembly; and Greene and Calhoun counties in the 13th and 14th Illinois General Assemblies.

He was married to Ann Red, also of Pennsylvania and of Irish descent, whom he met in Calhoun County they had six children: Mary, John, James, Charles, Ann, and Stephen. He died in Calhoun County in July 1846. His son, John McDonald, also served in the State Assembly for two terms in the 24th and 36th Illinois General Assemblies.
