= Robert F. Barnett =

American politician

Member of the Illinois House of Representatives
- In office 1850–1852

Member of the Illinois Senate
- In office 1842–1844

Member of the Illinois House of Representatives
- In office 1840–1842

Personal details
- Born: 1807 Bourbon County, Kentucky
- Died: 1864 (aged 56–57) Clinton, Illinois
- Party: Democratic

Robert F. Barnett was an American politician who served as a member of the Illinois House of Representatives and the Illinois Senate.

== Biography ==
Barnett was born in 1807 in Bourbon County, Kentucky. In 1832, he moved to DeWitt County, Illinois where he farmed land his father had purchased for him and served as a justice of the peace. Barnett was a Democrat known for his strong anti-slavery views.

Barnett served in the Illinois House of Representatives from 1840 to 1842 in the 12th Illinois General Assembly representing Macon and DeWitt counties; and then as a state senator from 1842 to 1844 in the 13th Illinois General Assembly representing McLean, Livingston, DeWitt, Piatt, and Macon counties. He returned as a state representative in the 17th Illinois General Assembly from 1850 to 1852 representing DeWitt and McLean counties.

== Personal life ==
In 1831, he married Margaret J. Mills; they had 10 children. He died in 1864 in Clinton, Illinois. His son, Nathan Barnett, ran for governor of Illinois on the Populist ticket in the 1892 Illinois gubernatorial election.
