= William Hickman =

William Hickman may refer to:

- Wild Bill Hickman (William Adams Hickman, 1815–1883), frontiersman in the American West
- Bill Hickman (William Hickman, 1921–1986), stunt driver/actor
- William Edward Hickman (1908–1928), American criminal
- William Hickman (Illinois politician), 19th century Illinois state representative
- Sir William Hickman, 2nd Baronet (1629–1682), English politician
- W. Albert Hickman (1878–1957), Canadian designer and manufacturer of fast boats
