= John Canaday (Illinois politician) =

American politician

Member of the Illinois House of Representatives
- In office 1842–1844

John Canaday was an American politician who served as a member of the Illinois House of Representatives.

He served as a state representative representing Vermilion County in the 13th Illinois General Assembly.
