= Eugenie Keefer Bell =

American artist

- Born: May 2, 1951 (age 74)
- Spouse: Robert Bell

Eugenie Keefer Bell (born May 2, 1951) is an American-Australian artist and professor of architecture, who is notable for creating jewellery.

Keefer Bell trained in San Diego and moved to Australia in 1981. She spent five years teaching and working in Tasmania before moving to Perth. Examples of her work, including brooches and jewellery, which are in the collections of the Museum of Fine Arts Houston, the National Gallery of Australia, the National Gallery of Victoria, the Museum of Applied Arts and Sciences and the Smithsonian American Art Museum.

Bell's designs move between forms that reflect her architectural interests and a 'lyrical organic' style, with her particular strength being in making jewellery using hollow forms, combined with emphasis on surface decoration, and an element of implied narrative.

In 2023, Dr Eugenie Keefer Bell was awarded a Life Fellowship of the Australian Institute of Architects in recognition of her 'significant contribution to the advancement of architecture and design'.

== Exhibitions ==
Exhibitions include:

- 1996, Intervals, Galerie Dusseldorf Perth
- 10 February to 19 March 2011, Elements: Metal, Craft + Design Canberra
- 5 November – 19 December 2015, discover, define, develop, deliver, Craft + Design Canberra
