= John McDonald (Illinois state representative, Jo Daviess county) =

American politician

Member of the Illinois House of Representatives
- In office 1842–1844

John McDonald was an American politician who served as a member of the Illinois House of Representatives.

He served as a state representative representing Jo Daviess County in the 13th Illinois General Assembly.

He defeated Daniel Stone of the Whig Party in the August 1, 1842 election by a vote of 900 to 822.
