= Peter C. Vance =

American politician

Member of the Illinois House of Representatives
- In office 1842–1844

Peter C. Vance or P. C. Vance was an American politician who served as a member of the Illinois House of Representatives.

He served as a state representative representing Brown County and Schuyler County in the 13th Illinois General Assembly.
