= John Greene (Illinois politician) =

American politician

Member of the Illinois House of Representatives
- In office 1842–1843

Personal details
- Died: February 3, 1843

John Greene was an American politician who served as a member of the Illinois House of Representatives.

He served as a state representative representing Greene County in the 13th Illinois General Assembly.

He died on February 3, 1843, while in office.
