= Ted Mitchell =

Ted or Tedd Mitchell may refer to:

- Ted Mitchell (American football) (1905–1985)
- Tedd L. Mitchell (born 1962), American physician and academic
- Ted Mitchell (EastEnders), fictional character from EastEnders
- Teddy Mitchell, fictional character from EastEnders

== See also ==
- Edward Mitchell (disambiguation), including Ed Mitchell
- Todd Mitchell (born 1966), American professional basketball player
