= Willis Dougherty =

American politician

Member of the Illinois House of Representatives
- In office 1842–1844

Willis Dougherty was an American politician who served as a member of the Illinois House of Representatives. He had two daughters and one son.

He served as a state representative representing Clark County in the 13th Illinois General Assembly.
