= David Epler =

American politician

Member of the Illinois House of Representatives
- In office 1842–1844

David Epler was an American politician who served as a member of the Illinois House of Representatives in the 1840s.

He served as a state representative representing Morgan County in the 13th Illinois General Assembly.
