= Hubbard Graves =

American politician

Member of the Illinois House of Representatives
- In office 1842–1844

Hubbard Graves was an American politician who served as a member of the Illinois House of Representatives.

He served as a state representative representing Stephenson County and Carroll County in the 13th Illinois General Assembly.>
