= Andrew J. Dickenson =

American politician from Illinois (fl. 1842–1844)

Member of the Illinois House of Representatives
- In office 1842–1844

Andrew J. Dickenson was an American politician who served as a member of the Illinois House of Representatives.

He served as a state representative representing Monroe County and Randolph County in the 13th Illinois General Assembly.
