= Reuben Harrison =

American politician

Member of the Illinois Senate
- In office 1842–1842

Personal details
- Born: June 12, 1779 Rockingham County, Virginia
- Died: May 3, 1852 (aged 72) Summerfield, Alabama
- Party: Whig

Reuben Harrison was an American politician who was elected to the Illinois Senate.

== Biography ==
Harrison was born on June 12, 1779 in Rockingham County, Virginia. In 1818, he moved to Kentucky and then in 1822 to Sangamon County, Illinois. In 1842, he was elected to the Illinois Senate in the 13th Illinois General Assembly representing Sangamon county with (1,411 votes out of 2,365 votes cast) defeating Samuel Grubb (781 votes) and fellow whig William G. Cantrell (173 votes).

He was immediately embroiled in controversy. The state had just completed a reapportionment of seats in 1841 which created a new Senate district consisting of Sangamon county alone which had been carved out from the prior district which comprised Sangamon, Menard, Logan, and Christian counties. A dispute arose as the prior district was represented by Edward D. Baker who still had two years remaining on his term as Senator. The issue was referred to the Select Committee for resolution and it was decided that it would be unfair to have two senators representing Sangamon county and Harrison was excluded. No one contested the decision; and Harrision returned to his life as a farmer.

== Personal life ==
He married Parthenia Harrison on May 16, 1804, in Virginia; they had one child before she died. On November 29, 1810, he married Barbara A. Harnsberger; they had 4 children He died on May 3, 1852 in Summerfield, Alabama.
