= John Crain (Illinois politician) =

American politician

Member of the Illinois Senate
- In office 1842–1846

John Crain was an American politician who served as a member of the Illinois Senate. He served as a state senator representing Perry County in the 13th and the 14th Illinois General Assemblies.
