= Harry L. Miller =

American politician

Member of the Illinois House of Representatives
- In office 1842–1846

Harry L. Miller was an American politician who served as a member of the Illinois House of Representatives.

He served as a state representative representing Fulton County in the 13th and 14th Illinois General Assemblies.
