= Edward Mitchell (footballer) =

English footballer

Personal information
- Full name: Edward Thomas Mitchell
- Date of birth: 1892
- Place of birth: Middlesbrough, England
- Date of death: 6 January 1916 (aged 23–24)
- Place of death: Béthune, France
- Position(s): Forward

Senior career*
| Years | Team | Apps | (Gls) |
| 1912–1913 | Reading | 8 | (1) |
| 1913–1914 | Swansea Town | | |
- *Club domestic league appearances and goals

Edward Thomas Mitchell (1892 – 6 January 1916) was an English footballer who played in the Southern League for Reading and Swansea Town as a centre or inside forward. He was nicknamed 'Ginger'.

== Personal life ==
By 1911, Mitchell was based at Bulford Barracks with the Royal Field Artillery. On 4 August 1914, the day Britain entered the First World War, Mitchell re-enlisted in the Royal Field Artillery in Scarborough as a gunner; he took part in the Battle of Mons in September and was wounded the following month. On 6 January 1916, having risen to the rank of sergeant, Mitchell was severely wounded during combat on the Western Front and was evacuated to No. 33 Casualty Clearing Station, Béthune, where he died of his wounds. He was buried in Béthune Town Cemetery Extension.

== Career statistics ==
Appearances and goals by club, season and competition
| Club | Season | League | | | FA Cup | | Total | |
| Club | Season | Division | Apps | Goals | Apps | Goals | Apps | Goals |
|---|---|---|---|---|---|---|---|---|
| Reading | 1912–13 | Southern League First Division | 8 | 1 | 0 | 0 | 8 | 1 |
| Career total | | | 8 | 1 | 0 | 0 | 8 | 1 |
