= Ben Brown (blogger) =

American blogger (born 1978)

Ben Brown (born January 25, 1978, in San Francisco, California, United States) is a co-founder of the social networking website Consumating. Raised in Derwood, Maryland, he attended Colonel Zadok A. Magruder High School, he began attending the University of Maryland in 1996 but did not complete his degree in English and instead dropped out in 2000 in order to pursue personal interests.

== Publishing ==
Ben has been a co-founder of several zines including FlabJab, TEETH, and Über. His personal website http://benbrown.com/ has been in existence since 1997 and has at times served as an outlet for his creative works of fiction, as a personal blog, and also as a connecting reference for his software and literary publications.

In 2001 he co-founded an "ultra-micro-mini" publishing company with James Stegall named So New Media and used it to create and publish the literary magazine Words! Words! Words! as well as the public performance venue Bookpunk.

== Internet ==
In 1999, Brown co-founded the Deepleap website which provided an extensible utility for searching and interacting with various websites, social bookmarking, and eventually user-generated XML feeds for creating custom web applications. The site shut down in late 2000 for financial reasons.

In 2001, he moved to New Zealand where he was on the team that created an online tool for the certification of milk and dairy exports for the Ministry of Agriculture and Forestry. While in New Zealand, he was also hired to write episodes of a popular children's television show, Squirt.

In 2002, he and Adam Mathes created the Personals sub-section on their zine Über, which served as the initial foundation for and was eventually renamed to Consumating.

Ben served as founding editor for the Austinist social event blog beginning in early 2005. In late December of that year, he announced the CNET purchase of Consumating, ceased work with Austinist, and moved to San Francisco to work on Consumating with Josh Goldberg.

On April 3, 2007, Ben announced he was leaving CNET and Consumating to work on a next-generation community site with extreme programmer Robert Swirsky.

In November 2018, Ben announced he had sold XOXCO, the Howdy chatbot, and the Botkit open source framework to Microsoft.

== See also ==
- Blogging
