= Charles F. Ewing =

American politician

Member of the Illinois House of Representatives
- In office 1842–1844

Charles F. Ewing was an American politician who served as a member of the Illinois House of Representatives.

He served as a state representative representing Logan County and Mason County in the 13th Illinois General Assembly.
