= Bob Bell (Australian footballer) =

Australian rules footballer

Personal information
- Full name: Bob Bell
- Born: 22 June 1953
- Died: 12 October 2010 (aged 57)
- Original team: Noble Park
- Height: 191 cm (6 ft 3 in)
- Weight: 88 kg (194 lb)

Playing career^{1}
| Years | Club | Games (Goals) |
| 1971–72, 1974 | South Melbourne | 13 (0) |
- ^{1} Playing statistics correct to the end of 1974.

Bob Bell (22 June 1953 – 12 October 2010) was an Australian rules footballer who played with South Melbourne in the Victorian Football League (VFL).
