= Robert Bell (Irish geologist) =

Irish geologist

- Born: 29 December 1864; Ballycreen, County Down
- Died: 12 April 1934 (aged 69); Belfast
- Known for: amateur geologist and mineralogist
- Awards: Belfast Naturalists' Field Club Commemoration Medal (1926)
- Scientific career
- Fields: Geology

Robert Bell (29 December 1864 – 12 April 1934) was an Irish riveter with Harland & Wolff and amateur geologist, mineral and fossil collector. He was described by Robert Lloyd Praeger as "the working-man naturalist."

== Early life ==
Robert Bell was born in Ballycreen, County Down in 1864. Sources conflict on his exact date of birth, the possibilities being 20 May, 22 May, though most sources state 29 December. He later moved to Belfast, becoming a hot riveter in Harland & Wolff's shipyards.

== Geological work ==
Despite the full-time work in the shipyards, as a teenager Bell would spend his spare time studying in the Belfast Museum. It was during this time that he developed an interest in geology, and began to collect specimens of minerals and fossils at the weekends. Bell discovered the skull of the fossil Ichthyosaurus communis in 1885, in lias clay in the mountains outside of Belfast. When he married Margaret Millar in 1896, he began to spend time at her parents' home in Randalstown, County Antrim. In 1912, he was made a lifelong member of Mineralogical Society of London. Over time Bell was recognised as an authority on local geology, aiding visiting scientists, led many field trips, and prepared and catalogued specimens. In particular his skill with a geology hammer was noted, being referred to as "Knight of the Hammer". He assisted Dr W.F. Hume of the Egyptian Geological Survey, and George William Lamplugh of the Geological Survey of Ireland.

Bell was a member of the Belfast Naturalists' Field Club from 1893. He would display his specimens at the club's annual social evening, winning the award for best exhibit numerous times. Bell was awarded an Honorary Membership by the club in 1925, receiving the club's Commemoration Medal in 1926 for his scientific contributions. He also discovered a Neolithic flint factory on Black Mountain, above Belfast in 1922. A portion of Bell's collection of zeolite minerals is now in the Ulster Museum, which includes many first records for Ireland. The Ashcroft Collection of Irish zeolite collection in the Natural History Museum, London is also based around Bell's specimens. However, Bell sold the majority of his specimens to dealers, collectors, universities and museums. Two minerals which Bell collected were new to science and were named by Cecil Edgar Tilley scawtite and larnite in honour of County Antrim, where they were discovered. Bell was also an Honorary Member of the Belfast Natural History and Philosophical Society, and also had an interest in botany.

== Later life ==
Bell worked in the shipyards for forty years, and was laid off in 1924. By this point Bell had become deaf, and suffered from depression at first, but then dedicated himself to his scientific work. Owing to an application of a number of prominent Ulster intellectuals, Bell was awarded a civil-list pension in 1930. Bell's son James worked at the Royal Belfast Academical Institution, was a fellow of Trinity College, Dublin, working in the fields of chemistry and medicine. Bell and his wife had four other children, including two daughters. He died on 12 April 1934 in Belfast.

A blue plaque to Robert Bell was unveiled in Ballynahinch, near his birthplace of Ballycreen.
