= 13th Illinois General Assembly =

Meeting of the Illinois state legislature from 1842 to 1844

The 13th Illinois General Assembly, consisting of the Illinois Senate and the Illinois House of Representatives, met from December 5, 1842, to March 6, 1843 (1st session).

The 13th General Assembly was preceded by the 12th Illinois General Assembly, and was succeeded by the 14th Illinois General Assembly.

On January 14, 1841, during the 12th Illinois General Assembly, the ratio of population per Senate seat was fixed at 12,000, and for Representatives at 4,000 resulting in a Senate of forty-one members and a House of one hundred twenty-one members. This arrangement lasted until February 25, 1847, when a new apportionment was made.

== Senate ==
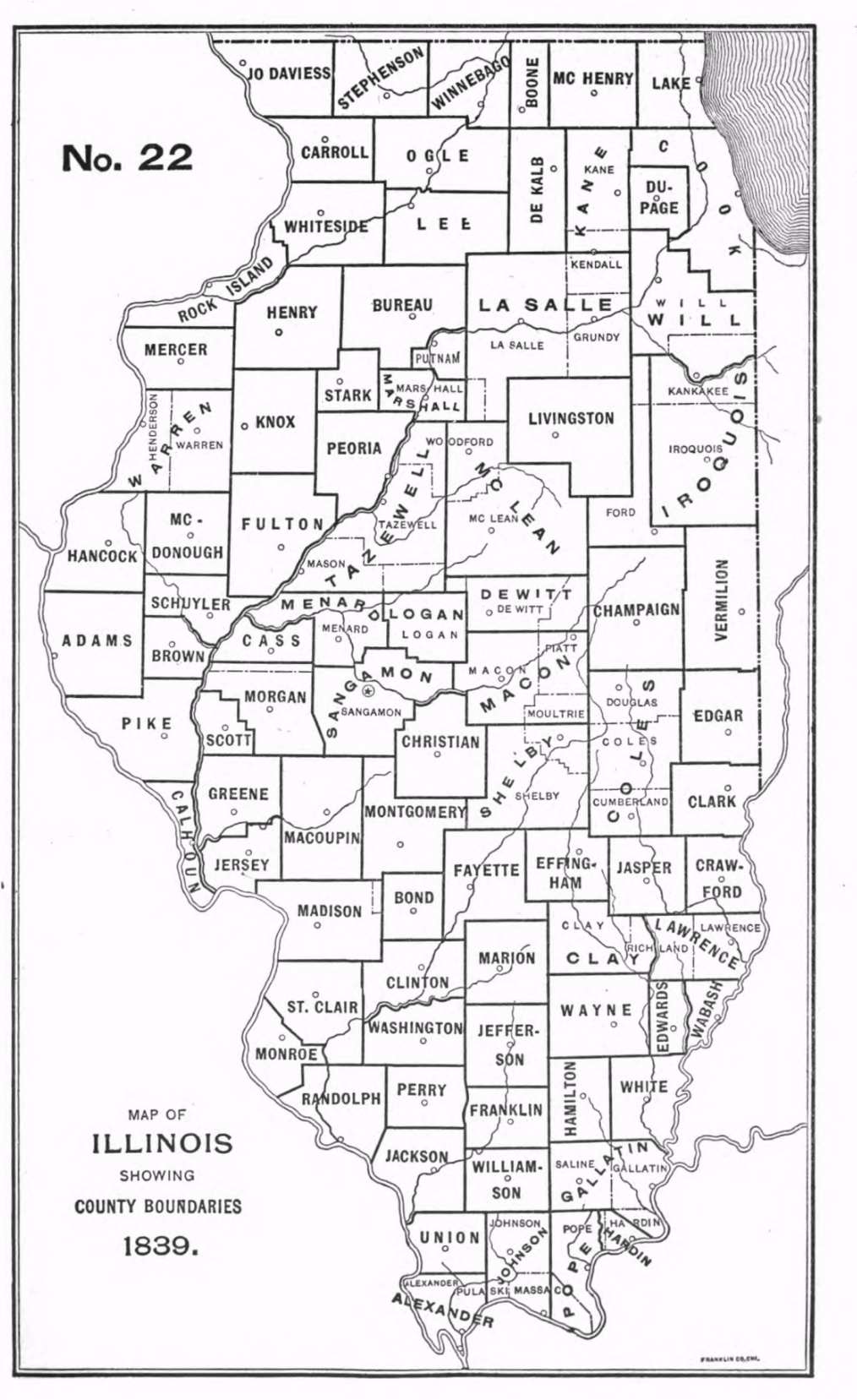
Map of Illinois county boundaries in 1839

The reapportionment of the Senate created problems as it made no accounting for the sixteen senators whose terms did not expire creating a number of disputes. Holdover senators combined with newly elected senators led to 4 senators in districts where the new apportionment had only allocated 3 senators (Madison, St. Clair, Monroe, and Randolph counties). As the situation was deemed too difficult to solve and was not challenged, the Senate retained all 4 senators and the Senate had 42 members for the length of the term.

Seats in District	Counties represented	Image	Senator	Remarks
1	Sangamon		Edward D. Baker	Disputed. Baker was the holdover senator with two years remaining on his term. The apportionment of 1841 reduced his district from 4 counties (Sangamon, Menard, Logan, and Christian) to Sangamon county alone but not realizing Baker had two years yet to serve. Harrison won election as Senator in the new district resulting in two senators in the same district when there should only be one. The controversey was referred to the Select Committee for resolution and it was decided that it would be unfair to have two senators representing Sangamon county and Harrison was excluded. No one contested the decision.
1	Sangamon		Reuben Harrison	
1	McLean · Livingston · DeWitt· Piatt · Macon		Robert F. Barnett	
1	Rock Island · Henry · Whiteside · Lee		John Buford	
1	St. Clair		Seth Catlin	
1	Greene · Calhoun		Alfred W. Cavarly	Disputed. English ultimately resigned.
1	Greene · Calhoun		Revill W. English	Disputed. English ultimately resigned.
1	Perry · Clinton · Washington		John Crain	
1	Tazewell · Marshall · Putnam		Richard N. Cullom	
1	White		William H. Davidson	
1	Hancock		Jacob C. Davies	
1	Union · Alexander		John Dougherty	
1	Fayette · Effingham · Clay		Akins Evans	
1	Vermilion · Champaign		William Fithian	
1	Scott · Cass		James Gilham	Disputed
1	Scott · Cass		T. M. Kilpatrick	Disputed
1	Macoupin · Jersey		John Harris	
1	Jo Daviess · Stephenson · Carroll		George W. Harrison	
1	Morgan		John Henry	
1	Cook · Lake		Samuel Hoard	Disputed
1	Cook · Lake		John Pearson	Disputed
1	Crawford · Lawrence · Jasper		John Houston	
1	Monroe · Randolph ★		James A. James	Disputed ★ Both senators were retained effectively allocating the district 2 senators
1	Monroe · Randolph ★		Jacob Feaman	Disputed ★ Both senators were retained effectively allocating the district 2 senators
1	Bond · Montgomery · Christian		Benjamin Johnson	
1	Gallatin		George Leviston	
1	Fulton · Peoria		David Markley	
1	Will · DuPage · Iroquois		Joel A. Matteson	
1	Knox · Mercer		William McMurty	
1	Kane · McHenry · Boone · DeKalb		Ira Minard	
1	Edgar		Nelson W. Nunnally	
1	Clark · Coles		Nathaniel Parker	
1	Jackson · Williamson · Franklin		Braxton Parrish	
1	Adams		James H. Ralston	Resigned
1	Ogle · Winnebago		Spooner Ruggles	
1	LaSalle		Michael Ryan	
1	Wayne · Wabash · Edwards		Rigson B. Slocumb	
1	Madison		George Smith	
1	Warren · McDonough · Henderson		Wyatt B. Stapp	
1	Peoria · Stark · Bureau		W. W. Thompson	
1	Brown · Schuyler		Jacob Vandeventer	
1	Shelby		Peter Warren	
1	Pope · Hardin · Johnson		George W. Waters	
1	Jefferson County · Hamilton · Marion		Robert A. D. Wilbanks	
1	Pike		Thomas Worthington	
1	Menard · Logan · Mason		Lewis B. Wynne	

== House ==
Seats in District	Counties represented	Image	Representative	Remarks
1	Lake		Richard Murphy	
3	Cook		Isaac N. Arnold	
3	Cook		Hart L. Stewart	
3	Cook		Lott Whitcomb	
1	Iroquois		Isaac Courtwright	
1	DuPage		Addison Collins	
2	Will		Jeduthan Hatch	
2	Will		David L. Gregg	
3	Kane · McHenry · Boone · DeKalb		William M. Jackson	
3	Kane · McHenry · Boone · DeKalb		Henry Madden	
3	Kane · McHenry · Boone · DeKalb		Alfred E. Ames	
3	LaSalle		Elisha Bibbens	
3	LaSalle		William H. Cushman	
3	LaSalle		James H. Woodworth	
1	Peoria		Levi A. Hannaford	
1	Stark · Bureau		John H. Bryant	
1	Stark · Bureau		Cyrus Langworthy	
2	Tazewell		Pierre Menard	
2	Tazewell		Middleton Tackerberry	
1	Marshall · Putnam		Robert F. Bell	
1	Stephenson · Carroll		Hubbard Graves	
1	Jo Daviess		John McDonald	One of two "John McDonald's" serving in the House
1	Rock Island · Henry		Joshua Harper	
1	Whiteside · Lee		Aaron C. Jackson	
1	Winnebago		Darius Adams	
1	Ogle		Leonard Andrus	
1	Schuyler		Samuel Horner	
1	Brown		Stephen D. Hambaugh	
1	Brown · Schuyler		Peter C. Vance	
5	Adams		Orville H. Browning	
5	Adams		Peter B. Garrett	
5	Adams		Abraham Jonas	
5	Adams		Richard W. Starr	
5	Adams		Almeron Wheat	
2	Hancock		Thomas H. Owen	
2	Hancock		William Smith	
1	McDonough		Hugh Erwin	
2	Warren · Henderson		Maximilian Haley	
2	Warren · Henderson		William S. Stockton	
1	Knox		Julius Manning	
1	Knox · Mercer		Reuben H. Spicer	
3	Fulton		Horace Turner	
3	Fulton		Harry L. Miller	
3	Fulton		Joseph L. Sharpe	
1	Fulton · Peoria		Samuel Hackleton	
4	Sangamon		James N. Brown	
4	Sangamon		William Caldwell	
4	Sangamon		Stephen T. Logan	
4	Sangamon		William Hickman	
1	Menard		Elisha Bone	
1	Logan · Mason		Charles F. Ewing	
1	McLean		Mahlon Bishop	
1	McLean · Livingston		Andrew McMillan	
1	DeWitt		James K. Scott	
1	Piatt · Macon		Samuel G. Nesbitt	
4	Morgan		Newton Cloud	
4	Morgan		David Epler	
4	Morgan		William Weatherford	
4	Morgan		Richard Yates Sr.	
3	Pike		William Blair	
3	Pike		Benjamin D. Brown	
3	Pike		Alexander Starne	
1	Cass		John W. Pratt	
2	Scott		Lorenzo Edwards	
2	Scott		Edward Mitchell	
2	Macoupin		Robert W. Glass	
2	Macoupin		Sergeant Gobble	
1	Jersey		Samuel T. Kendall	
2	Greene		John Greene †	Died February 3, 1843
2	Greene		Alfred Hinton	
1	Greene · Calhoun		John McDonald	One of two "John McDonald's" serving in the House
3	Madison		Robert Aldrich	
3	Madison		John Bailhache	
3	Madison		Curtis Blakeman Jr.	
3	St. Clair		Gustavus Koener	
3	St. Clair		Philip Penn	
3	St. Clair		Amos Thompson	
3	Monroe · Randolph		Jacob J. Danner	
3	Monroe · Randolph		Andrew J. Dickenson	
3	Monroe · Randolph		William McBride	
1	Bond		James N. Davis	
1	Montgomery		Easton Whitten	
1	Christian		H. M. Vandeveer	
2	Fayette · Effingham		Thomas M. Loy	
2	Fayette · Effingham		John Shirley	
1	Clay		Peter Greene	
1	Shelby		Jonathan B. Howard	
1	White		John S. Lawler	
1	Wabash		John Compton	
1	Wayne		Edward Wist	
1	Edwards		William Pickering	
2	Lawrence		William G. Anderson	
2	Lawrence		Jesse K. DuBois	
2	Crawford · Jasper		Guy W. Smith	
2	Crawford · Jasper		William Wilson	
2	Clark		Willis Dougherty	
2	Clark		James Lockard	
3	Coles		Joseph Fowler	
3	Coles		George M. Hanson	
3	Coles		Orlando B. Fricklin	
1	Edgar		Hall Simms	
2	Vermilion		John Canaday	
2	Vermilion		James Norris	
1	Champaign		Mathew W. Busey	
2	Union · Alexander		John Cochran	
2	Union · Alexander		James J. Hunsacker	
1	Pope · Hardin		Philip Vineyard	
1	Johnson		Andrew J. Kuykendall	
1	Williamson		John T. Davis	
1	Jackson		Richard A. Bradley	
1	Franklin		Achilles D. Dollins	
3	Gallatin		Thomas S. Hick	
3	Gallatin		John A. McClernand	
3	Gallatin		Abner Flanders	
1	Hamilton		John Douglas	
1	Hamilton · Jefferson · Marion		William Brinkley	
1	Jefferson		Stephen G. Hicks	
1	Marion		James Marshall	
1	Perry		John D. Burklow	
2	Clinton · Washington		Elias S. Dennis	
2	Clinton · Washington		John White	

== Works cited ==
- Moses, John (1892). Illinois, historical and statistical comprising the essential facts of its planting and growth as a province, county, territory and state. Vol. II.
- Blue Book of the State of Illinois. 1919.
- Blue Book of the State of Illinois - Illinois Legislative Roster — 1818-2024 (PDF). 2024. Archived from the original (PDF) on July 15, 2026.
- Laws of the state of Illinois, passed by the twelfth general assembly : at their session, began and held at Springfield, on the seventh of December, one thousand eight hundred and forty. William Walters Public Printers. 1841. pp. 23–25.
- Pease, Theodore Calvin (1923). Statistical Series: Illinois Election Returns (1818-1848). Vol. 1. Illinois State Historical Library.
