= Robert Bell (artist and curator) =

Australian artist and curator

Robert Stewart Bell AM
- Born: 29 December 1946; Perth, Western Australia
- Died: 28 July 2018 (aged 71); Canberra, Australia
- Occupation: Arts administrator
- Known for: Curator at the National Gallery of Australia (-2016)
- Spouse: Eugenie Keefer Bell

Robert Stewart Bell AM (29 December 1946 – 28 July 2018) was an Australian artist and arts curator, best known for his focus on decorative arts. He also worked as an artist in ceramics and textiles.

== Biography ==
Bell was born in Perth, Western Australia.

From 1967, he was the Senior Exhibits Designer at the Western Australian Museum.

From 1978, he was the Curator of Craft and Design at the Art Gallery of Western Australia. He has been credited as establishing the Art Gallery of WA's department of craft and design in that year.

While at the Art Gallery of Western Australia, he organised and curated the first of the inaugural 1989 Perth International Crafts Triennial, which was at the time, the largest collated exhibition of craft in an Australian gallery.

In 2000, he moved to Canberra to work as Senior curator of Australian and international decorative arts and design, at the National Gallery of Australia. He curated the Gallery's 2005-2006 exhibition, 'Transformations: The Language of Craft', which was described by then-Director Ron Radford as "the first show of its kind in the gallery's history", as they had not previously held a survey show of contemporary Australian and international studio craft. Bell's impact on the acquisition of decorative arts during his tenure at the Gallery was highlighted in 2008 by Terry Ingram in the Australian Financial Review. Ingram described his buying as 'counter-cyclical', as Bell purchased modern and contemporary crafts prior to market interest, and later focused on Australiana, especially silver.

His Doctor of Philosophy thesis was focused on the influence of Scandinavian design in Australia and was initially started at the University of Western Australia, and later transferred and awarded by the Australian National University in 2007.

In 2013, Bell was an adviser for the Futuro Relocation and Restoration Project, which focused on preserving the prefabricated Futuro House designed by Finnish architect Matti Suuronen.

In 2015, he was interviewed by ABC Radio Canberra's Louise Maher on the significance of a rare Tiffany lamp with a design based on the motif of a carp.

Bell worked at the National Gallery until his retirement from the role of Senior Curator of Decorative Arts and Design in late 2016.

While Bell had a studio art practice in ceramics and textiles, he ceased making his own art in order to focus on promoting Australian craft and design within his curatorial roles.

He died in Canberra on 28 July 2018.

=== Awards ===
- Centenary Medal for services to the decorative arts in Australia, 2001
- Australia Council Visual Art Board Emeritus Medal for service to the crafts in Australia, 2005
- Order of Australia AM for services to craft, design and museums, 2010

=== Collections ===
Bell's work is held in the National Gallery of Victoria, and includes illustrations for Jack the Giant Killer.

== Bibliography ==
- Page, Jutta-Annette, Morrin, Peter, Bell, Robert (2012). Color Ignited: Glass 1962-2012. Toledo Museum of Art (Toledo), ISBN 9780935172423
- Bell, Robert (2005). Transformations: the language of craft. National Gallery of Australia (Canberra), ISBN 0642541388
- Bell, Robert (1998). Nature as object: craft and design form Japan, Finland and Australia. Art Gallery of Western Australia (Perth). ISBN 073093621X
- Bell, Robert (1992). Design Visions. Gallery of Western Australia (Perth). ISBN 0730936031
- Bell, Robert (1989). Perth International Crafts Triennial. Gallery of Western Australia (Perth). ISSN 1034-8859
