= Benny Brown (baseball) =

Professional baseball player

- Shortstop
- Born: October 8, 1911; Kearneysville, West Virginia
- Died: July 29, 1933 (aged 21); Marcus Hook, Pennsylvania
- Batted: Unknown Threw: Right

Negro league baseball debut
- 1932, for the Newark Browns

Last appearance
- 1932, for the Bacharach Giants
- Stats at Baseball Reference

Teams
- Newark Browns (1932); Bacharach Giants (1932)

Benjamin Brown (October 8, 1911 – July 29, 1933) was an American professional baseball shortstop in the Negro leagues. He played with the Newark Browns and Bacharach Giants in 1932.
