= Peter F. Green =

American engineer

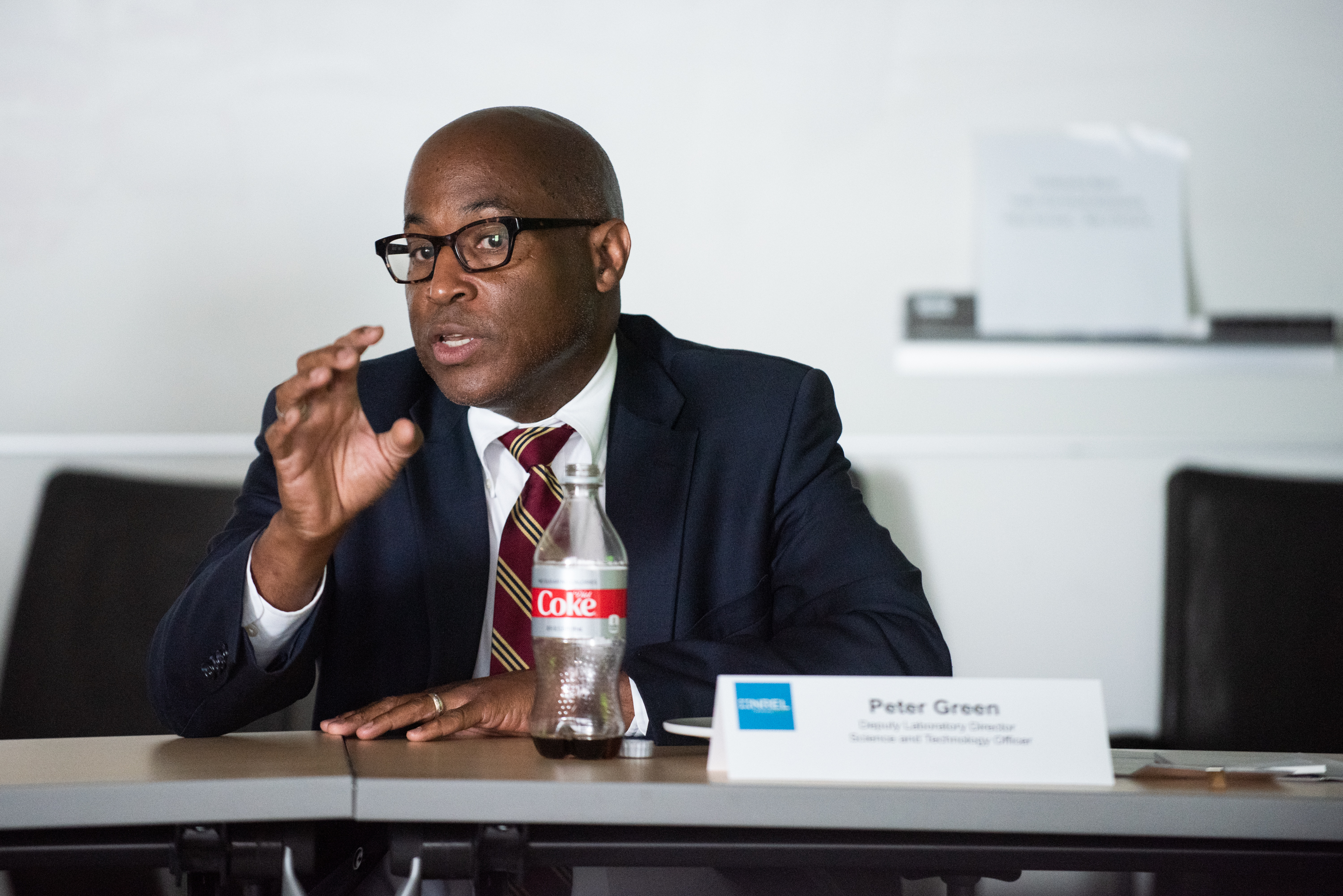
- Peter Green, speaking at the National Renewable Energy Laboratory on July 8, 2019.
- Born: Jamaica
- Education: Cornell University; Hunter College
- Awards: Member of the National Academy Engineering (2023); Fellow of the Materials Research Society (2019); Fellow of the American Association for the Advancement of Science (2016); Fellow of the American Ceramic Society (1998); Fellow of the American Physical Society (1995)
- Scientific career
- Fields: Materials science
- Institutions: National Renewable Energy Laboratory

Peter F. Green is a materials scientist and the Deputy Laboratory Director for Science and Technology at the National Renewable Energy Laboratory.

== Education ==
Green earned BA and MA degrees in physics at Hunter College in 1981, and MS and PhD degrees in materials science and engineering at Cornell University in 1985.

== Career ==
Green started his career at Sandia National Laboratories in 1985, where he was the Manager of Glass and Electronic Ceramics Research during 1990-1996. He became Professor of Chemical Engineering at the University of Texas at Austin in 1996, where he was later promoted to become B. F. Goodrich Professor of Materials Engineering.

Green was recruited to the University of Michigan in 2005 to chair the Department of Materials Science and Engineering. He was the Vincent T. and Gloria M. Gorguze Professor of Engineering and professor of Materials Science and Engineering, Chemical Engineering, and Applied Physics at the University of Michigan before being named as the new Deputy Laboratory Director for Science and Technology at the National Renewable Energy Laboratory in 2016.

In 2005, Green authored the textbook Kinetics, Transport, and Structure in Hard and Soft Materials published by CRC Press, Taylor & Francis.

Together with Sossina M. Haile and Simon Billinge, Green organized the Joint US-Africa Materials Science Institute (JUAMI - now the Joint Undertaking for an African Materials Institute), funded by the National Science Foundation. They organized workshops in Addis Ababa, Ethiopia in 2012 and in Arusha, Tanzania in 2016. Out of JUAMI, SciBridge was developed—a program to foster the scientific exchange between the US and Africa on topics in sustainable energy development.

Green was president of the Materials Research Society (MRS) in 2006.

Green was the inaugural editor-in-chief of MRS Communications. He was associate editor of Physical Review Letters in 2000-2006. Green serves on the editorial board of Progress in Energy, an IOPscience journal.

== Honors ==
- 1995: Fellow of the American Physical Society
- 1998: Fellow of the American Ceramic Society
- 2016: Fellow of the American Association for the Advancement of Science
- 2019: Fellow of the Materials Research Society
- 2023: National Academy of Engineering
