= 14th Illinois General Assembly =

Meeting of the Illinois state legislature from 1844 to 1846

The 14th Illinois General Assembly, consisting of the Illinois Senate and the Illinois House of Representatives, met from December 2, 1844, to March 3, 1845.

The 14th General Assembly was preceded by the 13th Illinois General Assembly, and was succeeded by the 15th Illinois General Assembly.

== Senate ==
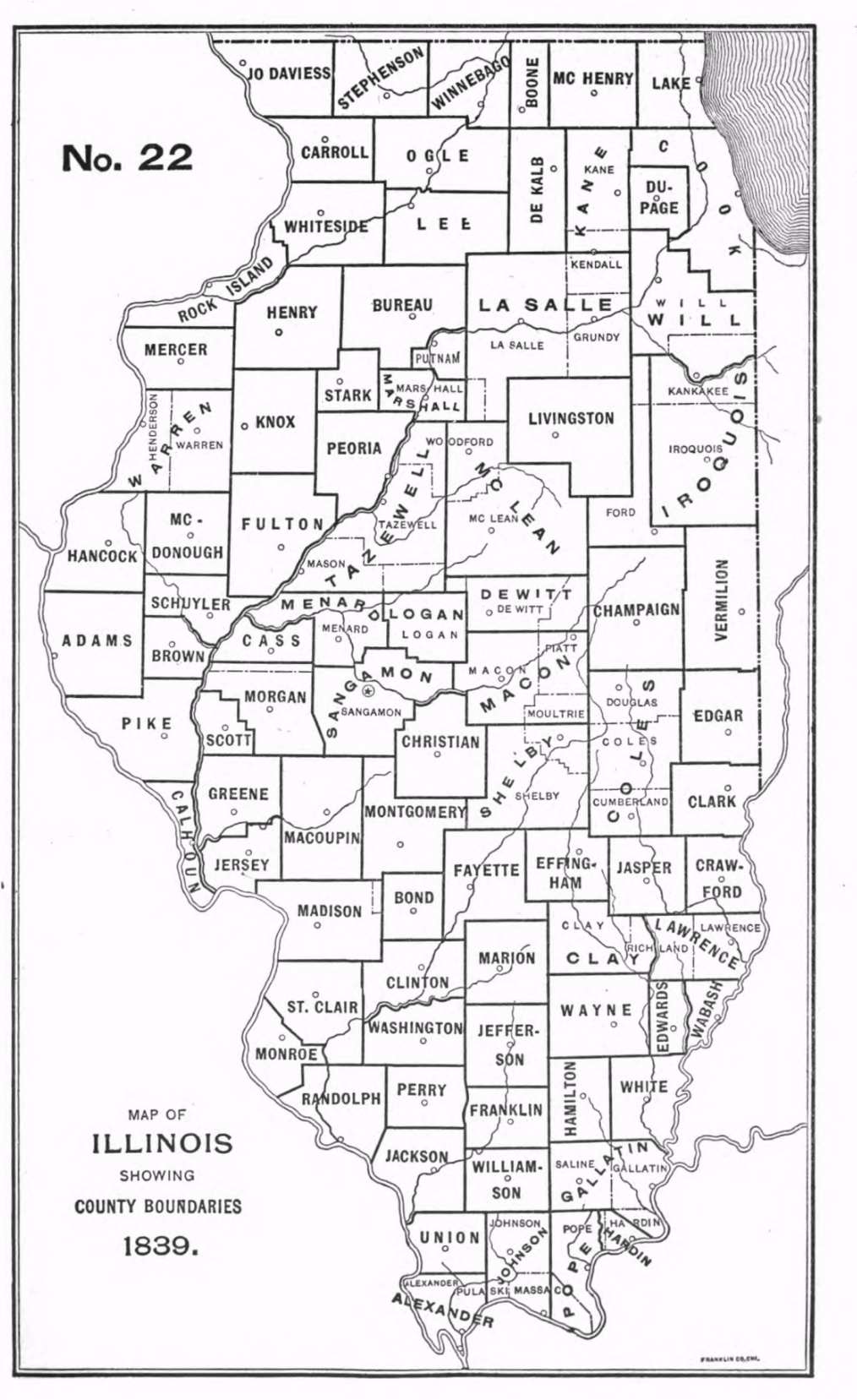
Map of Illinois county boundaries in 1839

== House ==
Seats in District	Counties represented	Image	Representative	Remarks
1	Lake		Horace Butler	
3	Cook		Isaac N. Arnold	
3	Cook		Francis C. Sherman	
3	Cook		Hart L. Stewart	
4	DuPage · Iroquois · Will		Addison Collins	
4	DuPage · Iroquois · Will		David L. Gregg	
4	DuPage · Iroquois · Will		Jacob Wagner	
4	DuPage · Iroquois · Will		Julius M. Warren	
3	Kane · McHenry · Boone · DeKalb · Kendall (part)		William M. Jackson	
3	Kane · McHenry · Boone · DeKalb · Kendall (part)		Eli G. Jewell	
3	Kane · McHenry · Boone · DeKalb · Kendall (part)		James L. Loop	
3	LaSalle · Grundy · Kendall (part)		George W. Armstrong	
3	LaSalle · Grundy · Kendall (part)		William H. W. Cushman	
3	LaSalle · Grundy · Kendall (part)		Ambrose O'Conner	
1	Peoria		Levi A. Hannaford	
1	Stark · Bureau		Benjamin L. Smith	
1	Peoria · Stark · Bureau		Barnabas M. Jackson	
2	Tazewell · Woodford (part)		Charles C. Wilcox	
2	Tazewell · Woodford (part)		Isaac Williams	
1	Marshall · Putnam		Jacob C. Morrille	
1	Stephenson · Carroll		Henry Smith	
1	Jo Daviess		Cyrus Aldrich	
1	Rock Island · Henry		Joshua Harper	
1	Whiteside · Lee		Winfield S. Wilkinson	
1	Winnebago		Anson S. Miller	
1	Ogle		Samuel M. Hitt	
1	Schuyler		John Brown	
1	Brown		Iram Nye	
1	Brown · Schuyler		William Alexander Richardson	
5	Adams		William Hendry	
5	Adams		William Miller	
5	Adams		Peter Lott	
5	Adams		x	Two seats were allocated to Marquette County but elections were never held
5	Adams		x	Two seats were allocated to Marquette County but elections were never held
2	Hancock		Almon W. Babbitt	
2	Hancock		Jacob B. Backenstos	
1	McDonough		William H. Randolph	
2	Warren · Henderson		Maximillian Haley	
2	Warren · Henderson		William D. Henderson	
1	Knox		Julius Manning	
1	Knox · Mercer		Hiram Hardie	
3	Fulton		Harry L. Miller	
3	Fulton		Lewis Winans Ross	
3	Fulton		Joseph L. Sharp	
1	Fulton · Peoria		John Zeiber	
4	Sangamon		Job Fletcher	
4	Sangamon		Stephen T. Logan	
4	Sangamon		Joseph Smith	
4	Sangamon		William D. Herndon	
1	Menard		James White	
1	Logan · Mason		John Deskines	
1	McLean · Woodford (part)		David Davis	
1	McLean · Livingston · Woodford (part)		Elias B. Myers	
1	DeWitt		James K. Scott	
1	Piatt · Macon · Moultrie (part)		Kirby Benedict	
4	Morgan		Francis Arenz	
4	Morgan		Samuel T. Matthews	
4	Morgan		Isaac D. Rawlings	
4	Morgan		Richard Yates Sr.	
3	Pike		William Blair	
3	Pike		Alexander Starne	
3	Pike		Benjamin B. Metz	
1	Cass		John W. Pratt	
2	Scott		John White	
2	Scott		James Leighton	
2	Macoupin		John Scott	
2	Macoupin		John T. Wood	
1	Jersey		James Harriott	
2	Greene		Calvin Tunnel	
2	Greene		Francis P. Vedder	
1	Greene · Calhoun		John McDonald	
3	Madison		George Barnsback	
3	Madison		Newton D. Strong	
3	Madison		George Churchill	
3	St. Clair		Samuel Anderson	
3	St. Clair		James L. D. Morrison	
3	St. Clair		Amos Thompson	
3	Monroe · Randolph		Elijah Adams	
3	Monroe · Randolph		Ezekiel W. Robbins	
3	Monroe · Randolph		John D. Whiteside	
1	Bond		James B. Woolard	
1	Montgomery		John Kirkpatrick	
1	Christian		William S. Ricks	
2	Fayette · Effingham		Isaac S. Berry	
2	Fayette · Effingham		Presley Funkhouser	
1	Clay · Richland (part)		Frankline R. Pitner	
1	Shelby		John S. Turley	
1	White		Reuben R. Emerson	
1	Wabash		John T. Youngkin	
1	Wayne		Joseph Campbell	
1	Edwards		William Pickering	
2	Lawrence · Richland (part)		William G. Anderson	
2	Lawrence · Richland (part)		Joseph H. Reed	
2	Crawford · Jasper		Eldridge S. Janney	
2	Crawford · Jasper		Richard G. Morris	
2	Clark		James Lockard	
2	Clark		Samuel Prevo	
2	Coles		Alexander P. Dunbar	
2	Coles		George M. Hanson	
1	Cumberland		Elisha H. Starkweather	Seat reallocated from Coles County
1	Edgar		Washington Alexander	
2	Vermilion		Samuel Huffman	
2	Vermilion		William J. Moore	
1	Champaign		David Cox	
2	Union · Alexander		John Cochran	
2	Union · Alexander		William A. Denning	
1	Pope · Hardin		Philip Vineyard	
1	Johnson · Massac		Andrew J. Kuykendall	
1	Williamson		John T. Davis	
1	Jackson		Richard A. Bradley	
1	Franklin		Braxton Parrish	
3	Gallatin		John M. Burnett	
3	Gallatin		Orville Sexton	
3	Gallatin		Thomas S. Hick	
1	Hamilton		William Brinkley	
1	Hamilton · Jefferson · Marion		John M. Oglesby	
1	Jefferson		Stephen G. Hicks	
1	Marion		Henderson P. Boyakin	
1	Perry		John Steele	
2	Clinton · Washington		John White	
2	Clinton · Washington		William Woodburn	

== Works cited ==
- Moses, John (1892). Illinois, historical and statistical.
- Blue Book of the State of Illinois. 1919.
- Blue Book of the State of Illinois - Illinois Legislative Roster — 1818-2024 (PDF). 2024. Archived from the original (PDF) on July 15, 2026.
- Laws of the state of Illinois, passed by the twelfth general assembly : at their session, began and held at Springfield, on the seventh of December, one thousand eight hundred and forty. William Walters Public Printers. 1841. pp. 23–25.
- Pease, Theodore Calvin (1923). Statistical Series: Illinois Election Returns (1818-1848). Vol. 1. Illinois State Historical Library.
