= John Pearson (politician) =

American politician

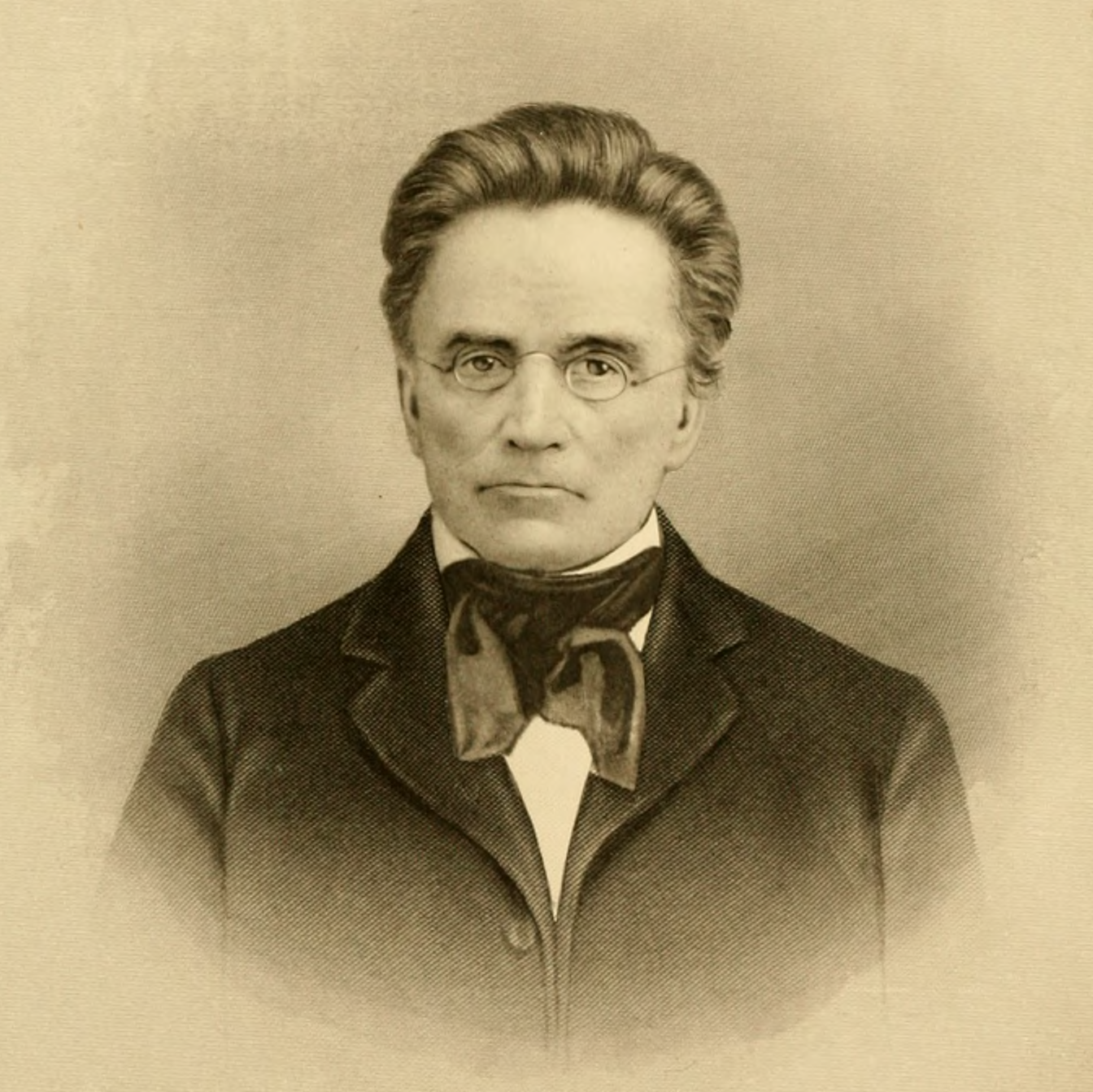

Member of the Illinois Senate from the Cook County district
- In office 1840 – 1844
- Succeeded by: Joel Aldrich Matteson

Personal details
- Born: January 1802 Avon, New York
- Died: June 1875 (aged 73)
- Party: Democratic
- Profession: Judge

John Pearson (January 1802 – June 1875) was an American judge and politician from New York. Descended from an early American family, Pearson matriculated at the College of New Jersey and then practiced law in Ohio. In 1832, he attempted to settle in Chicago, Illinois, but decided to move his family south to Danville instead due to the Black Hawk War. In Danville, Pearson became a prominent attorney and was elected to the state circuit court. After moving to Joliet, Illinois, he served two terms in the Illinois Senate. Pearson established a successful shop in California during the Gold Rush, but was robbed. He returned to Danville and managed properties until his death.

== Biography ==
John Pearson was born in Avon, New York in January 1802. He descended from Rev. Abraham Pierson, the elder, who came to the United States from England in 1639. Pearson attended College of New Jersey, then studied law under George Hosmer. In 1826, newly wed, he headed west to practice his profession. He practiced in Ravenna, Ohio, where his brother-in-law Henry Storrs previously located. Later, after visiting relatives in Detroit, Michigan, Pearson decided to head farther west to Chicago, Illinois.

Pearson arrived in Chicago in June 1832. Major Whistler, commander of Fort Dearborn, allowed the Pearsons to stay in the fort and became a family friend. As the family had arrived during the Black Hawk War, Pearson determined that Chicago was too unsafe for his family, so he moved them to Danville, Illinois. There, Pearson established a law office. In 1837, Pearson was commissioned to the seventh circuit court, where he served for three years. During this tenure, he moved the family north to Joliet, Illinois, which was part of his circuit. In 1840, Pearson was elected to the Illinois Senate as a Democrat, where he served two two-year terms.

Pearson moved to New York City in 1842, though he only stayed for four years before returning to Illinois. In 1849 he participated in the California Gold Rush, where he sold goods in Bidwell's Bar. After selling his store, he was robbed and his partners were killed. Bereft of possessions, he returned to Danville, where he spent the rest of his life managing his property holdings.

Pearson married Catherine Tiffany in 1826. Their son Gustavus C. became a wealthy industrialist in Danville. She died in 1841, and the next year he married Katherine Passage. Pearson died in June 1875.
