= Bobby Bell (Scottish footballer) =

Scottish footballer

Personal information
- Full name: Robert McDicker Bell
- Date of birth: 16 September 1934
- Place of birth: Ayr, Scotland
- Date of death: 2007 (aged 72–73)
- Place of death: Bournemouth, England
- Position: Right back

Senior career*
Years	Team	Apps	(Gls)
1953–1954	Whitletts Victoria		
1954–1956	Falkirk	1	(0)
1956–1957	Ayr United	15	(0)
1957–1965	Watford	268	(2)
1965–1969	Folkestone		
- Wealdstone
- * Club domestic league appearances and goals

Robert McDicker Bell (16 September 1934 – March 2007) was a Scottish footballer who played as a right back. He played in the Scottish football league system for Falkirk and Ayr United, before spending the majority of his playing career at English Football League club Watford. He later moved into English amateur football, first as a player, and later as a coach and manager.

== Playing career ==
Born in the Scottish town of Ayr on September 16, 1934, Bell played in Scottish Junior Football for Whitletts Victoria, and also for the British Army during his national service. Bell turned professional in August 1954 when he signed for Scottish Football League side Falkirk. Manager Bob Shankly selected Bell for one league game, before releasing him on a free transfer at the end of the 1955–56 season. Ayr United manager Neil McBain signed Bell, fielding him 15 times in the league. When McBain rejoined Watford in August 1956, he signed several former Ayr players, including Bell.

Bell became a regular first team player at Watford, and along with Cliff Holton helped Watford gain promotion to the Third Division in 1959–60, for the first time in their history. Other teammates of Bell during this period included Sammy Chung, Freddie Bunce and Dennis Uphill. Watford achieved a 4th-placed league finish in 1961, and 3rd position in 1964. The arrival of player-manager Ken Furphy in 1964 signalled the end of Bell's Watford career; Furphy was also a full back, and selected himself in preference to Bell. After spending most of the 1964–65 season in Watford's reserves, Bell joined non-league Folkestone on a free transfer in July 1965, later playing for Wealdstone.

== Later life ==
Following his retirement from professional football, Bell worked for aircraft engine manufacturer Rolls-Royce. He played for the company's football team, and managed them from 1979 until 1981. He later coached several English amateur sides, including Leverstock Green and Mill End, and also managed in Sunday league football in the 1990s. He died in 2007.
