= Edward H. Mitchell =

American businessman and publisher

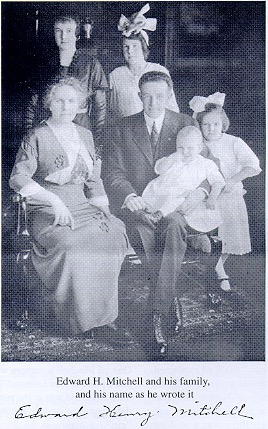
- Edward H. Mitchell and his family.
- Born: April 27, 1867; San Francisco, California
- Died: October 24, 1932 (aged 65); Palo Alto, California, US
- Occupation(s): Publisher, Printer
- Spouse: Idelle Gertrude Lanehan
- Children: 5

Edward Henry Mitchell (April 27, 1867– October 24, 1932) was an American businessman and postcard publisher of San Francisco. He was owner of the Edward H. Mitchell publishing company that was one of the most prolific postcard publishers on the western coast of the United States. He was based in San Francisco from the late 1890s to the early 1920s.

== Early life ==
Mitchell was born in San Francisco, on April 27, 1867. He was the son of John Henry Mitchell, a Methodist minister. Mitchell married Idelle Gertrude Lanehan(1870-1941) on November 26, 1891, in San Francisco at the residence of the bride's mother.

== Professional background ==
Mitchell started the Edward H. Mitchell Company in 1895. His company issued about 4,000 different post card scenes between 1898 and 1915, which included 32 postcards illustrating 14 California missions. Post Cards were often published on yellow canary colored paper. Many post cards were distributed by other California publishers. His company was located at 225 Post Street before the 1906 San Francisco earthquake, which destroyed the building. After 1906, he built a plant on Army Street where he published postcards. From the Army Street location he published thousands of divided back cards, which had views of San Francisco, the Philippines, the Hawaiian Islands, comics, and early exaggerations of California fruits and vegetables.

Mitchell bought the postcard business of California scenes and one set depicting Yellowstone National Park published by Albert Kayser of Oakland in 1898. He printed postcards for a number of other publishers, including for photographer Charles Roscoe Savage, and Michael Rieder of Los Angeles.

In Jan 1898, Mitchell published San Francisco View Book, a collection 32 of half-tone reproductions of photographs of scenes around San Francisco. In December 1899, Mitchel published the California View Calendar, which included 6 views of scenes in the state, the Cliff House, Moss Brae Falls, Mount Shasta, Yosemite National Park, Mission Santa Barbara, and the California State Capitol. The price was 75 cents.

Oscar Newman, of the Newman Post Card Co., worked with Mitchell for the February 1911, formation of Exposition Publishing Co., which was an organization that captured the souvenir post card business for the 1915 Panama–Pacific International Exposition.

== List of published works ==
- San Francisco View Book (1898)
- California View Calendar (1899)
- Oregon Scenic Souvenir Playing Cards (1902)
- Missions Of California (1898) Photographs in the Charles B. Turill Historical Collection
- Souvenir Postal Cards (1902)
- Colored Postal Cards (1902)
- Panormic View of San Francisco and Bay (1902)
- California Postal Cards (1903)
- University of California View Book (1904)
- Album Views of Carnegie Institute of Technology

In 1921 Mitchell was listed as President with F. E. Edwards as Secretary of Dominion Oil Company, 3363 Army St., San Francisco.

Mitchell retired from the postcard business in 1923. He sold his stock of 3.5 million post cards in Los Angeles for $500.00. In 1928-30 he is listed as Vice-president and treasurer of the Pacific Novelty Co. 579 Market St. S. F., Later in life he dealt in real estate and oil well leasing. He was also president of the Edward H. Mitchell Oil Company and a member of the Commonwealth Club.

== Death ==
Mitchell died on October 24, 1932, at the age of 65, in Palo Alto, California of a heart attack. He was buried at the Holy Cross Catholic Cemetery in Colma, California.

== Gallery ==
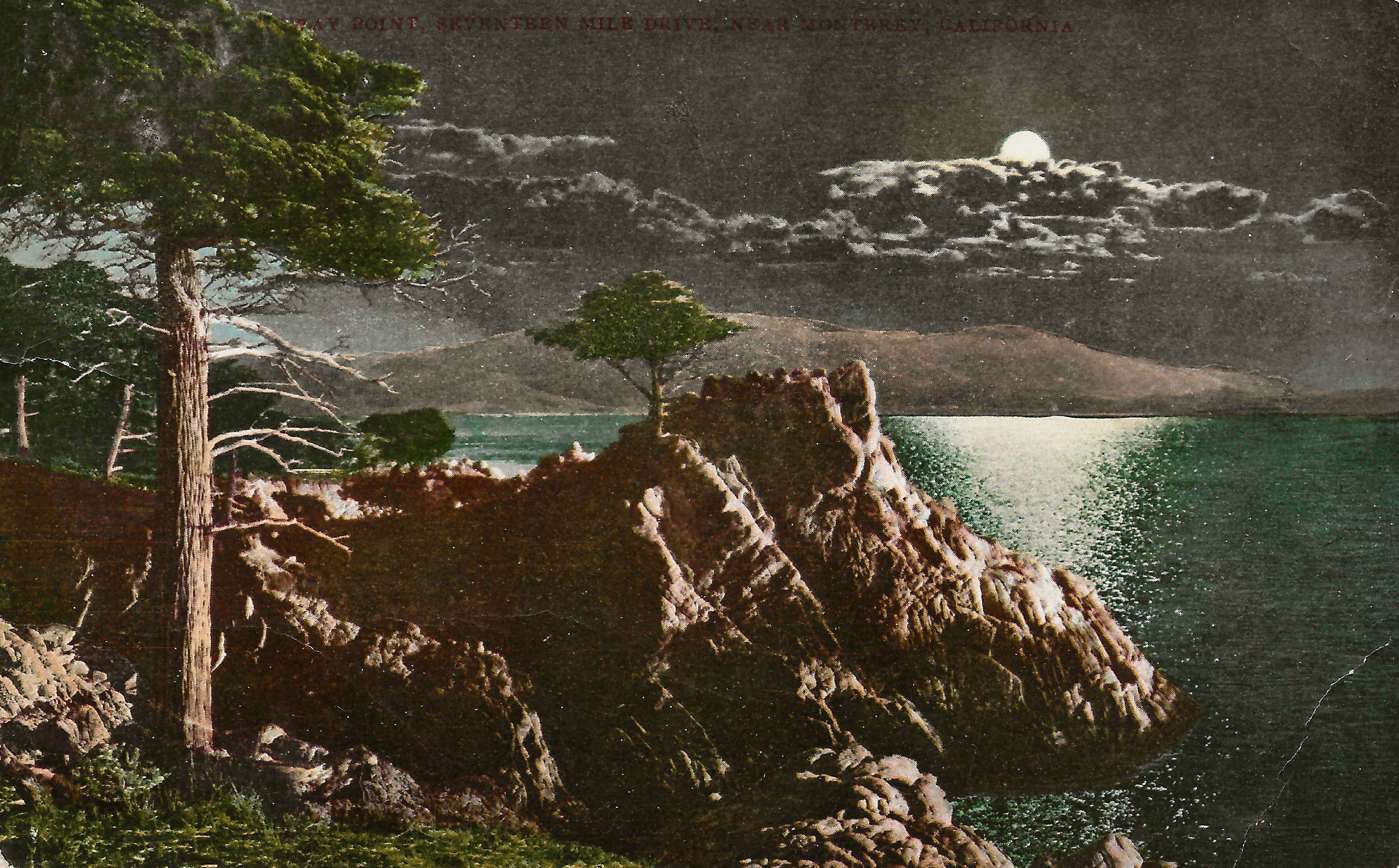
Postcard of Lone Cypress at Midway Point, 17 Mile Drive

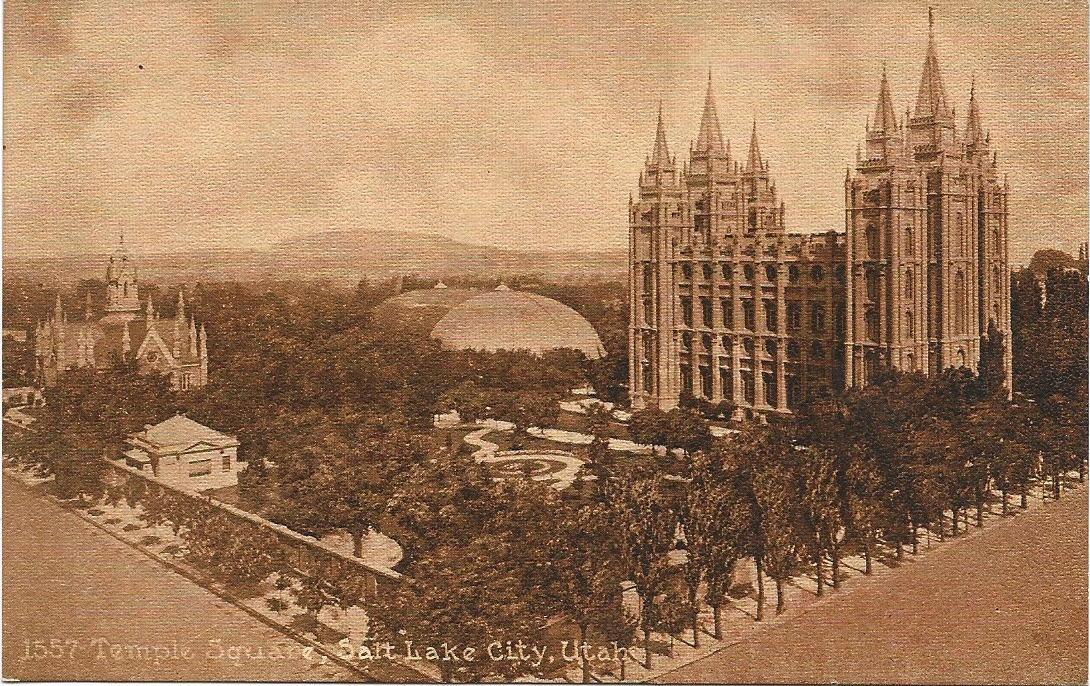
Temple Square, Salt Lake City, Utah

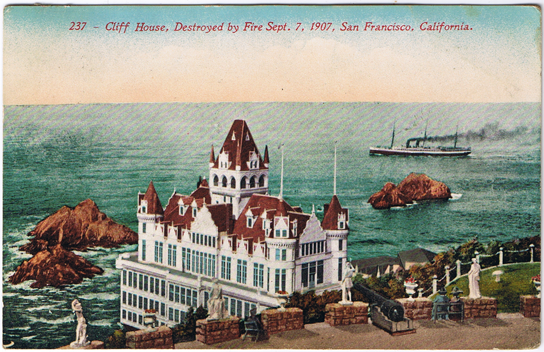
Cliff House, San Francisco, California before 1907

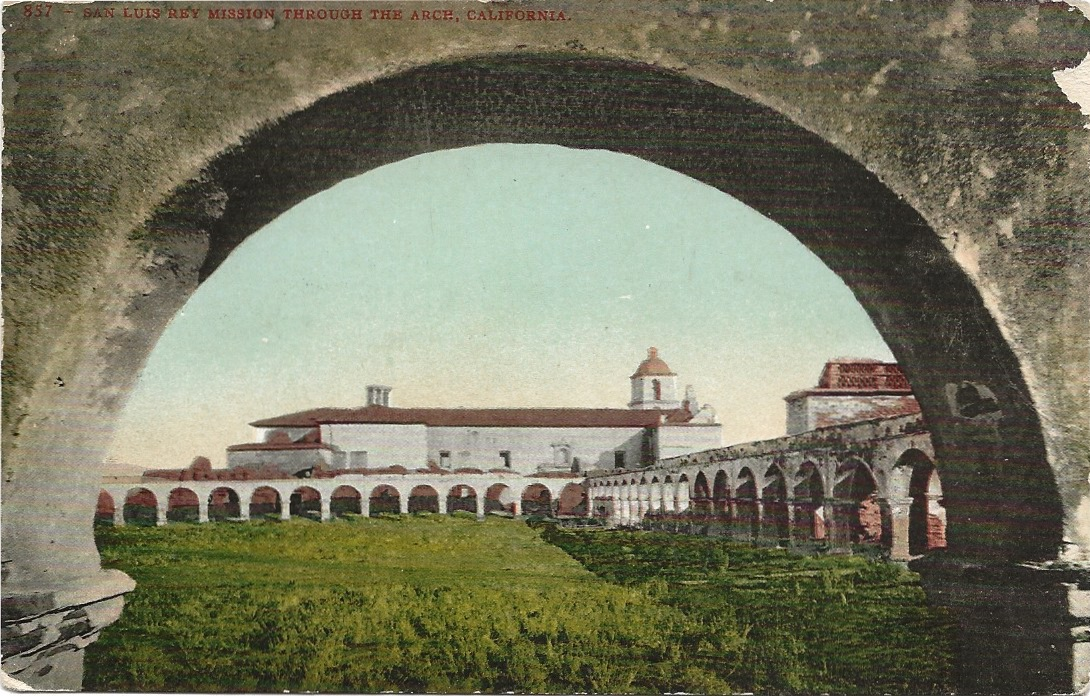
San Luis Rey Mission Through The Arch

A carload of mammoth navel oranges from California
