= 12th Illinois General Assembly =

Meeting of the Illinois state legislature from 1840 to 1842

The 12th Illinois General Assembly, consisting of the Illinois Senate and the Illinois House of Representatives, met from November 23, 1840, to December 5, 1840 (1st session) and from December 7, 1840, to March 1, 1841 (2nd session).

The 12th General Assembly was preceded by the 11th Illinois General Assembly, and was succeeded by the 13th Illinois General Assembly.

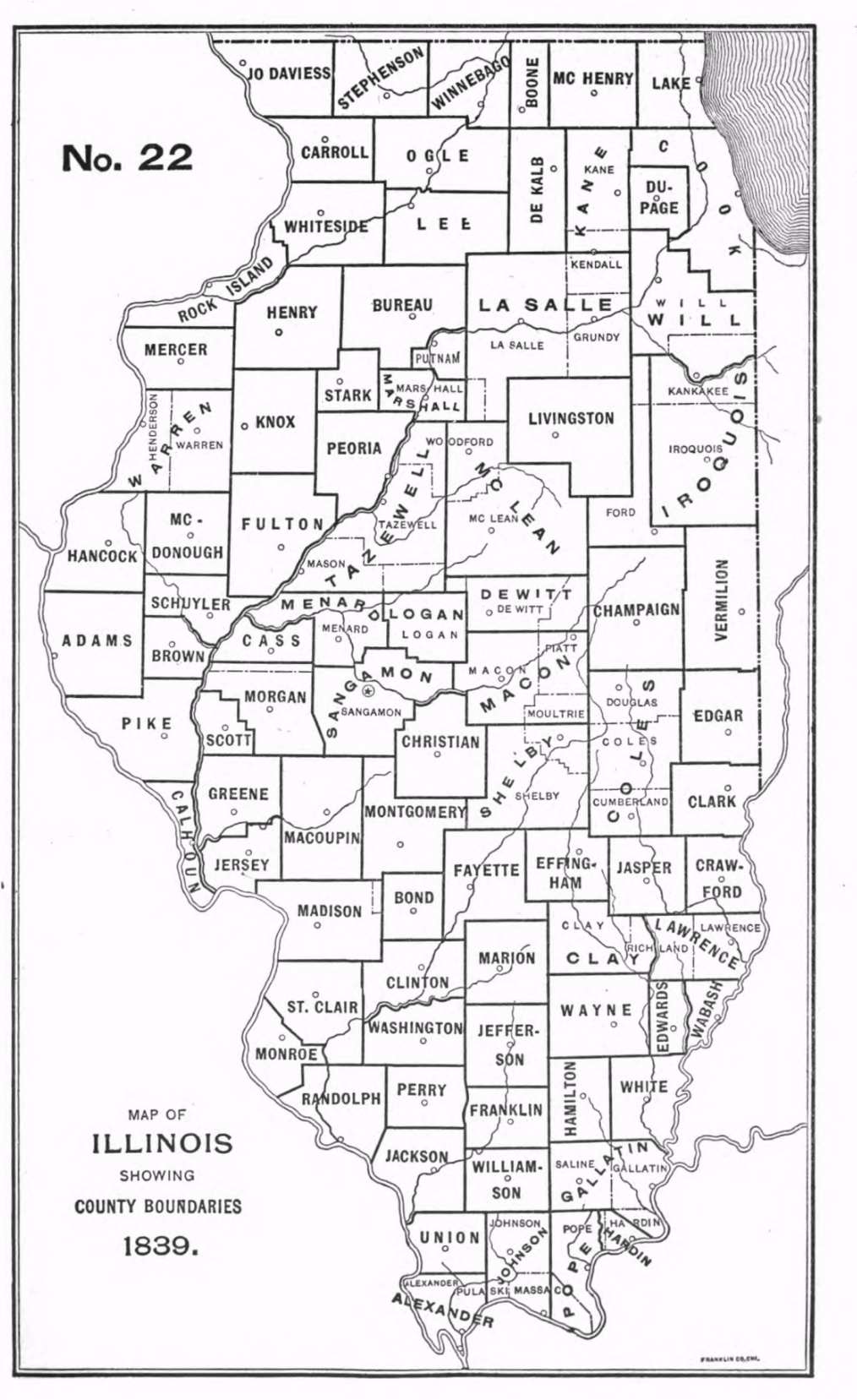
Map of Illinois county boundaries in 1839

== Works cited ==
- Moses, John (1892). Illinois, historical and statistical.
- Blue Book of the State of Illinois. 1919.
- Blue Book of the State of Illinois - Illinois Legislative Roster — 1818-2024 (PDF). 2024. Archived from the original (PDF) on July 15, 2026.
- Pease, Theodore Calvin (1923). Statistical Series: Illinois Election Returns (1818-1848). Vol. 1. Illinois State Historical Library.
