= 10th Illinois General Assembly =

Meeting of the Illinois state legislature from 1836 to 1838

The 10th Illinois General Assembly, consisting of the Illinois Senate and the Illinois House of Representatives, met from December 5, 1836, to March 6, 1837 (1st session) and from July 10, 1837, to July 22, 1837 (2nd session).

The 10th General Assembly was preceded by the 9th Illinois General Assembly, and was succeeded by the 11th Illinois General Assembly.

On January 14, 1836, the ratio of population per Senate seat was fixed at 7,000, and for Representatives at 3,000 resulting in a Senate of forty members and a House of ninety-one members. This arrangement lasted until January 14, 1841, when a new apportionment was made.

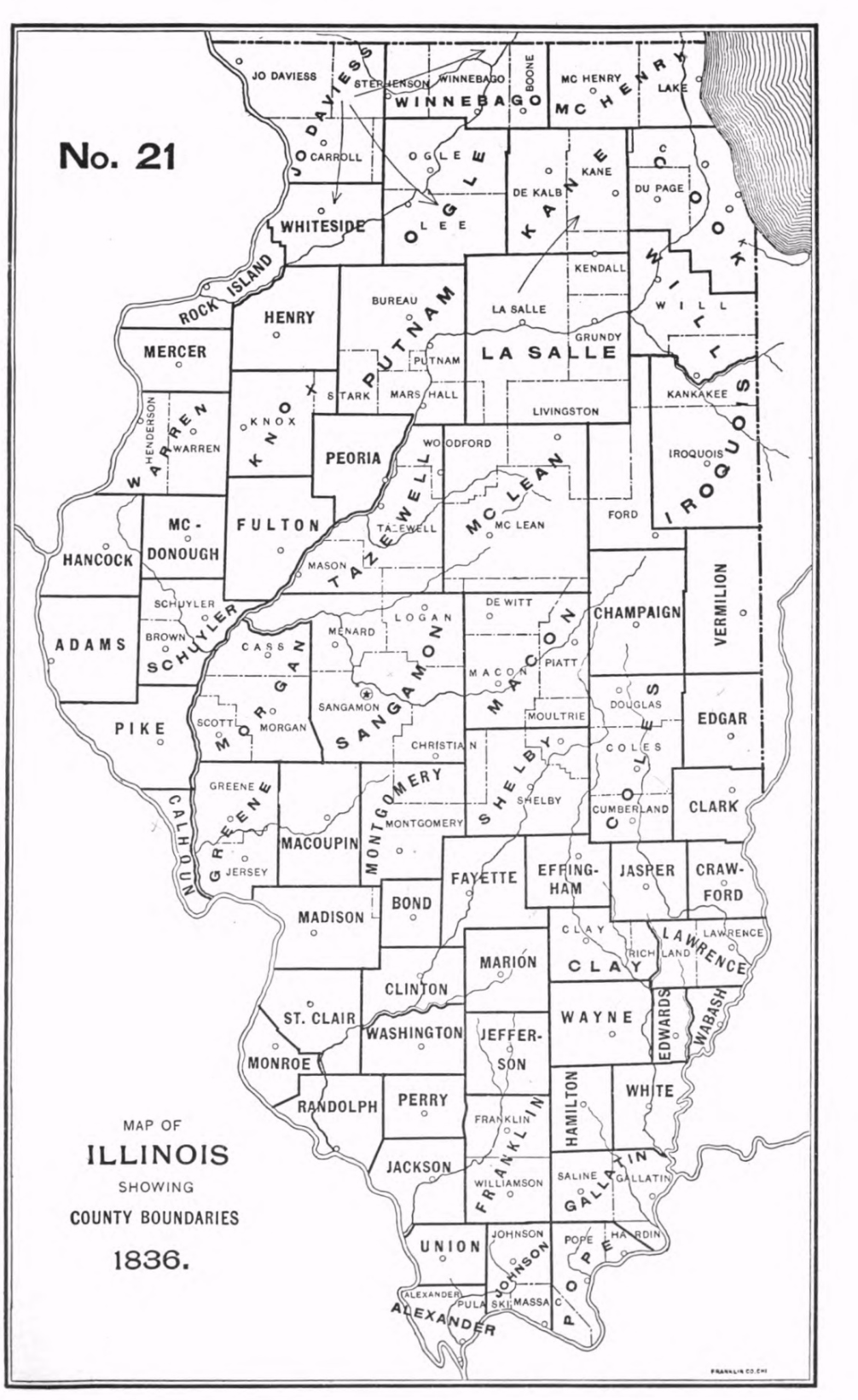
Map of Illinois county boundaries in 1836

== Senate ==
Due to the addition of new counties, the Apportionment Act of 1836 provided that the additional senator from Morgan, and the senators from Cook, Pike, Macoupin, Fulton, La Salle and Iroquois, McLean and Macon, Calhoun and Putnam, Madison and St. Clair and Monroe, Hancock and McDonough, Warren, Knox and Henry, Coles and Clark, and Washington and Perry should be divided by lot into two classes with terms expiring in two and four years respectively. On drawing of 1836, Allen of Greene, Hamlin, Owen, Parker, Ross, Stadden, and Wood drew in the two year class; and Allen of Macon, Borough, Butler, Hackelton, O'Rear, Pruyne, and Whiteside of Monroe drew in the four year class.

County(ies) Represented	Image	Senator	Term	Remarks
McLean • Macon		James Allen	1836–1840	
Greene • Calhoun		John Allen	1836–1838	
Cinton • Marion		Benjamin Bond	1834–1838	
Macoupin		Joseph Borough	1836–1840	
Adams		Orville H. Browning	1836–1840	
Warren • Knox • Henry		Peter Butler	1836–1840	
Montgomery • Bond		Larkin Craig	1836–1838	
White		William H. Davidson		
Madison		Cyrus Edwards		
Sangamon		Job Fletcher		
Gallatin		William J. Gatewood		
Union • Alexander		John H. Hacker		
Fulton		Samuel Hackleton	1836–1840	
Peoria • Putnam		John Hamlin	1836–1838	
Sangamon		Archer G. Herndon		
Hamilton • Jefferson		Levin Lane		
Schuyler		George W. P. Maxwell		
Fayette • Effingham • Clay		Robert K. McLaughlin	1836–1838	
Edwards • Wayne • Wabash		Henry I. Mills		
Tazewell		Benjamin Mitchell		
Madison • St. Clair • Monroe		James B. Moore		Succeeded John D. Whiteside who resigned.
St. Clair		John Murray		
Edgar		Lunsford R. Noel		
Morgan		William O'Rear	1836–1840	
McDonough • Hancock		Thomas H. Owen	1836–1838	
Franklin • Jackson		Braxton Parish		
Clark • Coles		Nathaniel Parker	1836–1838	
Cook • Will		Peter Pruyne	1836–1840	
Lawrence • Crawford • Jasper		John C. Reilly		
Jasper		William Ross	1836–1838	
Randolph		Richard B. Servant		
LaSalle • Kane • Iroquois		William Stadden	1836–1838	
Morgan		William Thomas		
Greene		James Turney	1836–1840	
Vermillion • Champaign		John W. Vance		
Shelby		Peter Warren		
Morgan		William Weatherford		
Pope • Johnson		James A. Whiteside		
Madison • St. Clair • Monroe		John D. Whiteside	1836–1840	Resigned March 6, 1837. Succeeded by James B. Moore
Jo Daviess • Rock Island • Mercer		Augustus G. S. Wight		
Washington • Perry		John D. Wood	1836–1838	

== House of Representatives ==
Seats in County	Counties represented	Image	Representative	Remarks
1	Alexander		Wilson Able	
1	Union		John Dougherty	
1	Johnson		Benjamin S. Enloe	Resigned
1	Johnson		James Copeland	Won a special election held July 1, 1837 to succeed Enloe
1	Pope		Jonathan Diarman	
3	Gallatin		John A. McClernand	Resigned
3	Gallatin		Tarlton Dunn	Won a special election held July 1, 1837 to succeed McClernand
3	Gallatin		Daniel Wood	
3	Gallatin		Resolve Graham	Died December 27, 1836
3	Gallatin		Joseph E. Watkins	Won a special election held July 1, 1837 to succeed Graham
2	Franklin		Achilles D. Dollins	
2	Franklin		Dempsey Odam	
1	Jackson		John Logan	
1	Washington		John Crain	
1	Perry		Richard G. Murphy	
2	Randolph		James Shields	
2	Randolph		Samuel G. Thompson	
3	St. Clair		John Stuntz	
3	St. Clair		William Moore	
3	St. Clair		Joseph Green	
3	Madison		Robert Smith	
3	Madison		James Semple	
3	Madison		John Hogan	
1	Monroe		David Nowlin	Died February 1, 1837
1	Monroe		John A. Sommerville	Won a special election held July 1, 1837 to succeed Nowlin
1	Clinton		Joseph Huey	
1	Bond		Richard Bentley	
1	Macoupin		John Harris	
1	Montgomery		Easton Whitten	
3	Greene		Franklin Witt	
3	Greene		Cyrus A. Davis	
3	Greene		Reville W. English	
1	Hamilton		Milton Carpenter	
1	Jefferson		Harvey T. Pace	
1	Edwards		Thomas Hunt	
1	Wayne		Daniel Turney	
1	Wabash		Edward Smith	
2	Fayette · Effingham		John Dement	Resigned
2	Fayette · Effingham		William Lee D. Ewing	Won a special election held July 1, 1837 to succeed Dement
2	Fayette · Effingham		William J. Hankins	
1	Clay		Peter Green	
2	Tazewell		Richard N. Cullom	
2	Tazewell		Robert Stuart	
2	White		Edwin B. Webb	
2	White		John McCown	
1	Lawrence		Jesse K. DuBois	
1	Lawrence		Edward J. O'Neille	
1	Crawford · Jasper		Wilson LaGow	
1	Clark		William B. Marrs	
2	Coles		Usher F. Linder	Resigned
2	Coles		James T. Cunningham	Won a special election held July 1, 1837 to succeed Linder
2	Coles		Alexander P. Dunbar	
3	Vermilion		George Barnett	
3	Vermilion		George Scarborough	
3	Vermilion		John H. Murphy	
1	Champaign		James H. Lyons	
7	Sangamon		Abraham Lincoln	
7	Sangamon		William F. Elkin	
7	Sangamon		Ninian W. Edwards	
7	Sangamon		John Dawson	
7	Sangamon		Daniel Stone	Resigned
7	Sangamon		Edward D. Baker	Won a special election held July 1, 1837 to succeed Stone
7	Sangamon		Robert L. Wilson	
7	Sangamon		Andrew McCormick	
6	Morgan		Newton Cloud	
6	Morgan		Stephen A. Douglas	Resigned
6	Morgan		John Wyatt	Won a special election held July 1, 1837 to succeed Douglas
6	Morgan		Joseph Morton	
6	Morgan		John J. Hardin	
6	Morgan		Richard S. Walker	
6	Morgan		William W. Happy	
2	McLean		John Moore	
2	McLean		George Henshaw	
2	Adams		George Galbreath	Died
2	Adams		Archibald Williams	Won a special election held July 1, 1837 to succeed Galbreath
2	Adams		James H. Ralston	
2	Pike		Alpheus Wheeler	
2	Pike		Parvin Paullen	
1	Macon		William G. Reddick	
2	Schuyler		William A. Richardson	
2	Schuyler		William A. Minshall	
2	Fulton		Jonas Rawalt	
2	Fulton		Asel F. Ball	
1	McDonough		William Edmonston	
1	Hancock		Mark Aldrich	
1	Warren · Knox		William McMurtry	
3	Cook · Will		Joseph Naper	
3	Cook · Will		James Walker	
3	Cook · Will		Albert G. Leary	
1	LaSalle		Henry Madden	
1	Iroquois		Isaac Courtright	
1	Peoria		Francis Voris	
1	Calhoun · Greene		William Lane	Resigned
1	Calhoun · Greene		John Green	Won a special election held July 1, 1837 to succeed Lane
2	Jo Daviess · Mercer · Rock Island · Winnebago		James Craig	
2	Jo Daviess · Mercer · Rock Island · Winnebago		Elijah Charles	Resigned
2	Jo Daviess · Mercer · Rock Island · Winnebago		Samuel M. Bartlett	Won a special election held July 1, 1837 to succeed Charles. Three new counties were added to the district at the same time: Boone, Ogle, and Stephenson
1	Shelby		John S. Turley	
2	Edgar		Gideon Minor	
2	Edgar		Augustus C. French	Resigned
2	Edgar		Samuel Connelly	Won a special election held July 1, 1837 to succeed
1	Putnam		Thomas Atwater	
1	Marion		William Davidson	

== Works cited ==
- Moses, John (1892). Illinois, historical and statistical.
- Blue Book of the State of Illinois. 1919.
- Blue Book of the State of Illinois - Illinois Legislative Roster — 1818-2024 (PDF). 2024. Archived from the original (PDF) on July 15, 2026.
- Laws of the State of Illinois passed by the ninth general assembly : at their second session, commencing December 7, 1835, and ending January 18, 1836. J. Y. Sawyer Public Printer. 1836. pp. 268–270.
- Pease, Theodore Calvin (1923). Statistical Series: Illinois Election Returns (1818-1848). Vol. 1. Illinois State Historical Library.
