= 9th Illinois General Assembly =

Meeting of the Illinois state legislature from 1834 to 1836

The 9th Illinois General Assembly, consisting of the Illinois Senate and the Illinois House of Representatives, met from December 1, 1834 to February 13, 1835 (1st session) and from December 7, 1835 to January 18, 1836 (2nd session).

The 9th General Assembly was preceded by the 8th Illinois General Assembly, and was succeeded by the 10th Illinois General Assembly.

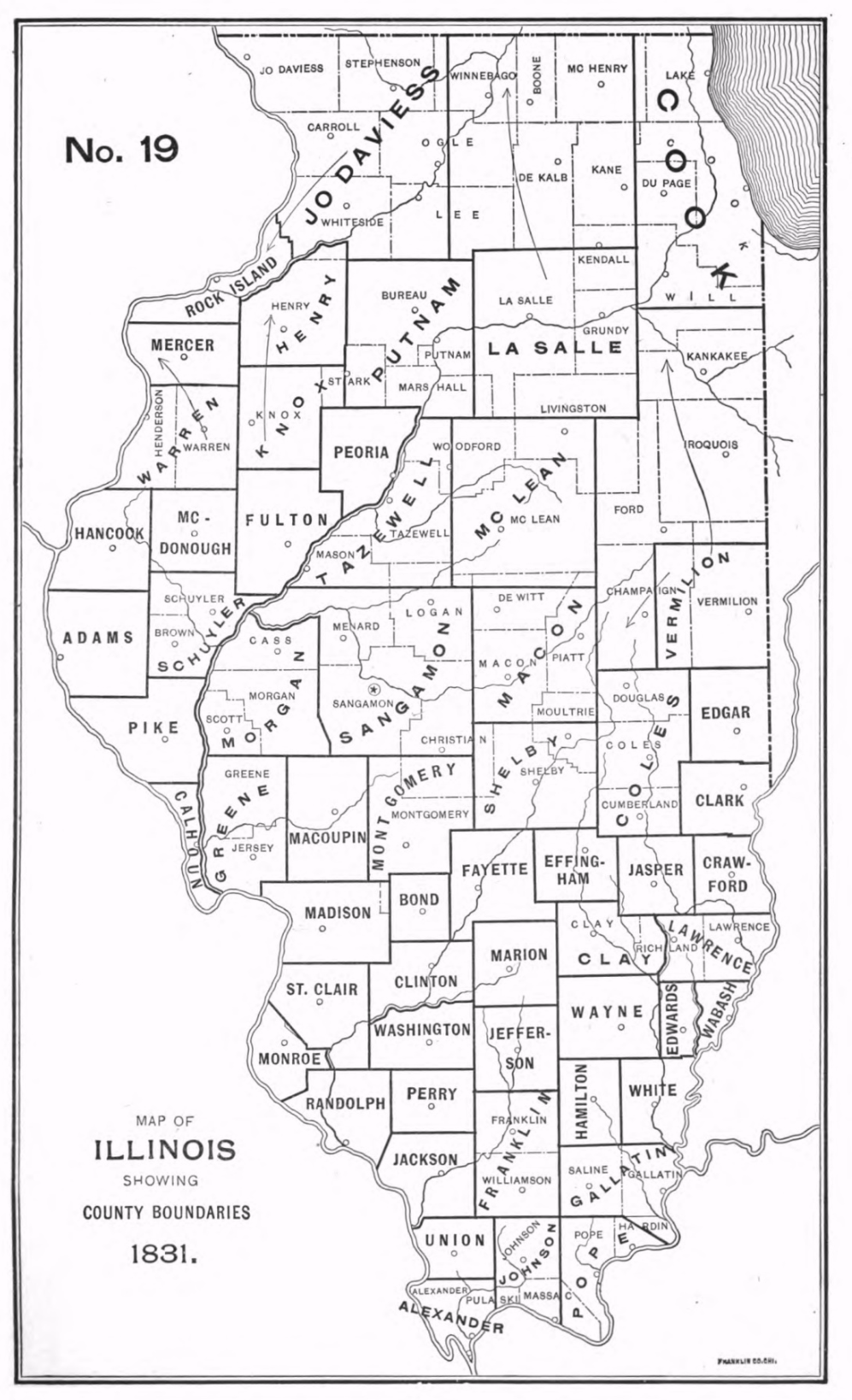
Map of Illinois county boundaries in 1831

== Senate ==
Seats in Jurisdiction	County(ies) Represented	Image	Senator	Term	Remarks
1	Clinton • Monroe		Benjamin Bond	1834–1838	
1	Bond • Macoupin • Montgomery		Larkin Craig		
1	White		William H. Davidson		
1	Madison		Cyrus Edwards		
1	Clay • Fayette • Marion		William L. D. Ewing		Resigned in December 1835 after the death of U.S. Senator Elias Kane. Ewing was appointed by Governor Joseph Duncan to serve out the rest of Kane's term in the U.S. Senate.
2	Sangamon		George Forquer		Resigned January 30, 1835
2	Sangamon		Edmund D. Taylor		Resigned after being appointed in 1835 by President Andrew Jackson as Receiver of Public Moneys in Chicago
2	Sangamon		Job Fletcher		Fletcher and Herndon were elected in Special Election held August 3, 1835 to replace Edmund D. Taylor and George Forquer who both resigned.
2	Sangamon		Archer G. Herndon		Fletcher and Herndon were elected in Special Election held August 3, 1835 to replace Edmund D. Taylor and George Forquer who both resigned.
1	Gallatin		William J. Gatewood		
1	Union • Alexander		John S. Hacker		
1	Hamilton • Jefferson		Levin Lane		
1	Randolph • Perry		Thomas Mather		Resigned on May 11, 1835 to take the role of President at the recently chartered State Bank of Illinois. Succeeded by Richard B. Servant
1	Randolph • Perry		Richard B. Servant		Succeeded Thomas Mather who resigned after Special Election held August 3, 1835
1	Schuyler • Fulton • Henry • Knox • Calhoun • McDonough • Warren • Mercer		George W. P. Maxwell		
1	Crawford • Lawrence		David McGahey		
1	Edwards • Wabash • Wayne		Henry I. Mills		
1	McLean • Tazewell		Benjamin Mitchell		
1	Edgar • Clark • Coles		Lunsford R. Noel		
1	Greene		Thomas Rattan		
1	St. Clair		Adam W. Snyder		
1	Jo Daviess • Cook • LaSalle • Putnam • Peoria • Rock Island		Jason W. Stephenson		Resigned
1	Jo Daviess • Cook • LaSalle • Putnam • Peoria • Rock Island		James M. Strode		Succeeded Jason W. Stephenson who resigned.
2	Morgan		William Thomas		
2	Morgan		Waller Jones†		Died
2	Morgan		William Weatherford		Replaced Waller Jones who died in office
1	Vermillion • Champaign • Iroquois		John W. Vance		
1	Pope • Johnson		James A. Whiteside		
1	Jackson • Franklin • Washington		Conrad Will†		Died in office
1	Jackson • Franklin • Washington		Braxton Parrish		Elected in Special Election on August 3, 1835 to replace Conrad Will
1	Pike • Hancock • Adams		Archibald Williams		
1	Shelby • Macon		William Williamson		

== House of Representatives ==
Seats in County	Counties represented	Image	Representative	Remarks
1	Alexander		Wilson Able	
1	Union		John Dougherty	Resigned
1	Union		Bazil B. Craig	Replaced Dougherty after special election held August 3, 1835
1	Johnson		John Oliver	
1	Pope		Charles Dunn	
2	Gallatin		Stephen R. Rowan	Resigned
2	Gallatin		Daniel Wood	Replaced Rowan after special election held August 3, 1835
2	Gallatin		James Hampton	
2	Franklin · Washington		Johnston Wren	
2	Franklin · Washington		George P. Boyer	
1	Jackson		James Harreld	
2	Randolph · Perry		John Thompson	
2	Randolph · Perry		Richard G. Murphy	
2	St. Clair		John D. Hughes	
2	St. Clair		William Moore	
2	Madison		James Semple	
2	Madison		Jesse B. Thomas Jr.	Resigned
2	Madison		Nathaniel Buckmaster	Replaced Thomas after special election held August 3, 1835
1	Monroe		John D. Whiteside	
1	Clinton		James Outhouse	
1	Bond		William Hunter	
1	Macoupin		John Harris	
1	Montgomery		Christian B. Blockburger	
3	Greene		Lewis W. Link	Resigned
3	Greene		James Turney	Replaced Link after special election held August 3, 1835
3	Greene		Calvin Tunnel	
3	Greene		Charles Gregory	
1	Hamilton		Milton Carpenter	
1	Jefferson		Stinson H. Anderson	Resigned
1	Jefferson		Harvey T. Pace	Replaced Anderson after special election held August 3, 1835
1	Edwards		Thomas Hunt	
1	Wayne		Benjamin A. Clark	
1	Wabash		Orlando B. Ficklin	Resigned
1	Wabash		Edward Smith	Replaced Ficklin after special election held August 3, 1835
1	Fayette		Robert Blackwell	
1	Tazewell · McLean		William Brown	
2	White		Edwin B. Webb	
2	White		William McHenry	Died in office
2	White		Nathaniel Blackford	Replaced McHenry after special election held August 3, 1835
1	Lawrence		Jesse K. DuBois	
1	Crawford		James D. McGahey	Resigned
1	Crawford		David Porter	Replaced McGahey after special election held August 3, 1835
1	Clark		Uri Manly	
1	Coles		James T. Cunningham	
2	Vermilion · Champaign · Iroquois		Asa Elliott	
2	Vermilion · Champaign · Iroquois		William Fithian	
4	Sangamon		John Dawson	
4	Sangamon		Abraham Lincoln	
4	Sangamon		William Carpenter	
4	Sangamon		John T. Stuart	
4	Morgan		John Henry	
4	Morgan		Newton Cloud	
4	Morgan		John Wyatt	
4	Morgan		William Gordon	
2	Hancock · Pike · Adams		William Ross	
2	Hancock · Pike · Adams		Thomas H. Owen	
1	Schuyler		Jacob Vandeventer	
1	Fulton · Knox · Henry		Samuel Hackleton	
1	Calhoun · McDonough · Warren · Mercer		Peter Butler	
1	Cook · Jo Daviess · LaSalle · Peoria · Putnam · Rock Island		John Hamlin	
1	Shelby · Macon		Thomas B. Trower	
1	Edgar		Nelson W. Nunnally	
1	Marion · Clay		Elijah S. Frazier	General election resulted in a tie between Frazier and incumbent William Marshall. Special election held September 22, 1834 resulted in Frazier's victory.

== Works cited ==
- Moses, John (1892). Illinois, historical and statistical.
- Blue Book of the State of Illinois. 1919.
- Blue Book of the State of Illinois - Illinois Legislative Roster — 1818-2024 (PDF). 2024. Archived from the original (PDF) on July 15, 2026.
- Pease, Theodore Calvin (1923). Statistical Series: Illinois Election Returns (1818-1848). Vol. 1. Illinois State Historical Library.
