= 11th Illinois General Assembly =

Meeting of the Illinois state legislature from 1838 to 1840

The 11th Illinois General Assembly, consisting of the Illinois Senate and the Illinois House of Representatives, met from December 3, 1838, to March 4, 1839 (1st session) and from December 9, 1839, to February 3, 1840 (2nd session).

The 11th General Assembly was preceded by the 10th Illinois General Assembly, and was succeeded by the 12th Illinois General Assembly.

On January 14, 1836, during the 9th Illinois General Assembly, the ratio of population per Senate seat was fixed at 7,000, and for Representatives at 3,000 resulting in a Senate of forty members and a House of ninety-one members. This arrangement lasted until January 14, 1841, when a new apportionment was made.

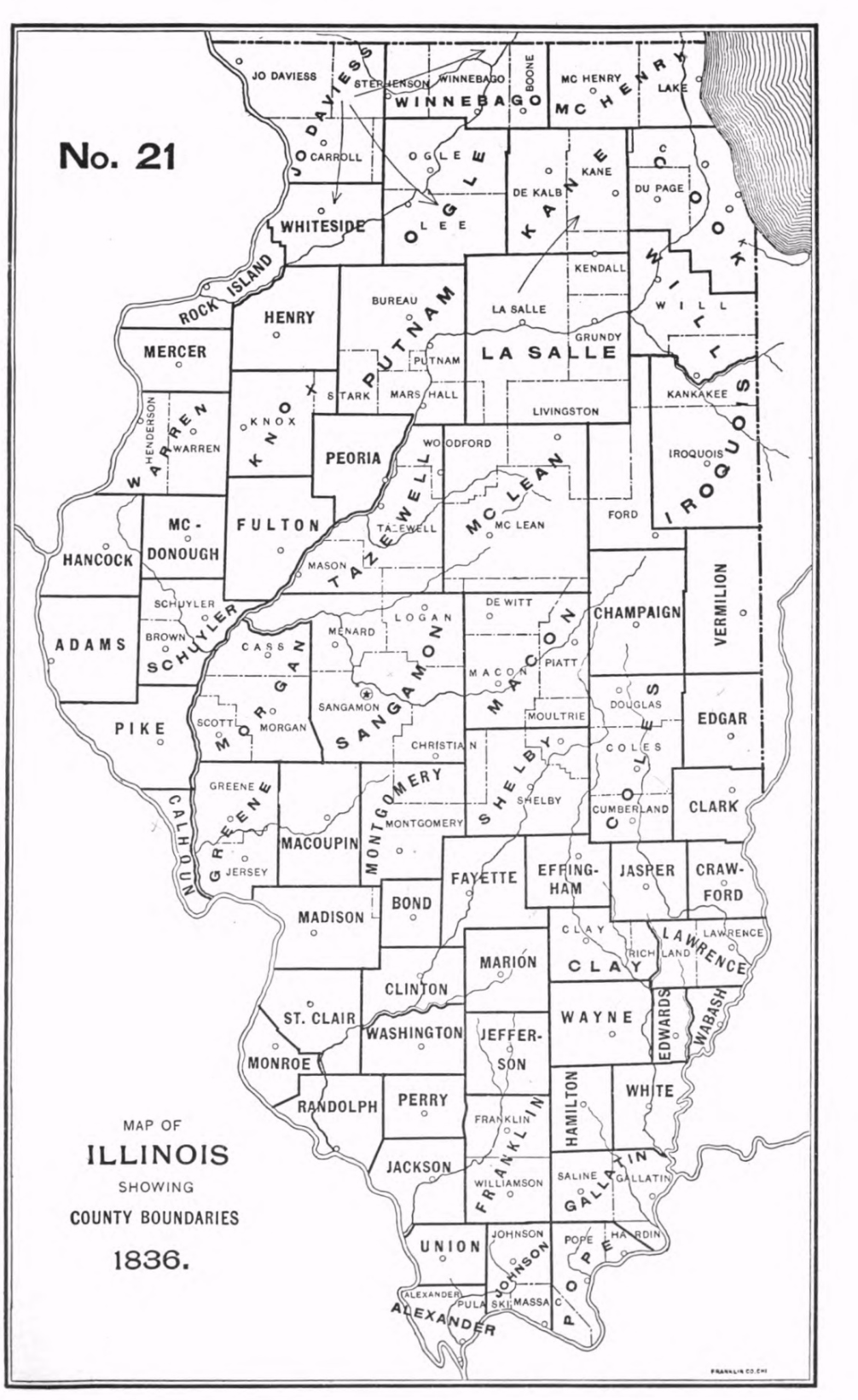
Map of Illinois county boundaries in 1836

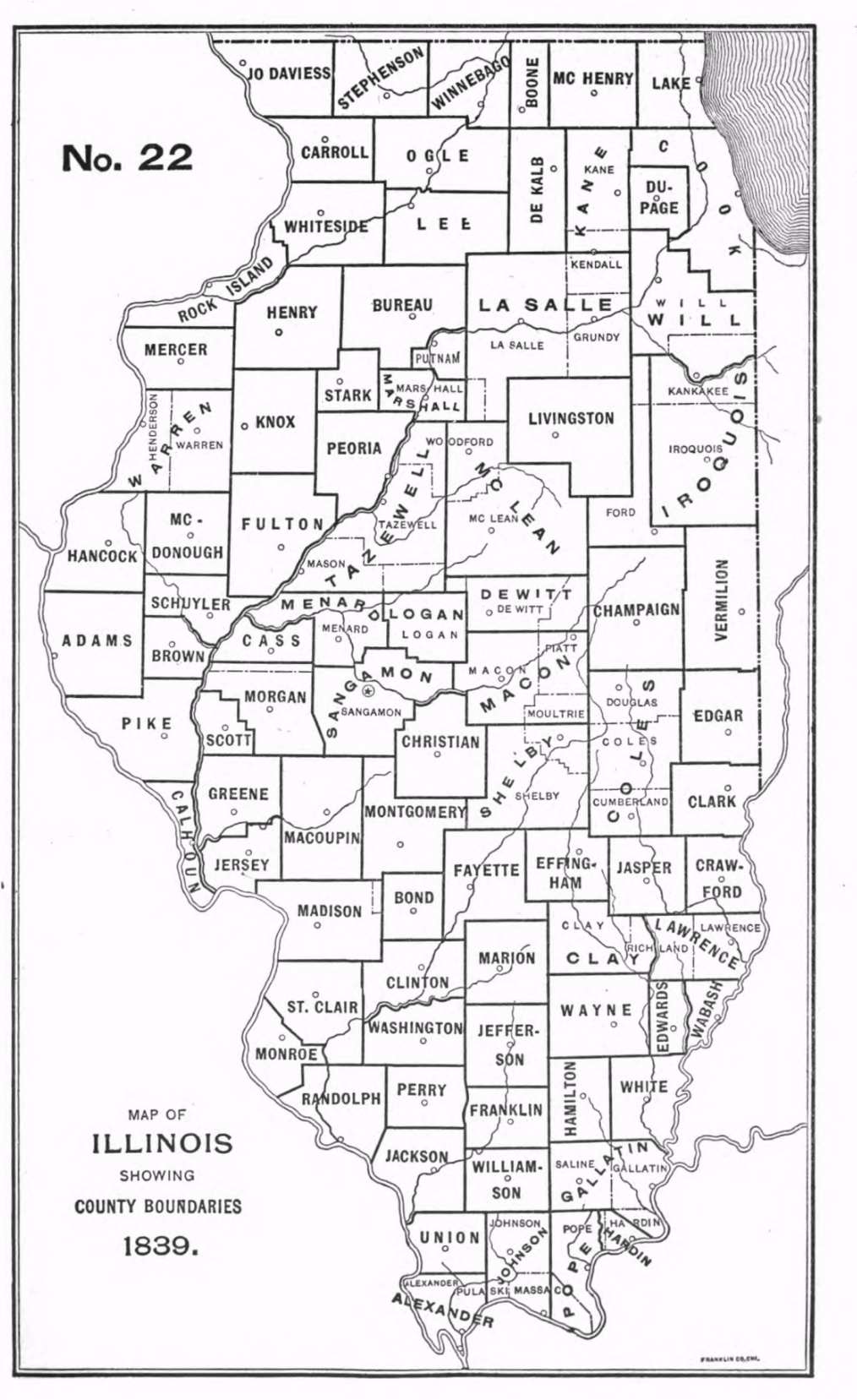
Map of Illinois county boundaries in 1839

== Senate ==
Seats in District	Counties in District	Image	Senator	Remarks
1	Alexander · Union		John S. Hacker	
1	Johnson · Pope		Worthington J. Gibbs	
1	Gallatin		William J. Gatewood	
1	Hamilton · Jefferson		Noah Johnson	
1	Franklin · Jackson		Braxton Parrish	
1	Washington · Perry		John D. Wood	
1	White		William H. Davidson	
1	Edwards · Wayne · Wabash		Henry I. Mills	
1	Lawrence · Crawford · Jasper		Abner Greer	
1	Edgar		Nelson W. Nunnally	
1	Coles · Clark		Byrd Monroe	
1	Vermillion · Champaign		William Fithian	
1	Madison		George Churchill	
1	St. Clair		John Murray	
1	Monroe · Madison · St. Clair		James B. Moore	This jurisdiction is in addition to the individual senators representing Madison and St. Clair counties.
1	Randolph		Richard B. Servant	
1	Clinton · Marion		William Gaston	
1	Bond · Montgomery		William Hunter	
1	Fayette · Effingham · Clay		R. Blackwell	
1	Shelby		Peter Warren	
1	Greene		James Turney	Resigned
1	Greene		Manoah Bostwick	Replaced Turney after winning a special election held November 25, 1839
1	Calhoun · Greene		Franklin Witt	This jurisdiction is in addition to the individual senator representing Greene county.
1	Macoupin		Joseph Borough	
3	Morgan		William O'Rear	
3	Morgan		William Thomas	Resigned
3	Morgan		William L. Sergeant	Replaced O'Rear
3	Morgan		William B. Weatherford	
2	Sangamon		Job Fletcher	
2	Sangamon		Arthur G. Herndon	
1	Tazewell		Benjamin Mitchell	
1	McLean · Macon		James Allen	
1	Adams		Orville H. Browning	
1	Pike		William Ross	
1	Schuyler		William A. Richardson	
1	Fulton		Samuel Hackleton	Resigned
1	Fulton		David Markley	Replaced Hackleton
1	McDonough · Hancock		Sidney H. Little	
1	Warren · Knox · Henry		Peter Butler	
1	Cook		Ebenezer Peck	Resigned
1	Cook		James H. Woodworth	
1	LaSalle · Iroquois		William Stadden	
1	Putnam · Peoria		John Hamlin	
1	Jo Daviess · Mercer · Rock Island		George W. Harrison	

== Works cited ==
- Moses, John (1892). Illinois, historical and statistical.
- Blue Book of the State of Illinois. 1919.
- Blue Book of the State of Illinois - Illinois Legislative Roster — 1818-2024 (PDF). 2024. Archived from the original (PDF) on July 15, 2026.
- Pease, Theodore Calvin (1923). Statistical Series: Illinois Election Returns (1818-1848). Vol. 1. Illinois State Historical Library.
- Laws of the State of Illinois passed by the ninth general assembly : at their second session, commencing December 7, 1835, and ending January 18, 1836. J. Y. Sawyer Public Printer. 1836. pp. 268–270.
