= Lynette Lombard =

American painter

Lynette Lombard (December 13, 1953 – November 8, 2023) was an American landscape painter. She was a perceptual painter interested in the territory between figuration and abstraction. Her work was deeply informed by Expressionism and influenced by artists including El Greco, Chaïm Soutine, and Philip Guston.

== Life ==
Lombard was born in Newton, Massachusetts. She grew up in the Boston suburbs, and after finishing high school at the Ethel Walker School in Connecticut, she lived for a year in Paris and took courses at the École des Beaux Arts. She earned a B.A. Honours from Goldsmiths, University of London. She relocated to New York City in the 1980s, where she attended the New York Studio School for two years before completing her M.F.A. at Yale University. Lombard met her spouse, Tony Gant, at Yale. Gant, also an artist, worked with Lombard. The couple held joint shows for their work in galleries in the Midwest and New York City. Lombard and Gant painted in Spain near the Mediterranean during summers. The location is featured in some of Lombard's landscapes.

Lombard taught at Knox College in Galesburg, Illinois, from 1990 to 2023, where she was the Chancie Ferris Booth Professor of Art. She also taught at the Chautauqua Institution School of Art, the Ox-Bow School of Art and Artists Residency, and the Mount Gretna School of Art.

== Work ==
As a landscape painter, Lombard explored experiences of place and the natural environment in her art. Lombard's painting style existed in the space between pure abstraction and detailed figuration. Describing her work, Lombard said: "What I want to get hold of is that slow unfolding as an image opens up and allows for a space of contemplation. In that space sensations and memories merge, connections and meanings are revealed. It is where the fragile and sometimes disturbing become actual and tangible and conjure a spirit of place."

The painter Peter Acheson wrote about the 2017 Crossroads exhibition at Sideshow Gallery, in Brooklyn, New York: "Lombard's landscapes seek to reinsert specific landscapes, emotionally significant to the artist, into dramatic situations of color, as if she had one moment, only a few seconds long to sum up her feelings, perform her passions."

Art critic Jennifer Samet described Lombard's landscape paintings as "urgent — not pastoral or nostalgic" and "about what it means to be present in that landscape, watching and living an environment at risk."

Describing her work as a form of environmental activism, Lombard has said: "The ideas of disconnection and distancing from our environments continues to lead to the environmental disasters we are seeing across the world today and in this sense, as a landscape painter, I see my work as a form of activism."

Museums and galleries that have exhibited Lombard's work include Pennsylvania College of Art & Design, Rider University, Lohin Geduld Gallery, The Painting Center, and Westbeth Artists Community Gallery in New York City; Artemisia Gallery in Chicago; the Figge Art Museum in Davenport, Iowa; the Lakeview Museum of Arts and Sciences and Peoria Riverfront Museum in Peoria, Illinois; the Museum of Modern Art in Mojacar, Spain; La Barquilla Gallery in Sorbas, Spain; and Newtownbarry House in Bunclody, Ireland.

Lombard's work is represented by Bowery Gallery in New York City, the Midwest Paint Group, and the Confluence Collective in Spain.
