= Edward Smith (Illinois politician) =

American politician

Member of the Illinois House of Representatives
- In office August 3, 1835 – 1840

Edward Smith was an American politician who served as a member of the Illinois House of Representatives. He served as a state representative representing Wabash County in the 9th, 10th, and 11th Illinois General Assemblies.
