= Senator Cloud =

Senator Cloud may refer to:

- Heather Cloud (fl. 2020s), Louisiana State Senate
- Newton Cloud (1804–1877), Illinois State Senate
