= Senator Hamlin (disambiguation) =

Hannibal Hamlin (1809–1891) was a U.S. senator from Maine from 1869 to 1881. Senator Hamlin may also refer to:

- Elijah Hamlin (1800–1872), Maine State Senate
- Hannibal E. Hamlin (1858–1938), Maine State Senate
- John Hamlin (1800–1876), Illinois State Senate
