= Samuel D. Lockwood =

American lawyer and politician (1789–1874)

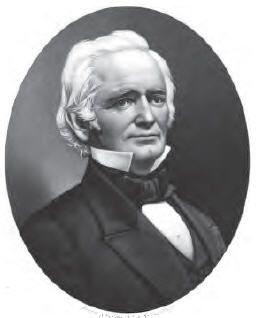

3rd Illinois Attorney General
- In office 1821–1822
- Governor: Shadrach Bond
- Preceded by: William Mears
- Succeeded by: James Turney

2nd Secretary of State of Illinois
- In office 1822–1823
- Governor: Edward Coles
- Preceded by: Elias Kane
- Succeeded by: David Blackwell

Illinois Supreme Court Justice
- In office 1824–1848

Personal details
- Born: August 2, 1789 Pound Ridge, New York, U.S.
- Died: April 23, 1874 (aged 84) Batavia, Illinois, U.S.
- Party: Whig
- Other political affiliations: Republican Party
- Spouse: Mary Stith Nash
- Children: 3
- Profession: Lawyer, judge

Samuel Drake Lockwood (August 2, 1789 – April 23, 1874) was an Illinois lawyer and politician who served as the state's Attorney General, Secretary of State, Justice of the Illinois Supreme Court and the state's trustee on the board of the Illinois Central Railroad.

== Early and family life ==
Lockwood was born in Poundridge, New York. His father, Joseph Lockwood (1764-1799), was an innkeeper who died of yellow fever (as did his infant son Cornelius) when Samuel was ten. His mother, Mary (1765-1819), was the daughter of Col. Samuel Drake and would remarry after about a year, to Duncan McCall. Samuel was the oldest of Lockwood's four children, and would be sent to boarding school in New Jersey with his brother Jesse Close Lockwood (b.1791), when his mother moved to Canada with her new husband and young daughter Rebecca (1792-1827; who would marry Jacob Potts in Canada).

The Lockwood boys only remained in that school for a few months before their uncle, Francis Drake, assumed responsibility for them. Samuel studied law with Drake and was admitted to the bar in Batavia, New York in 1811.

In 1826 Lockwood married Virginia-born Mary V. S. Nash (1800-1875), who would survive him by less than a year. They had four daughters. By 1850, Lockwood also had two 20-year-old male clerks living with his family and sharing his last name (R.A. Lockwood and J. Lockwood), so he may have repaid his uncle's tutelage of himself and his brother by raising other young relatives.

== Law career ==
Lockwood had practiced law in Batavia, the seat of Genesee County, New York for a year before relocating his practice somewhat eastward. He then practiced in Sempronius, Cayuga County, New York for about a year and a half. From 1815 until August 1818, he had a law partnership in nearby Auburn, New York with George B. Throop. Lockwood ended that practice when he decided to move westward to the new state of Illinois.

In 1818, he and a friend, William H. Brown, took a flatboat and descended the Allegheny River into the Ohio River before disembarking at Shawneetown, Gallatin County, Illinois. They walked across the new state to Kaskaskia, the first capital, but Lockwood returned to the "Little Egypt" region and settled in Carmi, White County, Illinois. He moved to Edwardsville around 1823, when he accepted the federal revenue collector job discussed below. Lockwood purchased land further north in Morgan County in central Illinois in 1828, and further land when such became available in the 1830s. He lived in Morgan County for more than two decades. Lockwood would move further north following his judicial retirement, and finally settled with his family in Batavia, Kane County, Illinois in 1853.

== Political career ==
In 1821, Illinois voters elected Lockwood the young state's third Attorney General. During his brief tenure in that office, Lockwood successfully prosecuted the only known duel to come to trial in Illinois. He resigned after only a year when Governor Edward Coles appointed him as Secretary of State after Illinois' first Secretary of State, Elias Kane, was elected to the Illinois House of Representatives. Three months later, Lockwood received an appointment as the Receiver of Public Moneys from President James Monroe; the job involved receiving money for settlers buying public lands from the federal government, and Coles had previously held the job. One of the reasons Lockwood accepted continued appointment from Madison was that it would afford him the time and money to ensure that Illinois would remain a free state, although both Presidents were slave owners. Like Governor Coles, Lockwood resisted slavery advocates (particularly from "Little Egypt") who wanted another Constitutional Convention to adopt a pro-slavery Constitution for the state; voters rejected the proposed convention in April 1824.

Meanwhile, after various native American tribes ceded land in the 1821 Treaty of Chicago, northern Illinois was developing. In 1824, Lockwood was appointed to the First Board of Canal Commissioners, and became responsible for contracting with engineers to survey the route of the Illinois and Michigan Canal. Planned since 1818, it would connect the Great Lakes (through the soon-to-be-incorporated town of Chicago at the confluence of Lake Michigan and the Chicago River) to the Mississippi River (and the transportation hubs of St. Louis, Missouri and New Orleans, Louisiana) via the Illinois River in the state's central section. The route was surveyed in the following years, and the first land grants delivered (or bought) in 1827.

== Judicial and later career ==
In late 1824, the state legislature reorganized the Illinois Supreme Court and the outgoing Governor Coles appointed Lockwood a judge on that Court, with the legislature's approval. Judge Lockwood took office on January 19, 1825 (as perhaps its only anti-slavery member) and served until December 1848. Early on, Lockwood revised the Illinois Criminal Code, and he resigned after the 1848 Constitution (which he helped draft and supported) reduced the Court's membership to three judges. The Court had also reorganized in 1841, after which Lockwood became responsible for the first judicial circuit.

In 1837, Lockwood was the only dissenting judge in a case concerning the pre-emption homestead rights of trader Jean Baptiste Beaubien (brought by then fellow Morgan County lawyer Murray McConnell) shortly before the formal closing of Fort Dearborn following the 1833 Treaty of Chicago. The United States Supreme Court would overrule the other Illinois justices in Wilcox v. Jackson in 1839, before the federal government sold the contested land as the "Fort Dearborn Addition" to the town (which had incorporated as a city in 1837).

Several times, Lockwood adjudicated cases involving slaves who claimed freedom based on being brought and/or living in Illinois, as well as to Illinois residents who assisted. He upheld slave status on several occasions, both as a trial and appellate judge, citing "comity" with laws of southern states that permitted slavery, and that the slaves were only traveling through the free state. In Phoebe v Jay, Lockwood, despite his previous anti-convention and abolitionist views, held that the 40 year indenture of Phoebe (entered into in 1814) could be transferred to Joseph Jay's heir, his son William Jay, reasoning that the new state's Constitution superseded the anti-slavery provisions of the Northwest Ordinance. However, Illinois courts began chipping away at the state's Black Code and indenture laws around 1843, led by Judge John D. Caton, who threw out a charge against Owen Lovejoy for harboring "Nancy", a black woman without freedom papers. In 1844, Lockwood was the only dissenter in the case of abolitionist William Hayes for assisting "Sukey", slave of Andrew Borders who moved to Galesburg, kidnapped her two sons from jail and sold them southward, the remaining judges upholding the transaction. In 1845, the Court found Joseph Jarrott not a slave, although his mother Pelagie had been since her purchase in 1798 when she was four years old; it thereafter held that slaves born in Illinois after the Northwest Ordinance were born free (overruling Phoebe v. Jay. Nonetheless, the road to abolition was slow. Lockwood participated in two other underground railroad conductor convictions, of Jacksonville's perhaps most visible abolitionist, Julius Willard and his son Samuel Willard (Illinois' governor Pat Quinn pardoned both posthumously in 2014). Lockwood became one of the framers of Illinois' second Constitution in 1848, representing Morgan County at that assembly. He also served as a trustee of Illinois College and the state insane asylum, also in Jacksonville for several years.

In 1851 Lockwood was appointed the state's trustee on the board of the Illinois Central Railroad. That caused him to move his family to Batavia, Kane County, Illinois (an abolitionist hotpot in Illinois, especially compared to Jacksonville, much less Little Egypt), so he could catch a train to attend board and other meetings in Chicago. Lockwood continued to serve on that board for the rest of his life. With the demise of the Whig Party, and because he remained anti-slavery, Lockwood joined the new Republican Party, whose Presidential candidate in 1860 he knew well from his days in Morgan County and tenure on the Illinois Supreme Court, Abraham Lincoln. In both the 1860 and 1870 federal censuses, Lockwood characterized himself as a farmer in Batavia. President Lincoln characterized Lockwood as "one of the best men in the world" upon receiving a letter from him in December 1864. After the American Civil War, Lockwood also accepted an appointment by Governor Palmer and served on a committee to find a site for an insane asylum in northern Illinois in 1869 (perhaps in part because he was a trustee of the asylum at Jacksonville), at which Mary Todd Lincoln would briefly reside in 1874.,

== Retirement and death ==
Lockwood died at his home in Batavia in 1874, at age 85. After a funeral at the Congregational Church, he was interred in the West Batavia cemetery across from his home (and to which he had donated some land to enable a stone fence). His wife Mary, who died the following year, and 26 descendants would ultimately be buried at that family plot.

Some of his family's papers are held by the Abraham Lincoln Presidential Library. Batavia named a street after Lockwood. His former home, built in 1849 in the Greek Revival Style and locally known as "Lockwood Hall" and later owned by legislator and public welfare director Rodney Brandon, still exists at 825 Batavia Avenue, off State Route 31.

Legal offices
Preceded by William Mears	Illinois Attorney General; 1821–1822	Succeeded by James Turney
Political offices
Preceded by Elias Kane	Secretary of State of Illinois; 1822–1823	Succeeded by David Blackwell
