= Susan E. Cannon Allen =

African-American suffragist (1859–1935)

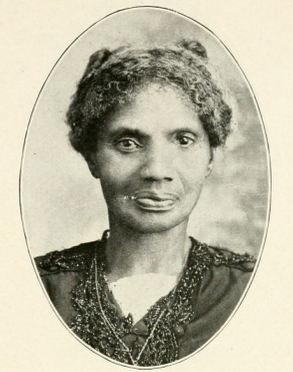
- Born: Susan E. Cannon; May 26, 1859; Galesburg, Illinois, U.S.
- Died: May 12, 1935 (aged 75)
- Known for: Suffragette

Susan E. Cannon Allen (May 26, 1859 – May 12, 1935) was an African-American suffragist and temperance activist from Illinois. She served in numerous executive positions in several different women's clubs and was involved in club work at both the local and state level.

== Personal life and education ==
Cannon Allen was born in Galesburg, Illinois, to James and Clarissa Richardson Cannon, and she was their only daughter. Her great-grandparents, Thomas and Susan Richardson, came to Knox county from Kentucky through the Underground Railroad.

She attended Monmouth schools with the goal of teaching foreign languages but did not end up pursuing that. She instead pursued missionary work in the United Presbyterian Church in Galesburg, Illinois.

She later, in 1877 married John R. Allen which lasted 56 years until he died in 1933. They had twenty children together, only eight of whom survived into adulthood.

== Community and Suffrage Work ==
Susan E. Cannon Allen was passionate about uplifting other African-American people and doing community work. Women's clubs allowed Allen and others to develop leadership skills, advocate for women's rights and racial justice, and serve their communities. From 1910 to 1911 she was vice president of the Autumn Leaf Club which was one of the oldest Colored Women's Club in Illinois, and was located in Galesburg. The Autumn Leaf Club was established in June 1890 by Eva Solomon to raise money for the local Allen Chapel A. M. E. Church. The club was largely community service based and its mission centered on the club motto "love one another." Susan E. Cannon Allen was one of the original twenty four chartering members.

She helped to found the Woman's Progressive Club in 1909 alongside twenty four other women. Susan was trustee, steward and the president of the club. As a club they mostly did charity work for the elderly and the poor.

== Death ==
She died on May 12, 1935, in her family home at 1412 Mulberry Street following a year old illness.
