= Benjamin Bond =

American politician

Member of the Illinois Senate
- In office 1834–1838

Benjamin Bond was an American politician who served as a member of the Illinois Senate. He served as a state senator representing Clinton and Monroe counties in the 9th and 10th Illinois General Assemblies.
