= Jimmy Shields =

Jimmy Shields may refer to:

- Jimmy Shields (baseball) (1905–1963), American Negro league baseball player
- Jimmy Shields (curler) (1929–1996), Canadian curler, 1968 World champion
- Jimmy Shields (footballer) (1931–2020), for Southampton and Northern Ireland
- Jimmy Shields (journalist) (1900–1949), British communist activist and newspaper editor
- Jimmie Shields (1905–1974), American interior designer and film actor the longtime companion of William Haines

== See also ==
- James Shields (disambiguation)
