= Joseph Borough =

American politician

Member of the Illinois State Senate
- In office 1836–1840

Member of the Illinois House of Representatives
- In office 1832–1834

Member of the Illinois House of Representatives
- In office 1820–1822

Joseph Borough was an American politician who served as a member of the Illinois House of Representatives and of the Illinois State Senate.

Borough was a member of the First Illinois Constitutional Convention in 1818. He served as a state representative representing Madison County in the 2nd Illinois General Assembly and as a state representative representing Macoupin County in the 8th Illinois General Assembly. He later served as a state senator representing Macoupin County in the 10th Illinois General Assembly and 11th Illinois General Assembly.
