= Larkin Craig =

American politician

Member of the Illinois Senate
- In office 1832–1838

Larkin Craig was an American politician who served as a member of the Illinois Senate. He served as a state senator representing Bond, Macoupin, and Montgomery counties in the 8th and 9th Illinois General Assembly; and Bond and Montgomery counties in the 10th Illinois General Assembly.
