= James Turney =

American politician

Member of the Illinois Senate
- In office 1836–1839
- Succeeded by: Manoah Bostwick

Member of the Illinois House of Representatives
- In office 1834–1836

Attorney General of Illinois
- In office 1823–1828
- Preceded by: Samuel D. Lockwood
- Succeeded by: George Forquer

Member of the Illinois House of Representatives
- In office 1822–1823
- Preceded by: Charles Slade

Personal details
- Party: Democratic

James Turney was an American politician who served as the Attorney General of Illinois and as a member of both the Illinois House of Representatives and the Illinois State Senate.

== Biography ==
In 1819, Turney moved to Illinois from Tennessee settling in Washington County where he practiced law. From 1820 to 1822, he served as the secretary of the Illinois Senate in the 2nd Illinois General Assembly. In 1822, he won election to the Illinois House of Representatives representing Washington County in the 3rd Illinois General Assembly. He resigned on February 18, 1823 to serve as the Attorney General of Illinois, a position he held until 1828. In 1828, he moved to the town of Carrollton in Greene County. In 1831, he participated in the Black Hawk War as a private in the 2nd Regiment of Mounted Volunteers eventually being promoted to colonel in 1832 and later as paymaster general on the staff of Governor John Reynolds. In 1834, he won election again to the Illinois House representing Greene County in the 9th Illinois General Assembly. In 1836, he won election to a four-year term as state senator representing Greene County in the 10th and 11th Illinois General Assemblies. He resigned in the 11h Assembly before the start of the second session in 1839 and was replaced by Manoah Bostwick.
