= Susan Richardson (Underground Railroad) =

Escaped slave, church co-founder (1810-1904)

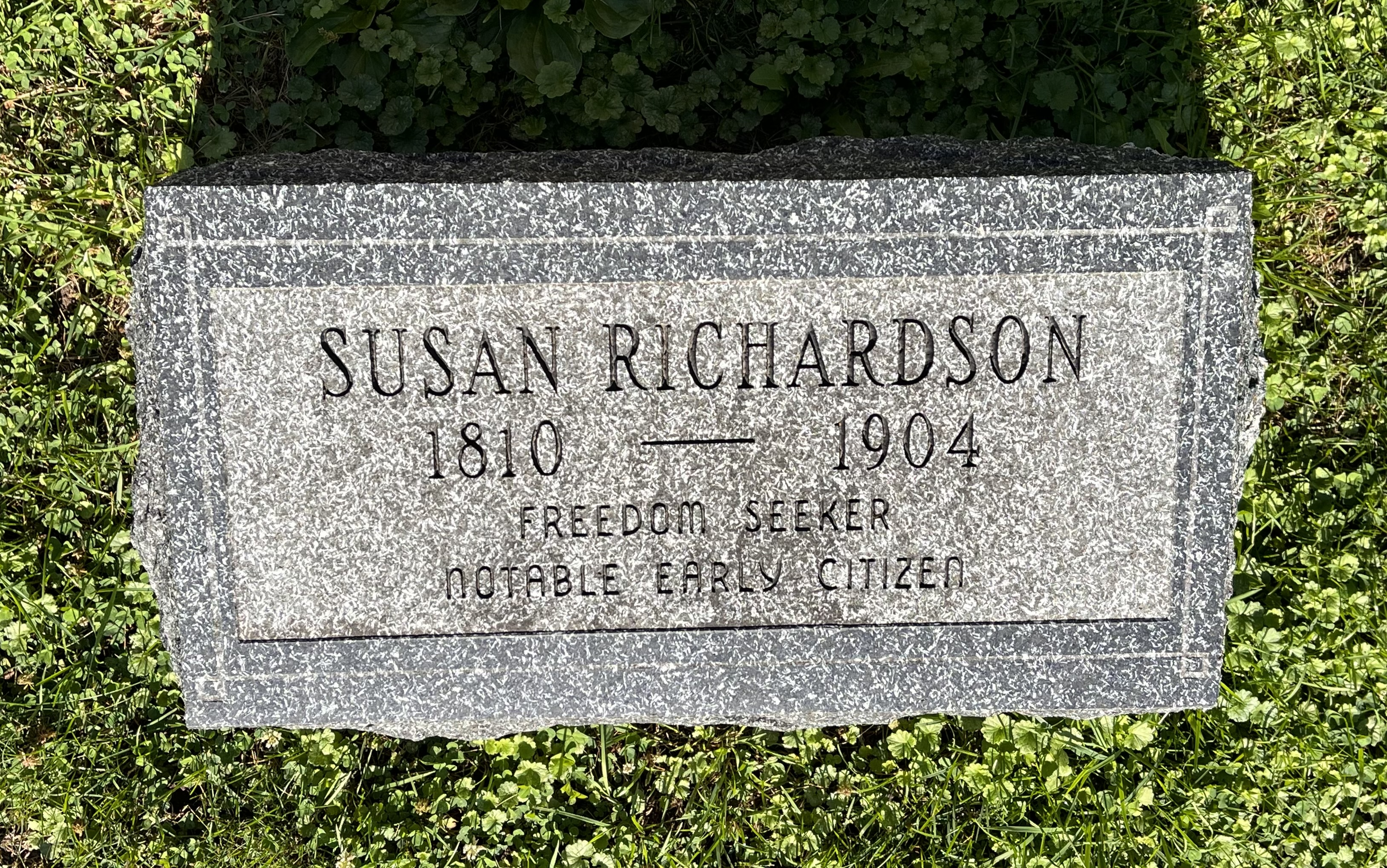
- Susan Richardson's gravestone in Hope Cemetery, Galesburg
- Born: June 6, 1810; Virginia
- Died: June 16, 1904 (aged 94); Chicago
- Resting place: Hope Cemetery, Galesburg, Illinois; 40°56′43.63″N 90°22′33.82″W
- Other names: Aunt Susan; Sukey (during slavery); Susan Van Allen (while married to Harry Van Allen); Susan Neil (before marriage)
- Known for: Escaping enslavement in Illinois via the Underground Railroad, helping to found Allen Church AME in Galesburg
- Relatives: Susan E. Cannon Allen (great-granddaughter)

Susan Richardson (June 6, 1810 – June 16, 1904), also known as Aunt Susan and Susan Van Allen, was an enslaved person who escaped and later helped to found Allen Chapel AME in Galesburg, a town that was a known safe haven on the Underground Railroad. Her escape prompted the 1844 Illinois Supreme Court case Borders v. Hayes. Richardson helped escaped slaves on the underground railroad while she lived in Galesburg.

== Early life ==
Susan “Sukey” Richardson, was born Susan Neil on June 6, 1810, in Virginia. She was enslaved by Andrew Borders after he received her from a dowry from his marriage to Martha Borders. The Borders’ moved from Georgia to Randolph County, Illinois on January 1, 1816, almost moving their four slaves, including Richardson. Illinois required all indentured servants to be registered, although it was considered a “free” territory. On January 10, 1817, at the age of five, Susan was officially indentured to Borders.

At the time of her escape, Richardson was about 31 years old and brought her three sons with her: Jarrot, about 12 years old, Anderson, almost 4, and Harrison, about 2. Another source claimed that her oldest child was 17 years old. Given descriptions of Jarrot, it is likely that Borders fathered Jarrot, most likely without Richardson's consent. It is reported that Borders threatening her sons prompted Richardson to run away along with 19/20 year-old Hannah, daughter of Sarah Morrison, a previous runaway slave of Borders.

=== Friends of Rational Liberty v. Borders ===
Friends of Rational Liberty v. Borders was a court case largely over the legality of slavery in Illinois, and took place in April 1842. The court case originated after Andrew Borders badly wounded Sarah Morrison's arm, an indentured servant he had acquired in 1825. The next night, Morrison escaped and went to the neighboring house of Matthew Chambers, and then later fled as to not be found by the Borders. Morrison had left behind her daughter Hannah in the care of Richardson. Borders sued Chambers for harboring Morrison, and a case was heard in April 1843. Borders won, but the case was appealed to the Illinois Supreme Court, where in December 1843 the decision was reversed. Borders blamed the neighborhood for stealing and secreting his property. Some of these people came together to form an assembly called the “Friends of Rational Liberty,” which entered suit in Morrison's name to try the Borders for assault, resulting in the 1843 case Sarah v. Borders, or Borders v. Borders. Counsels on both sides agreed that to try the general question regarding whether slavery could constitutionally exist in Illinois. A large issue they took into consideration was the Ordinance of 1787 because Morrison was indentured before Illinois was officially a state. Andrew Borders won the case, arguing that slavery had always been permitted in the territory. After the Friends of Rational Liberty lost, they appealed the case to the Illinois Supreme Court to challenge the legality of holding slaves in Illinois. The Illinois Supreme Court affirmed the original judgment, stating that the court lacked the ability to make political decisions, and that the people should make the decisions on whether persons of color's rights should be fixed based on the state's constitution, though all of Border's slaves, including Richardson, had escaped before the verdict was officially handed down.

== Richardson’s escape to freedom ==
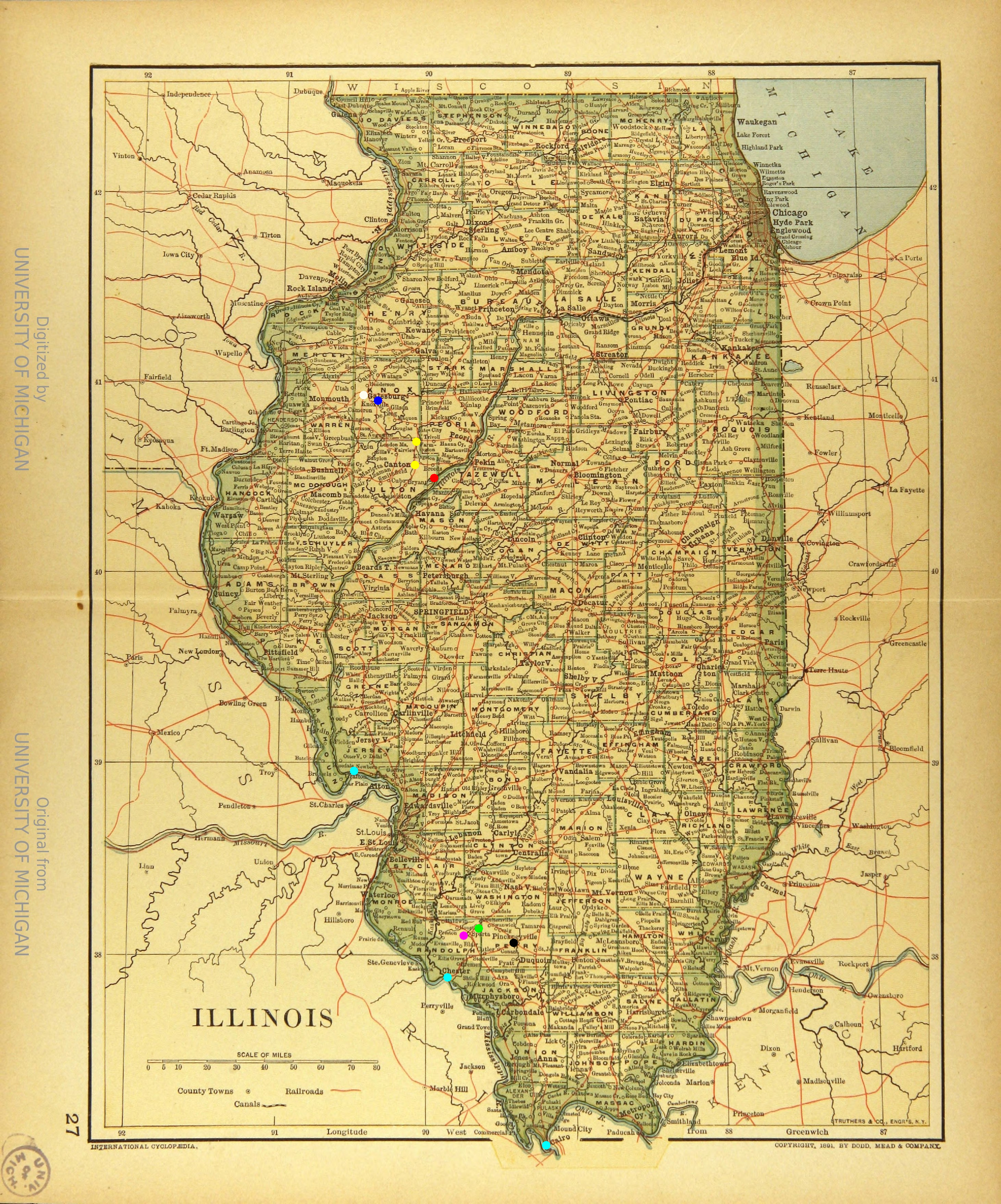
Richardson's Escape Route; Pink: Borders’ Farm, West of Sparta; Green: Hayes’ Farm, North of Eden; Light Blue: The possible sites where Richardson’s group got on a steamship so that they could escape via the Mississippi and Illinois rivers: Cairo, Chester Landing, or Grafton; Red: Copperas Creek, where Richardson’s group left the steamship; Yellow: Canton and Farmington, where Richardson’s group were by Sep. 5th; Blue: Knoxville, where Richardson’s group was held in jail, then worked; Black: Pinckneyville, the site of Borders v Hayes; White: Galesburg, where Richardson lived after escaping

Richardson escaped slave owner Andrew Borders on September 15, 1842, with her three children, accompanied by Hannah Morrison, another indentured servant to the Borders family. However, the exact timeline of Richardson and her children's runaway is unknown. Carol Pirtle's book titled Escape Betwixt Two Suns indicated that it was Wednesday, August 31, 1842, when the enslaved people escaped Borders. They apparently got on the Underground Railroad at Cairo to go to Canton and then reached Farmington, the extreme northeast corner of Fulton County, safely on September 5. On this journey, the enslaved people apparently arrived at William Hayes’ farm outside of Eden. Hayes allegedly helped Richardson and the children on their journey to Knoxville as their final destination. Testimonies from several residents living in Knoxville advocated for Hayes’ involvement in the escape. One claimed that Hayes had accompanied Richardson on a boat "up to the mouth of Coperras Creek" while another said part of the fugitives’ journey was in Hayes’ wagon. A citizen even claimed that Hayes had obtained certificates proving the slaves were free. Other witnesses argued against his participation in general. Hayes himself said he never aided the escape of the slaves in question.

While in Knoxville, Richardson, her sons, and Hannah Morrison were arrested and all placed in the Knox County Jail for 6 weeks, until one day they were put up for auction, supposedly to pay off their jail fees. While many people arrived for the spectacle, only a single bid was placed of fifty cents for Hannah.

After the auction, Richardson and her children were released from police custody. As runaways, Richardson rented a home in Knoxville and became a housekeeper, the same position she had with Borders. Her two young boys assisted with her cleaning job while Jarrot, the oldest, worked at a nearby farm.

Late November, early December 1843, Borders arrived in Knox County with indentured papers for Richardson and her children. After showing these documents to Sheriff Peter Frans, Borders and the sheriff went to retrieve the boys from their hotel. According to the History of Knox County, Borders met the younger children in the hallway of the hotel they were hiding at. Unfortunately, the oldest son was also unable to escape. Borders claimed that he could not get to Richardson because she “either ran away or was taken away.” After capturing the boys, they were imprisoned at the Knox County Jail and Borders was able to retrieve the boys after paying the jail fee. It's said that Borders thought that if he captured the children, Richardson would follow after: "If I can get the children I am not afraid but what the old one will follow." Grief-stricken, Richardson wanted to go after her children, but her friends persuaded her to escape. It is speculated that Charles Gilbert arrived at Rev. Cole (the Presbyterian minister of the town)’s residence to take Richardson, dressed in Mrs. Cole’s attire, to Galesburg. After these events took place members of the community came together and filed suit against Borders as they believed that his actions were unjust and that his indentured servant papers may have been fraudulent.

=== Members of the Indentured Servant Committee v. Borders and Richardson v. Borders ===
Members of the Indentured Servant Committee came together and filed suit as they believed that the indentures were either fraudulent, or at least defective. They also brought up another suit against Borders in Richardson’s name for false imprisonment of her boys. Borders was asked to provide the indentures for the boys and that he wouldn’t be bothered until the next secession of the circuit court. Borders refused to show the papers to validate the legitimacy of his claims, and instead left town. A warrant was provided for his arrest, and the arrest of his son, and they were imprisoned, found guilty of false imprisonment, and fined five hundred dollars. Borders finally provided the indentures to prove he owned the children, but the committee found them faulty as Jarrot’s age was cut out of the paper. Borders and his son were found guilty and fined four hundred dollars, which they refused to pay. For this refusal to pay, they were sent to the same jail that Richardson’s children were imprisoned in. This prison was described as cold due to it being open to the elements and “‘too uncomfortable a place to spend the night,’” though it was apparently adequate for the Richardson's children who had been imprisoned there. Sheriff Fran provided Borders and his son accommodations to make their imprisonment more comfortable. Borders and his son did not stay long as an unknown person supplied their bail. The children, though, had disappeared, and where they went remains somewhat of a mystery. It is speculated that Borders and the Sheriff were responsible for their disappearance, and that the boys were taken south and sold. In 1844, it was reported that Jarrot died in a mill accident.

== Borders v. Hayes court cases ==
On February 8, 1843, Borders sued Hayes for $2,500 in damages for aiding the escape of Susan Borders, Hannah Morrison, and Susan's three children, Jarrot, Anderson, and Harrison. Originally, the case was going to take place in Randolph County, but, on April 28, it was moved to Pinckneyville, Perry County, Illinois because the defendant, Hayes, felt that the residents of Randolph county were prejudiced against him for his involvement in the Underground Railroad. The trial began on April 18, 1844. During this case James Shield was the judge appointed by the supreme court justices. William Bissel and Gustave Koerner were the attorneys for Andrew Borders and William H Underwood and Lyman Trumbull were the attorneys for Hayes.

Borders tried to argue that Susan Richardson and her kids were rightfully his property and that William Hayes had broken the law by aiding and helping them to escape from the border's house. There were seven counts that were mentioned against Hayes in the Perry court case:

1. Aiding the escape of the plaintiff's servants from Sep 15 to Dec 1, 1842, and related costs
2. Aiding the escape of Sukey (Susan Richardson), one of the plaintiff's servants, and related costs
3. Aiding the escape of another of the plaintiff's servants, and related costs
4. Enticing away three of the plaintiff's apprentices, and related costs
5. Enticing away Jarrot
6. Enticing away Anderson
7. Enticing away Harrison.

Hayes protested the legality of the case. He lost, and Borders was awarded $300 by the court, which covered the costs of finding and retaking Hannah, Richardson, and her children. Hayes then asked the court to grant a retrial because:

1. The verdict was contrary to law
2. The verdict was contrary to evidence
3. Improper evidence was permitted to go to the jury
4. The court misdirected the jury

The court refused, so Hayes appealed the case to the Illinois Supreme Court. His attorneys argued that some of the counts in the case had been misjoined and that the process by which Richardson's children had been bound out into Borders’ ownership was performed in error and therefore void. They also argued that the registry of slaves from the Randolph county clerk was not properly certified and was filled out by an incorrect authority, that improper instructions were given to the jury which unjustly favored Borders, and that the court's refusal to grant a retrial was in error. Borders’ attorneys argued that the misjoinder did not occur, there was no defect in the registry, it was properly certified by the correct court authority, the court did not err in providing alternate instructions, and that the refusal to grant a retrial was not an error. The supreme court sided with Borders throughout the appeal and upheld the Perry Circuit Court's judgment. Justice Thomas wrote the opinion of the court, and Justice Lockwood dissented.

== Freedom and later life ==
After coming to Galesburg, Richardson moved into a house at the northeast corner of West street and Ferris street. She adopted the names, “Aunt Susan,” “Aunt Sukey (Suky),” and “Mrs. Richardson” after living in Galesburg. In 1846, she married Harry Van Allen. They had three children together, named Evelene, Mary, and Owen. Then, in about 1857, Susan married Thomas Richardson, who had come with eight children from Kentucky via the Underground Railroad. Susan Richardson became a ‘conductor’ on the Underground Railroad in Galesburg who helped Bill Casey, among others, escape to freedom.

=== Allen Chapel AME ===
In 1851, Richardson began to host prayer meetings at her house for the growing black community of the town. In 1853, their gatherings coalesced into a church led by Rev. J. W. Early. In 1855, Richardson learned of an A. M. E. meeting in Chicago. She sold her only hog and its litter to fund her travel there. In 1858, Rev. Woodfork came from the conference to Galesburg to help the church move from Richardson's house to a permanent location, and, by 1860, A. M. E. Allen Church was constructed at 153 E. Tompkins Street. Richardson's husband, Thomas Richardson, was one of the founding trustees of the new church.

Richardson died of old age on the afternoon of June 16, 1904 in the Chicago home of her daughter, Mary Fleming, and was buried in Hope cemetery in Galesburg. One of her great-granddaughters was Susan E. Cannon Allen, an African-American suffragist and temperance activist.
