= David Porter (Illinois politician) =

American politician

Member of the Illinois House of Representatives
- In office 1818–1820

Member of the Illinois House of Representatives
- In office 1834–1836

David Porter was an American politician who served as a member of the Illinois House of Representatives. He served as a state representative representing Crawford County in the 1st Illinois General Assembly and the 9th Illinois General Assembly.
