= Manoah Bostwick =

American politician

Member of the Illinois Senate
- In office 1839–1840
- Preceded by: James Turney

Manoah Bostwick was an American politician who served as a member of the Illinois Senate. He was elected in a special election held on November 25, 1839 to serve the remainder of James Turney's term representing Greene county in the 11th Illinois General Assembly after Turney's resignation from the Illinois Senate.
