= William Davidson (Illinois politician) =

American politician

Member of the Illinois House of Representatives
- In office 1836–1838

William Davidson was an American politician who served as a member of the Illinois House of Representatives. He served as a state representative representing Marion County in the 10th Illinois General Assembly.
