= James Shields =

James Shields may refer to:

- James Shields (Ohio politician) (1762–1831), U.S. representative from Ohio
- James Shields (politician, born 1806) (1806–1879), U.S. Army general and senator from Illinois, Minnesota, and Missouri
  - Statue of James Shields (U.S. Capitol), an 1893 bronze sculpture of James Shields by Leonard Volk
- Shaemas O'Sheel (James Shields, 1886–1954), Irish-American poet
- James Shields (psychiatric geneticist) (1918–1978), Scottish psychiatric geneticist
- James Shields (sprinter), winner of the 1967 4 × 440 yard relay at the NCAA Division I Indoor Track and Field Championships
- James Shields (baseball) (born 1981), American baseball player

== See also ==
- Jimmy Shields (disambiguation)
