= Peoria County Courthouse =

Local government building in the United States

Coordinates: 40.6930°N 89.5897°W

The Peoria County Courthouse, located at 324 Main Street in Peoria, is the county courthouse serving Peoria County, Illinois. Built in 1964, it is a building of Modern Architecture.

== Description ==
The Peoria County Courthouse is the working center of the elected county board, the office of the Peoria County Administrator, and the center of the 26 (as of 2025) departments of the Peoria County government. The courthouse wraps around the historic Courthouse Square on Peoria's Adams Street.

Predecessor buildings were built in 1829, 1833, and 1873. The third Courthouse was in use from 1873 until 1964. It was then razed, but the historic courthouse clock was salvaged for eventual display at the Peoria Riverfront Museum.
