= Peoria Riverfront Museum =

Museum in Peoria, Illinois, US

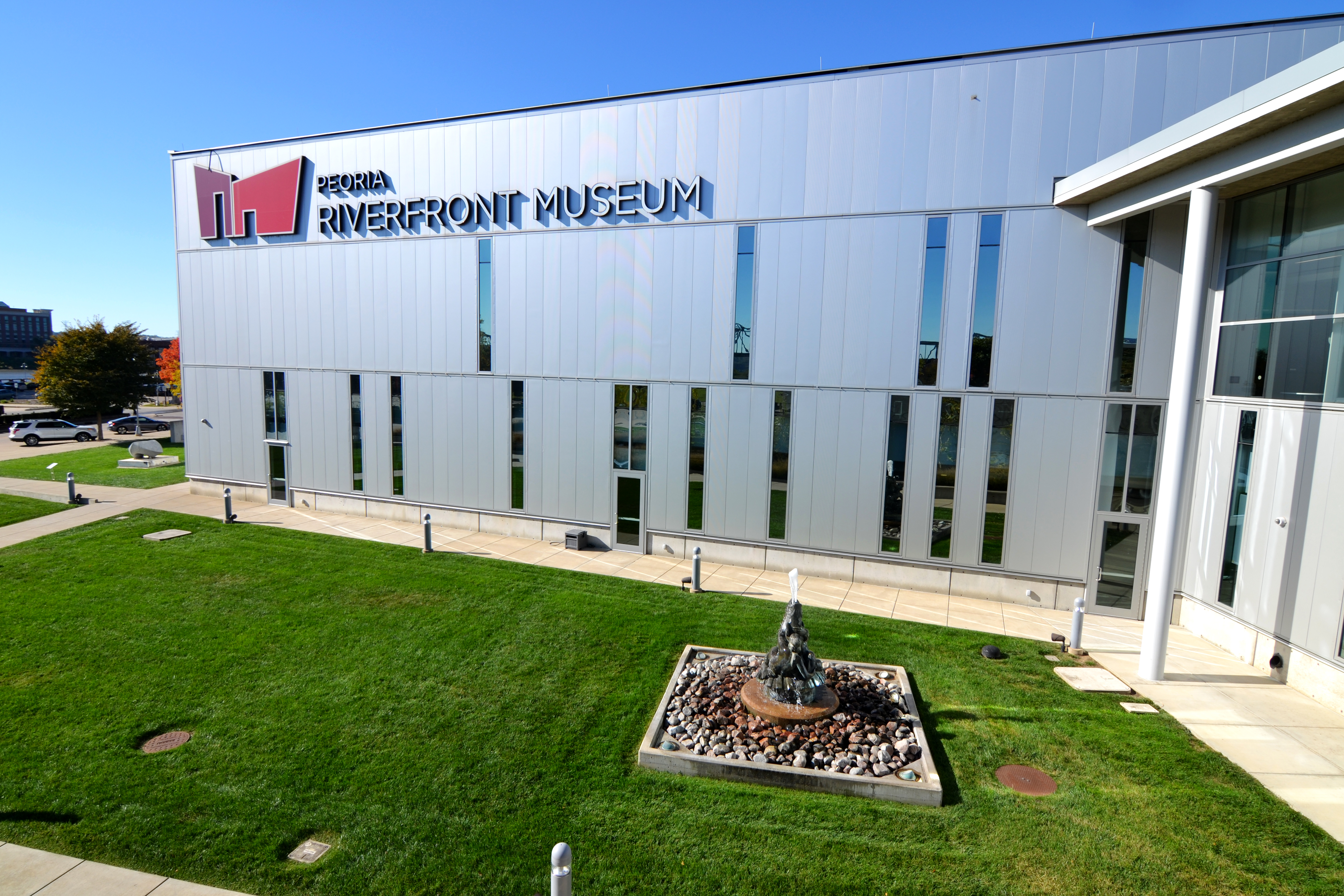
- Established: October 20, 2012
- Location: 222 SW Washington Street; Peoria, Illinois
- Coordinates: 40.6894°N 89.5899°W
- Type: Art, science, history, achievement, planetarium, film society
- President: John D. Morris
- Architect: ZGF (Zimmer Gunsul Frasca) Dewberry
- Public transit access: CityLink
- Website: www.peoriariverfrontmuseum.org

The Peoria Riverfront Museum is a non-profit multidisciplinary museum of art, science, history, and achievement that promotes itself as the only museum of its kind in the United States. It is located on the Illinois river in downtown Peoria, Illinois. Representing a unique private/public partnership, the museum is privately funded by donors and members while operating in a building owned by the County of Peoria. The museum has five major galleries and more than 30 other smaller display spaces for constantly rotating exhibitions ranging from international blockbusters to displays from its permanent collection. It is also known for its 40 ft (12 m) Digistar 7 dome planetarium and a film society using a 70 ft (21 m) Giant Screen Theater, the largest known film society screen in the U.S.

Exhibition partners include philanthropist Alice Walton's Art Bridges Foundation, the Smithsonian, with a strategic partnership with many leading cultural organizations in New York including the American Museum of Natural History, and the Whitney Museum of American Art the American Folk Art Museum, MoMA, and others. Permanent displays include the Center for American Decoys, "Bronzeville to Harlem: An American Story", the Duryea Experience, and other items in the museum's 18,000-object collection, which is constantly being rotated for guests. The museum opened its 87,000 sq ft (8,100 m^{2}) building on October 20, 2012, as the successor to Peoria's Lakeview Museum of Arts & Sciences, established in 1965.

== Description ==
The museum's collections include fine art (paintings, sculptures, works on paper), decorative art (furniture, ceramics, metal, glass, textiles), folk art (paintings, sculptures, graphics, decorative arts, etc.), ethnographic art (Native American, African, Oceanic, Asian), natural science artifacts (rocks and minerals, insects, shells), and historic artifacts including a Duryea Motor Wagon Company car, theater and opera posters, and square dancing items. The museum also owns a significant collection of folk art wildfowl decoy carvings.

The world's third largest scale model of the Solar System is centered on the museum, which has a 46 feet (14 m) diameter representation of the Sun. A 5 inches (13 cm) model of the Earth is 0.94 miles (1.51 km) away and Neptune is 28 miles away. The full model includes 5 dwarf planets and a number of comets around the globe. An 1873 civic clock, originally built for the third Peoria County Courthouse, keeps time for the Museum.

The museum building is adjacent to the historic Rock Island Depot and Freight House.

== Development ==
The LEED-Gold certified building was completed by architect Dewberry and Williams Brothers Construction. The Peoria Riverfront Museum opened on October 20, 2012 as a successor to the Lakeview Museum of Arts and Sciences, which had been founded by private citizens in 1965 as the Lakeview Center and whose building was then given to and maintained by the Peoria Park District while its operations remained entirely private. Lakeview Museum was located in the north central suburban Lakeview Park in Peoria. It was also home to more than 50 member clubs, hobby groups, and organizations who formed an independent arts and sciences council whose members had helped start the museum.

Lakeview Museum officials led the campaign for the new museum, and its collections, trustees and staff formed the foundation of the Peoria Riverfront Museum operation when it opened. The Peoria Riverfront Museum was funded by private contributions with support from donated land by the city of Peoria and support for the building by a tax referendum approved by voters of Peoria County. The operations are supported by donations and earned revenue while the building and grounds are owned by Peoria County and leased to the museum by public-private partnership agreement. Key to the agreement was the enactment by local voters of a supplemental sales tax. An admission fee is charged to museum nonmembers. The museum has averaged about 150,000 visitor experiences annually since its opening, and since the pandemic shutdown in 2020, grown substantially in its social media and digital engagements, reaching 3 million annual digital engagements in 2025.
