= Lakeview Museum of Arts and Sciences =

Coordinates: 40°44′30″N 89°36′39″W

- Established: March 28, 1965
- Dissolved: September 2012; 13 years ago
- Location: 1125 W. Lake Ave. Peoria, IL 61614-5985
- Type: Public museum
- Visitors: 125,000

The Lakeview Museum of Arts and Sciences was a public museum of science and culture located in Peoria, Illinois that operated from 1965 to 2012. Its assets have been transferred to the Peoria Riverfront Museum.

== History ==
In 1954, 26 art and science groups from the Arts and Science Council helped to create a facility for exhibitions and educational programs. In 1961, the initial campaign raised $1 million for construction on Lake Avenue. The Council raised money through subscriptions, pledges, advance gifts, and a benefit ball at the Pere Marquette hotel. The museum was originally named Lakeview Center, after a Lakeview recreation camp that operated in East Peoria from 1923–1954.

Phase 1 contained a planetarium that broke ground on April 10, 1962 and opened on June 9, 1963. The 36-foot planetarium was set as the sun in the largest to scale mock solar system as recognized the Guinness Book of Records in 1992. The museum broke ground on July 19, 1963 and the galleries opened on March 28, 1965. A time capsule was sealed in the floor during the dedication on March 27, 1965. In 1978, the name was changed to Lakeview Museum of Arts and Sciences. An additional $1 million was raised for facility upgrades.

== Closing ==
The museum closed in September 2012, having been replaced in its functions. Its replacement, the Peoria Riverfront Museum, of which Lakeview Museum's organizations were participants, opened in October 2012 in downtown Peoria.
