= George W. Harrison (Illinois politician) =

American politician

Member of the Illinois State Senate
- In office 1838–1846

Personal details
- Born: April 23, 1803 Virginia
- Party: Whig

George W. Harrison (April 23, 1803 - fl. 1849) was an American politician who served as a member of the Illinois State Senate.

In the 1830s, Harrison worked as a surveyor in Michigan Territory, which is now Wisconsin.

In 1836, Harrison, along with John Vliet, was contracted to survey Fort Madison, Burlington, Belleview, Dubuque, Peru, and Mineral Point.

In January 1838, Harrison was elected vice president of the Galena Temperance Society. Later that year, he ran for the Illinois State Senate for the first time and won the election as a Whig. He was re-elected in 1840, 1842, and 1844.

In 1849, he traveled to California as part of the Gold Rush and arrived in San Francisco. His whereabouts thereafter are unknown.
