= James Shields (psychiatric geneticist) =

Scottish psychiatric geneticist

- Born: 21 November 1918; Edinburgh, Scotland
- Died: 20 June 1978 (aged 59); London, England
- Education: Merton College, Oxford; London School of Economics
- Known for: Schizophrenia research Twin studies
- Spouse: Elizabeth Shields
- Children: Julia (now Julia Donaldson, children's writer) and Mary (now Mary Moore)
- Scientific career
- Fields: Psychiatric genetics
- Workplaces: Maudsley Hospital

James Shields (21 November 1918 – 20 June 1978) was a Scottish psychiatric geneticist and twin researcher. In the 1960s, he worked with Irving Gottesman on a twin study of schizophrenia at the Medical Research Council Psychiatric Genetics Unit at Maudsley Hospital in London, England. This study, known as the Maudsley twin study, is now considered a landmark in the field. He had previously begun working for Eliot Slater at Maudsley after serving in the United Kingdom's Royal Artillery during World War II. He was a fellow of the Eugenics Society and the International Society for Twin Studies. After Shields died in 1978, Gottesman founded the annual James Shields Award for Lifetime Contributions to Twin Research in his honor.
