= John Hamlin =

American politician

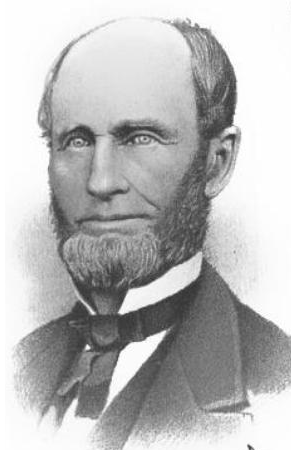

John Hamlin (October 25, 1800 – March 29, 1876) was an American politician. His travels early in his adulthood led him to Peoria, Illinois, where he traded for the American Fur Company. He served one term in the Illinois House of Representatives and then two terms in the Illinois Senate.

== Biography ==
John Hamlin was born on October 25, 1800, in Hampden County, Massachusetts, to John and Lucy Hamlin. He worked on a farm when he was a child and attended some schooling. When he was sixteen, he joined his brother's business, selling goods from a traveling wagon. Three years later, the brothers had sold all of their wares and sold the wagon. Hamlin moved frequently in the subsequent years, staying at times in Massachusetts, New York, Ohio, Kentucky, and Indiana. He set out for another sojourn to Missouri, but on his way, he decided to stay at Logan County, Illinois (then Sangamon County). Settling near James Latham's farm in Elkhart, Hamlin worked Latham's land for a year. In 1821, Hamlin joined a keelboat operation on the Sangamon River, selling goods to settlements on the river. That May, Hamlin decided to build a pair of log cabins in Peoria and permanently settle.

When Fulton County was formed in 1822, Hamlin was elected its first justice of the peace. He took a contract the next year to supply Fort Howard in Wisconsin with beef. He became associated with the American Fur Company after a visit to Fort Dearborn. He used his house in Fort Clark as a trading post, often trading with Native Americans. He opened a store in Peoria in 1825 and established a branch in Mackinawtown in 1828. A year after Peoria County was founded in 1825, Hamlin was elected county commissioner. He served a two-year term and was later elected to another two-year term in 1830, although he resigned before it was completed. Hamlin donated a log cabin to serve as the first Peoria County Courthouse in March 1829. Four years later, he was commissioned to provide rock and timber for the first permanent courthouse.

In 1829, Hamlin sold his other business interests to co-founded the first flour mill in the area with John Sharp, which ran for five years. He bought a steamboat, the S. B. Triton which he renamed the Peoria, and operated it between Peoria and St. Louis, Missouri, the first such boat on the Illinois River. In Peoria, Hamlin served on the board of trustees and as an alderman. In 1834, he was elected as a Whig to the Illinois House of Representatives. After a two-year term, he was elected to the Illinois Senate, where he was re-elected two years later. Later in his life he joined the Second National Bank of Peoria as a director. He co-founded the Savings Bank of Peoria with seven other investors in 1868. He died on March 29, 1876, and was buried in Springdale Cemetery.
