= Samuel Hackleton =

American politician (1804-1848)

Samuel Hackleton (December 22, 1804 – July 6, 1848) was a farmer, trader, soldier, and politician.

Born in Marblehead, Massachusetts, Hackletom moved to Jay, Maine in 1828. In 1830, he settled in Fulton County, Illinois. Hackleton returned to Marblehead, Massachusetts briefly and then returned to Fulton County, Illinois. He was a farmer and trader. Hackleton served in the Illinois House of Representatives in 1832, 1834, and 1842; he served as Speaker of the Illinois House of Refresentatives in 1842. From 1836 to 1840, Hackleton served in the Illinois State Senate. He fought in the Black Hawk War. In 1847, he fought in the Mexican–American War and killed near what is now Santa Fe, New Mexico.
