= Newton Cloud =

American politician

Newton Cloud (November 29, 1804 – July 22, 1877) was an American politician and Methodist minister.

Cloud was born in Stokes County, North Carolina. He moved to Kentucky with his parents. In 1828, he moved to Morgan County, Illinois and settled in Waverly, Illinois. Cloud served as a Methodist minister and was a farmer. He served in the Illinois House of Representatives from 1830 to 1832, from 1834 to 1836, from 1836 to 1840, from 1842 to 1844, from 1846 to 1848, and from 1871 to 1873. He served as speaker of the house from 1846 to 1848. Cloud served as chief clerk of the Illinois House of Representatives from 1844 to 1846. Cloud also served in the Illinois Constitutional Convention of 1847 and was the president of the convention. Cloud served in the Illinois Senate from 1849 to 1852. Cloud was a Democrat. He died at his home in Waverly, Illinois.
